= List of oceanographers =

This list of oceanographers is presented in English alphabetical transliteration order (by surnames).

== A ==
- Carin Ashjian (US, born 1960)
- James Percy Ault (US, 1881–1929)
- Alice Alldredge (US, born 1949)
- Lihini Aluwihare
- Henryk Arctowski (Poland, 1871–1958)
- Giuseppina Aliverti (Italy, 1894–1982)
- Mark R. Abbott (US)
- Shahid Ashraf (Pakistani, born 1947)
- E. Virginia Armbrust (US)
- Susan Avery (US, born 1950)
- Susana Agustí (Spain)

== B ==
- Wladimir Besnard (France, 1890–1960)
- Anton Frederik Bruun (1901–1961)
- Karin Bryan (New Zealand)
- Karl Banse (US, 1929–2025)
- Henry Bryant Bigelow (US, 1879–1967)
- Thomas A. Budd (US, 1818–1862)
- Robert Beardsley (US, born 1942)
- María Teresa López Boegeholz (Chile, 1927–2006)
- John Russell Bartlett (US, 1843–1904)
- Paula Bontempi (US)
- Robert Ballard (US, born 1942)
- Nils Bang (South Africa, 1941–1977)
- Deborah Bronk (US)
- Wolfgang H. Berger (US/Germany, 1937–2017)
- Ken Buesseler (US, born 1959)
- Kirk Bryan (US, born 1929)
- Charles-François Beautemps-Beaupré (France, 1766–1854)
- Claudia Benitez-Nelson (US)
- Brian B. Brown (US, born 1964)
- Helen Bostock (Australia, born 1977)
- Richard E. Byrd (US, 1888–1957)
- Jacques Bourcart (France, 1891–1965)
- Willard Bascom (US, 1916–2000)
- Katherine Barbeau
- S. Suresh Babu (India, born 1976)
- Silas Bent (US, 1820–1887)
- Alexander Buchan (Scotland, 1829–1907)
- Ramón Bravo (1925–1998)
- Amy Bower (US)
- Lisa Beal (US)
- Wallace Smith Broecker (US, 1931–2019)
- Matilene Berryman (US, 1920–2003)
- Harry Bryden (US, born 1946)
- Heinrich Georg von Boguslawski (Germany, 1827–1884)
- Thomas S. Bianchi (US, born 1956)
- William Speirs Bruce (Scotland, 1867–1921)
- Leonid Brekhovskikh (Russia/Soviet Union, 1917–2005)

== C ==
- Maria Bianca Cita (Italy, 1924–2024)
- Craig A. Carlson (US, born 1963)
- Katherine Richardson Christensen (born 1954)
- James Churgin (US, born 1928)
- Josefina Castellví (Spain, born 1935)
- Eddy Carmack (Canada, born 1943)
- Leticia Carvalho (Brazil, born 1973)
- Elizabeth Canuel
- Anela Choy (US)
- Rafael Antonio Curra
- Kathleen Crane (US, born 1951)
- Mike Coffin (US, born 1955)
- Roger Charlier (1921–2018)
- Zanna Chase (Australia)
- Sallie W. Chisholm (US, born 1947)
- Anita Conti (France, 1899–1997)
- Fabien Cousteau (France, born 1967)
- Ronald Ian Currie (Scotland, 1928–1996)
- Anny Cazenave (France, born 1944)
- Maureen Conte
- Charles Shipley Cox (US, 1922–2015)
- Jacques Cousteau (France, 1910–1997)
- Robert Corell (US, born 1934)
- Townsend Cromwell (US, 1922–1958)
- Rosalind Coggon
- William Curry (US)
- David Edgar Cartwright (Britain, 1926–2015)
- Philippe Cousteau (France, 1940–1979)
- David Cromwell (Scotland, born 1962)
- Claudia Cenedese (born 1971)
- Jeff Chanton (US)
- John A. Church (Australia, born 1951)

== D ==
- Ellen R.M. Druffel (US, born 1953)
- Sonya Dyhrman (US, born 1972)
- Shankar Doraiswamy (India, born 1964)
- Robert S. Dietz (US, 1914–1995)
- Tom Denniss (Australia, born 1961)
- Bernard Delemotte (France)
- Paul K. Dayton (US, born 1941)
- Philippe Diolé (France, 1908–1977)
- Albert Defant (Austria, 1884–1974)
- Louis Dangeard (France, 1898–1987)
- Arthur Thomas Doodson (Britain, 1890–1968)
- Günter Dietrich (Germany, 1911–1972)
- Karen Von Damm (US, 1955–2008)
- Margaret Delaney
- Scott Doney (US)
- Jody Deming (US, born 1952)
- Henry Newton Dickson (Scotland, 1866–1922)

== E ==
- John Englander (US)
- Curtis Ebbesmeyer (US, born 1943)
- Vagn Walfrid Ekman (Sweden, 1874–1954)
- Kenneth O. Emery (US, 1914–1998)
- Matthew England (Australia, born 1966)
- John M. Edmond (Scotland, 1943–2001)
- Marta Estrada (Spain, born 1946)
- Ernst Ehrenbaum (Germany, 1861–1942)
- Jean-Louis Étienne (France, born 1946)
- Arthur Earland (Britain, 1866–1958)
- Sylvia Earle (US, born 1935)

== F ==
- Kelly Falkner (US, born 1960)
- Philip Froelich (US)
- Richard Feely (US)
- Allison Fong (US)
- Evan Forde (US, born 1952)
- Michael Fasham (Britain, 1942–2008)
- Ernst Føyn (Norway, 1904–1984)
- Gene Carl Feldman (US)
- Louis Fortier (Canada, 1953–2020)
- Arne Foldvik (Norway, born 1930)
- Rana Fine (US, born 1944)
- Sarah Fawcett (South Africa)
- Lucyna Mirosława Falkowska (Poland, 1951–2021)
- Jonas Fjeldstad (Norway, 1894–1985)
- Marie Poland Fish (US, 1900–1989)
- Léopold de Folin (France, 1817–1896)
- Michael Freilich (US, 1954–2020)
- Michèle Marie Fieux (France, born 1940)

== G ==
- Yakov Gakkel (Russia, 1901–1965)
- Ken George (Britain, born 1947)
- David McNiven Garner (1928–2016)
- Kristina Gjerde
- Jean-Pierre Gattuso (France, born 1958)
- Timothy Gallaudet (US, born 1967)
- Janet Grieve
- Shari Gallop (New Zealand)
- Adrian Gill (Australia, 1937–1986)
- María de los Ángeles Alvariño González (Spain, 1916–2005)
- Kirstyn Goodger (New Zealand, born 1991)
- Alexander Gorodnitsky (Soviet Union, born 1933)
- Ann Gargett (Canada)
- Robert Gagosian (US, born 1944)
- Christopher German (US)
- Roman Glazman (US, 1948–2006)
- David Gruber (US)
- Hamed Gohar (1907–1992)
- Robert R. L. Guillard (US, 1921–2016)
- Christopher Garrett (Britain, born 1943)
- Sulochana Gadgil (India, born 1944)
- J. Frederick Grassle (US, 1939–2018)
- Sarah Gille
- Joaquim Goes (India)

== H ==
- Karen Heywood (Britain)
- Hava Hornung (1929–2012)
- Bjørn Helland-Hansen (Norway, 1877–1957)
- Bruce C. Heezen (US, 1924–1977)
- Tessa M. Hill (US)
- David Ho (US)
- Gotthilf Hempel (Germany, born 1929)
- Arlo Hemphill (US, born 1971)
- Nicholas H. Heck (US, 1882–1953)
- William Abbott Herdman (Scotland, 1858–1924)
- Timothy D. Herbert (US)
- Sara Harris (Canada, born 1969)
- Peter M. Haugan (Norway, born 1958)
- Julie Huber (US)
- Archibald Gowanlock Huntsman (Canada, 1883–1973)
- Kenneth Hsu (China, born 1929)
- Karl Helfrich (US)
- Klaus Hasselmann (Germany, born 1931)
- John Hunt (US, 1918–2005)
- Roberta Hamme (Canada)
- Barbara Hickey (Canada)
- Johan Hjort (Norway, 1869–1948)
- Hilairy Hartnett
- Ron Heath (New Zealand, born 1944)
- Susan Humphris (Britain)
- Eileen Hofmann

== I ==
- Anitra Ingalls (US)
- Shizuo Ishiguro (Japan, 1920–2007)
- Ian Irvine (Australia, born 1950)
- Douglas Inman (US, 1920–2016)
- Walter C. Pitman III (US, 1931–2019)
- John Dove Isaacs (US, 1913–1980)

== J ==
- Samantha Joye (US, born 1965)
- Nils Jerlov (Sweden, 1909–1990)
- Ashanti Johnson (US)
- Richard W. Johnson (US, 1929–2016)
- W. W. Behrens Jr. (US, 1922–1986)
- Catherine Jeandel (France, born 1957)
- Stacy Jupiter (US, born 1975)
- August von Jilek (Austria, 1819–1898)
- Martin W. Johnson (US, 1893–1984)
- James Johnstone (Scotland, 1870–1932)

== K ==
- Ellen S. Kappel (US)
- Charles David Keeling (US, 1928–2005)
- Otto Krümmel (Germany, 1854–1912)
- Björn Kjerfve (Sweden, born 1944)
- Alexander Kuchin (Russia, born 1888)
- Deborah Kelley (US, born 1958)
- Thor Kvinge (Norway, born 1929)
- Nikolai Knipovich (Soviet Union, 1862–1939)
- Miriam Kastner (US, born 1935)
- Emily Klein
- Elizabeth Kujawinski (US)
- Brenda Konar (US)
- Stanislav Kurilov (Canada/Russia, 1936–1998)
- John A. Knauss (US, 1925–2015)
- David Karl (US, born 1950)
- Jotaro Kujo (Japan, born 1971)

== L ==
- Sonya Legg
- Margaret Leinen (US, born 1946)
- Eugenie Lisitzin (1905–1989)
- Lisa Levin (US)
- Evelyn Lessard (US)
- Karin Lochte (Germany, born 1952)
- Mojib Latif (Germany/Pakistani, born 1954)
- Lucien Laubier (France, 1936–2008)
- Louis Legendre (Canada, born 1945)
- Alan Longhurst (Canada/Britain, 1925–2023)
- Susan Lozier (US)
- Cindy Lee (US)
- Jean Lynch-Stieglitz
- Kelsey Leonard
- William Li (Canada, born 1952)
- Johann Lutjeharms (South Africa, 1944–2011)
- Anthony Seymour Laughton (Britain, 1927–2019)
- Richard A. Lutz (US, born 1949)
- Rob Lewis (Australia)
- Bruce P. Luyendyk (US, born 1943)
- Cornelia Lüdecke (Germany, born 1954)

== M ==
- Catalina Martinez (US)
- Albert I, Prince of Monaco (1848–1922)
- John Martin (US, 1935–1993)
- K. Megan McArthur (US, born 1971)
- Nancy Marcus (US, 1950–2018)
- Kate Moran
- Timothy McGee (US, born 1955)
- Sheina Marshall (Britain, 1896–1977)
- Martin Mork (Norway, 1933–2017)
- Silvia Maciá (US, born 1972)
- George Murray (Scotland, 1858–1911)
- Tad Murty (Canada/India, born 1938)
- Alfred Merz (Austria, 1880–1925)
- José Hipólito Monteiro
- Anita McConnell (Britain, 1936–2016)
- Jennifer Mackinnon (US, born 1973)
- Håkon Mosby (Norway, 1903–1989)
- John Marshall (Britain)
- Harry A. Marmer (US, 1885–1953)
- Ian MacDonald (US)
- Roberta Marinelli (US)
- Carrie Manfrino (US)
- Fiona McLaughlin (Canada)
- Ron G. Mason (Britain, 1916–2009)
- Margaret Mulholland
- Benjamin Van Mooy (US)
- Ramon Margalef (Spain, 1919–2004)
- Jacqueline McGlade (Britain, born 1955)
- Henry Mitchell (US, 1830–1902)
- Charles J. Moore (US)
- Kenneth C. Macdonald (US, born 1947)
- Jean-Louis Michel (France, born 1945)
- John Murray (Scotland, 1841–1914)
- Henry William Menard (US, 1920–1986)
- David Marshall (Britain, born 1968)
- Walter Munk (US, 1917–2019)
- Wiesław Masłowski (US/Poland)
- David Mearns (US)
- Katrin Meissner (Australia/Germany)
- Jochem Marotzke (Germany, born 1959)
- Jessica Meeuwig (Australia)
- Homer A. McCrerey (US, 1919–1999)
- Matthew Fontaine Maury (US, 1806–1873)
- Susanne Menden-Deuer
- Lorenz Magaard (US/Germany, 1934–2020)
- Oleg Mamayev (Soviet Union, 1925–1994)
- Marcia McNutt (US, born 1952)
- Parker MacCready (US)
- James C. McWilliams (US)
- Cecilie Mauritzen (Norway, born 1961)
- Nils-Axel Mörner (Sweden, born 1938)
- Trevor McDougall (Australia, born 1952)
- Jack Moyer (US, 1929–2004)
- Larry Mayer (US)
- Luigi Ferdinando Marsili (Italy, 1658–1730)
- John E. McCosker (US)
- Peter B. de Menocal (US)

== N ==
- Shailesh Nayak (India, born 1953)
- Pearn P. Niiler (US, 1937–2010)
- Doron Nof (US, born 1944)
- Georg von Neumayer (Australia, 1826–1909)
- John Elliott Nafe (US, 1914–1996)

== O ==
- Delia Oppo (US)
- Mark Ohman (US)
- James O'Brien (US, 1935–2016)
- Andrew Picken Orr (Britain, 1875–1961)

== P ==
- Johann Siegmund Popowitsch (Austria, 1705–1774)
- N. Kesava Panikkar (India, 1913–1977)
- Carlos I of Portugal (1863–1908)
- Prem Chand Pandey (India, born 1945)
- Mary Jane Perry (US)
- Owen Martin Phillips (US, 1930–2010)
- Albert Eide Parr (US, 1900–1991)
- Trevor Platt (Canada/Britain, 1942–2020)
- June Pattullo (US, 1921–1972)
- Joseph Pedlosky (US, born 1938)
- Timothy R. Parsons (Canada, 1932–2022)
- Lloyd Peck (Britain)
- G. Michael Purdy (Britain)
- Adina Paytan
- Hans Pettersson (Sweden, 1888–1966)
- Nadia Pinardi (Italy, born 1956)
- Aditi Pant (India, born 1943)
- Lawrence R. Pomeroy (US, 1925–2020)

== Q ==
- Jimena Quirós (Spain, 1899–1983)
- Syed Zahoor Qasim (India, 1926–2015)
- Detlef Quadfasel (Germany)

== R ==
- Douglas ReVelle (US, 1945–2010)
- Christina Riesselman (US)
- Alfred C. Redfield (US, 1890–1983)
- Clare Reimers
- Gordon Arthur Riley (US, 1911–1985)
- Joellen Louise Russell (US, born 1970)
- John Francis Ropek (US, 1917–2009)
- Stefan Rahmstorf (Germany, born 1960)
- Ana Ravelo (US)
- Collin Roesler (US)
- Vladimir Ryabinin (Russia, born 1956)
- Peter A. Rona (US, 1934–2014)
- Sonia Ribes-Beaudemoulin (France, born 1953)
- Joseph L. Reid (US, 1923–2015)
- Callum Roberts (Britain)
- Moninya Roughan (Australia)
- Carl-Gustaf Rossby (US, 1898–1957)
- Dean Roemmich (US)
- Jules Richard (France, 1863–1945)
- Monika Rhein (Germany)
- Roger Revelle (US, 1909–1991)
- Rengaswamy Ramesh (India, born 1956)
- Paola Malanotte Rizzoli

== S ==
- Jaia Syvitski (US)
- Phyllis Stabeno
- Henry Stommel (US, 1920–1992)
- Paul Scully-Power (Australia, born 1944)
- Curtis A. Suttle (Canada)
- Mary Sears (US, 1905–1997)
- Deborah Steinberg (US)
- Anatoly Sagalevich (Russia/Soviet Union, born 1938)
- Gregory S. Stone (US, born 1957)
- William Sager (US, born 1954)
- Vasily Vladimirovich Shuleikin (Russia/Soviet Union, 1895–1979)
- Rick Spinrad (US)
- Harald Sverdrup (Norway, 1888–1957)
- Caroline M. Solomon (US)
- Johan Sandström (Sweden, 1874–1947)
- Yuly Shokalsky (Russia/Soviet Union, 1856–1940)
- F.G. Walton Smith (US, 1909–1989)
- Heidi Sosik (US)
- Wen Shengchang (China, 1921–2022)
- Athelstan Spilhaus (US, 1911–1998)
- Fred Spiess (US, 1919–2006)
- Odd Henrik Sælen (Norway, 1920–2008)
- Kathleen Stafford (US)
- Gerold Siedler (Germany, born 1933)
- Natacha Aguilar de Soto (Spain)
- John Steele (Scotland, 1926–2013)
- Janet Sprintall (US)
- Frank E. Snodgrass (US, 1920–1985)
- Vladimir Shtokman (Soviet Union, 1909–1968)
- Charles Dwight Sigsbee (US, 1845–1923)
- Katharine Jefferts Schori (US, born 1954)
- Sybil P. Seitzinger (US)
- Mary Wilcox Silver (US)
- Pyotr Shirshov (Soviet Union, 1905–1953)

== T ==
- Stephen Thorpe (Britain)
- David Titley (US, born 1958)
- LuAnne Thompson (US)
- Lynne Talley (US, born 1954)
- Anitra Thorhaug (US)
- Mary-Louise Timmermans
- Robert Thunell (US, 1951–2018)
- Marie Tharp (US, 1920–2006)
- Marta Torres
- Thomas Gordon Thompson (US, 1888–1961)
- Robert K. Trench (US, born 1940)
- Hendrik Tolman (Netherlands, born 1961)
- David Thornalley (Britain, born 1982)
- Zera Luther Tanner (US, 1835–1906)

== U ==
- Caroline C. Ummenhofer (Germany)

== V ==
- Victor Vacquier (US, 1907–2009)
- Allyn Vine (US)
- Gilbert L. Voss (US, 1918–1989)
- P. N. Vinayachandran (India, born 1964)
- Usha Varanasi (US)

== W ==
- Kenneth M. Watson (US, 1921–2023)
- Jan Erik Weber (Norway, born 1944)
- Andy Watson (Britain, born 1952)
- Susan Wijffels (Australia, born 1965)
- Karen Wishner (US)
- Thomas Westbrook Waldron (US, 1814–1844)
- Georg Wüst (Germany, 1890–1977)
- Bess Ward
- Lucy R. Wyatt (Britain)
- Klaus Wyrtki (US, 1925–2013)
- Angelicque White (US)
- John Francon Williams (Britain, 1854–1911)
- Don Walsh (US, born 1931)
- Charles Wilkes (US, 1798–1877)
- Josh Willis (US)
- Dawn Wright (US, born 1961)
- Patricia A. Wheeler (US, born 1949)
- Warren White (US)
- Carl Wunsch (US, born 1941)
- Richard Russell Waldron (US, 1803–1846)
- Anya Waite (Canada)
- Anna Wåhlin (Sweden, born 1970)
- Edith Widder (US, born 1951)
- John Woods (Britain, born 1939)
- Jonathan White (US)
- Val Worthington (Britain, 1920–1995)
- Philip Woodworth (Britain)
- Vladimir Wiese (Russia/Soviet Union, 1886–1954)
- Sydney Oskar Wigen (Canada, 1923–2000)
- Rebecca Woodgate
- Alexandra Worden (US, born 1970)

== X ==
- Shang-Ping Xie

== Y ==
- Lisan Yu

== Z ==
- Nikolay Nikolaevich Zubov (Russia, 1885–1960)
- Mira Zore-Armanda (1930–2012)
