= Sue Moore (scientist) =

American marine scientist

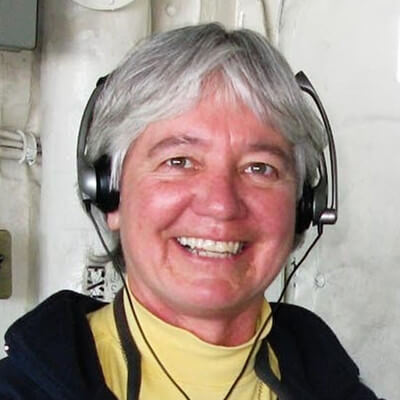
- Education: University of California, San Diego
- Scientific career
- Thesis: Cetacean habitats in the Alaskan Arctic (1997)

Sue E. Moore is a scientist at the University of Washington known for her research on marine mammals in the Arctic.

== Education and career ==
Moore has a B.A. from the University of California, San Diego and an M.S. from San Diego State University. She earned her Ph.D. from the University of California, San Diego / Scripps Institution of Oceanography in 1997 working on whales in the Arctic. Moore worked at the National Oceanic and Atmospheric Administration (NOAA) for twenty years, and was appointed director of the NOAA National Marine Mammal Laboratory in 2002. Moore was a member of the United States' delegation to the International Whaling Commission. As of 2021, Moore is a research scientist in the department of biology at the University of Washington. On May 25, 2022, Moore was nominated by US President Joe Biden to be a member of the US Marine Mammal Commission. The nomination was positively forwarded to the full Senate by the Senate Commerce, Science and Transportation Committee on December 7, 2022. The nomination was confirmed by the full US Senate on December 22, 2022.

== Research ==
Moore is known for her research tracking marine mammals in the Arctic, including bowhead whales, fin whales, and gray whales. She has used acoustic instruments, or sound, to listen to multiple species of whales along the coast of Alaska, including a project attaching acoustic instruments to gliders and then tracking marine mammals. She has linked changes in sea ice with the habitats used by bowhead whales and defined patterns in marine mammal distributions that track climate change in the Arctic.

A list of additional publications and a biographical sketch are available on the website of the Center for Ecosystem Sentinels at the University of Washington, https://ecosystemsentinels.org/sue-moore/

== Selected publications ==
- Grebmeier, Jacqueline M.; Overland, James E.; Moore, Sue E.; Farley, Ed V.; Carmack, Eddy C.; Cooper, Lee W.; Frey, Karen E.; Helle, John H.; McLaughlin, Fiona A.; McNutt, S. Lyn (2006-03-10). "A Major Ecosystem Shift in the Northern Bering Sea". Science. 311 (5766): 1461–1464. Bibcode:2006Sci...311.1461G. doi:10.1126/science.1121365. PMID 16527980. S2CID 23505224.
- Moore, Sue E.; Huntington, Henry P. (2008). "Arctic Marine Mammals and Climate Change: Impacts and Resilience". Ecological Applications. 18 (sp2): S157–S165. Bibcode:2008EcoAp..18S.157M. doi:10.1890/06-0571.1. ISSN 1939-5582. PMID 18494369.
- Moore, Sue E. (2008). "Marine mammals as ecosystem sentinels". Journal of Mammalogy. 89 (3): 534–540. doi:10.1644/07-mamm-s-312r1.1. ISSN 0022-2372. S2CID 53392780.
- Moore, Sue E; Grebmeier, Jacqueline M; Davies, Jeremy R (2003-04-01). "Gray whale distribution relative to forage habitat in the northern Bering Sea: current conditions and retrospective summary". Canadian Journal of Zoology. 81 (4): 734–742. doi:10.1139/z03-043. ISSN 0008-4301.
- Stabeno, Phyllis J.; Kachel, Nancy B.; Moore, Sue E.; Napp, Jeffrey M.; Sigler, Michael; Yamaguchi, Atsushi; Zerbini, Alexandre N. (2012). "Comparison of warm and cold years on the southeastern Bering Sea shelf and some implications for the ecosystem". Deep Sea Research Part II: Topical Studies in Oceanography. 65–70: 31–45. Bibcode:2012DSRII..65...31S. doi:10.1016/j.dsr2.2012.02.020.

== Awards and honors ==
In 2020, Moore was elected to the Washington State Academy of Sciences in recognition of her work in the Arctic. In 2020, the International Arctic Science Committee awarded the IASC Medal for "exceptional and sustained contributions to the understanding of the Arctic" to Moore.
