= Cindy Lee =

Cindy Lee may refer to:

- Cindy Lee (band), a Canadian band
- Cindy Lee (businesswoman), Canadian business executive
- Cindy Lee (scientist), American oceanographer
