= Lists of Earth scientists =

There are several lists of Earth scientists:

- List of geodesists
- List of geographers
- List of geologists
- List of geophysicists
- List of meteorologists
- List of mineralogists
- List of oceanographers
- List of paleontologists
- List of soil scientists
- List of Russian Earth scientists
