= Peter Girguis =

American scientist of microbial symbiosis

Peter R. Girguis
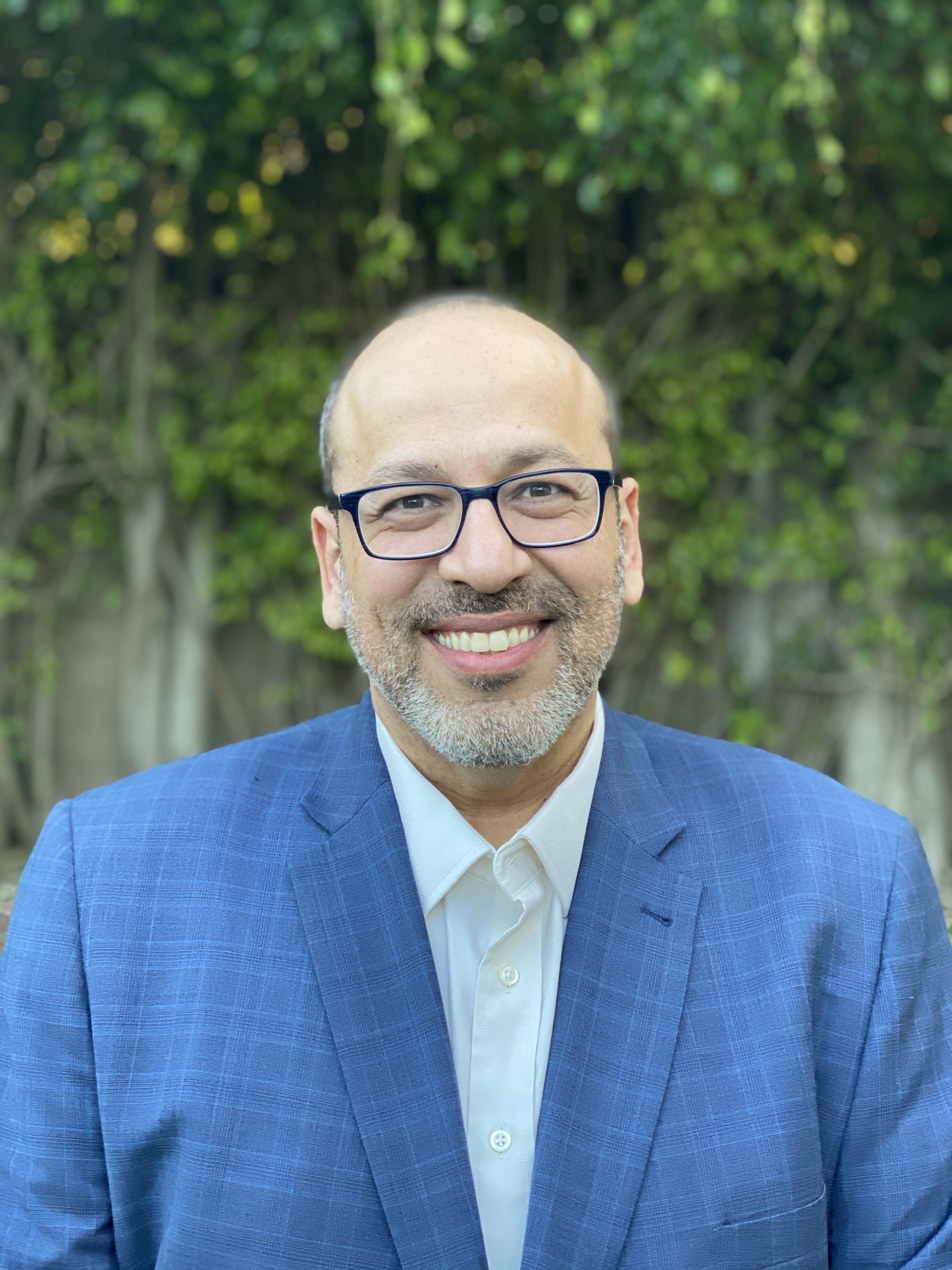
- Education: University of California Los Angeles (1995), University of California Santa Barbara (2000)
- Occupations: Professor of organismic and evolutionary biology
- Scientific career
- Fields: Research on microbiology symbiosis and ocean technology development
- Workplaces: Harvard University Adjunct Oceanographer, Applied Ocean Engineering and Physics; Woods Hole Oceanographic Institution
- Website: girguislab.oeb.harvard.edu

Peter R. Girguis is a professor in the department of Organismic and Evolutionary Biology at Harvard University, where he leads a lab that studies animals and microbes that live in extreme environments. He and his lab also develop novel underwater instruments such as underwater mass spectrometers. Girguis was the founder and Chief Technology Officer of Trophos Energy from 2010 to 2012, which focused on commercializing microbial fuel cell technologies. The company was bought by Teledyne Benthos in 2012. Girguis currently serves as a board member of the Ocean Exploration Trust and the Schmidt Marine Technology Partners.

== Early life and education ==
Girguis grew up in Downey, California, which was a hub of the aerospace industry throughout the 1970s. He later attended the University of California Los Angeles, where he worked with William Hamner and David Chapman. He graduated with a degree in Ecology and Marine Biology. He pursued his doctoral degree at the University of California Santa Barbara, working with James Childress and Robert Trench. After receiving a Packard Foundation postdoctoral fellowship, he went to the Monterey Bay Aquarium Research Institute to work on anaerobic methane oxidation with Edward DeLong. While at MBARI, and with support of Edward DeLong and Marcia McNutt, he began developing underwater mass spectrometers and deep-sea incubators.

== Research and career ==
As a graduate student, Girguis worked with Childress to develop high-pressure aquaria that would mimic the pressures and chemical conditions found around hydrothermal vents. He later incorporated a membrane inlet mass spectrometer to measure changes in dissolved gases within the aquaria. He used this system to publish some of the first, robust measurements of metabolite uptake by the deep sea vent tubeworm Riftia pachyptila. Through his research Girguis found that Riftia tubeworms and their symbionts are capable of fixing carbon dioxide at unprecedented rates, and can keep their tissues from becoming acidic by eliminating hydrogen ions at equally unprecedented rates. He was also the first person to keep vent tubeworms alive in the lab for nearly two months.

As an MBARI postdoctoral fellow, Girguis and the members of the DeLong lab developed an artificial hydrocarbon seep to grow anaerobic methane oxidizing communities. He found that, when methane and sulfate are sufficient, the anaerobic archaea grow at higher rates than previously measured. Later, as an MBARI research associate, he began developing and deploying microbial fuel cells in collaboration with Clare Reimers from Oregon State University. He also began development of an underwater mass spectrometer, with the goal of creating an "open design" instrument that could be built and used by other laboratories.

Girguis joined Harvard University in 2005 as an assistant professor in the department of Organismic and Evolutionary Biology. Broadly speaking, his lab is interested in how animals and microbes have evolved to thrive in their environments and, in turn, how their metabolic activities shape those environments. As such, the Girguis lab studies the physiological and biochemical adaptations of marine animals and microbes to their environment, their role in biogeochemical cycles, and their responses to a changing world. He is especially interested in animal-microbial symbioses from the deep-sea vent symbiosis such as Riftia pachyptila to the gut microbiomes of baleen whales. He also develops novel deep-sea instruments such as underwater mass spectrometers, microbial fuel cells, and autonomous landers. He also strives to make these tools available to the broader research community, including scientists at institutions of lesser means, with the goal of furthering scientific capabilities around the world.

== Media and public engagement ==
Girguis and his work were highlighted in 2009 film Dirt! The Movie. Girguis was also a featured educator in Shapiro School, an online production that featured scientists speaking with children. In 2023, he was featured on two episodes of the PBS Nova series Ancient Earth. In 2025, he was featured on the PBS Particles of Thought podcast with Hakeem Oluseyi, during which they discussed life in Earth's most extreme environments and the possibility of life on Mars and elsewhere.

In 2014, Girguis and Paul McGuinness co-founded the Marine Science Internship Program, a partnership between Cambridge Unified School District and Harvard University. He has supported United Nations policy makers as they work towards a new high seas treaty since 2019.

== Awards and honors ==
- Girguis was awarded the State of California's Distinguished Community Service Award in 2003 for his work in bringing marine science to underrepresented groups in Salinas, California.
- Girguis was a Distinguished Lecturer for the National Science Foundation's RIDGE program from 2006-2007.
- For his work on microbial fuel cells, Girguis was granted the 2006 Merck & Co. Innovative Research Award for studying the microbial ecology of fuel cells, the 2007 and 2011 Charles Lindbergh Foundation Award for Science and Sustainability for developing low-cost microbial fuel cells for impoverished populations, and a 2008 "honorable mention" from the Buckminster Fuller Foundation for advancing microbial fuel cell technologies.
