= Hilairy Hartnett =

American geochemist

- Education: University of Washington
- Scientific career
- Fields: Chemical Oceanography, Astrobiology, Urban Biogeochemistry and Sustainability
- Workplaces: University of Washington Arizona State University Rutgers University
- Thesis: Organic carbon input, degradation, and preservation in continental margin sediments : an assessment of the role of a strong oxygen deficient zone (1998)

Hilairy Ellen Hartnett is professor at the University of Washington known for her work on biogeochemical processes in modern and paleo-environments.

== Education and career ==
Hartnett has an A.B. from Vassar College (1990) and an M.S. from the University of Washington (1995). She earned her Ph.D. from the University of Washington in 1998. Following her Ph.D. she did postdoctoral work at Rutgers University. She was a professor at Arizona State University from 2003 to 2024.

In January 2025, Hartnett was recruited for the position of Director of the University of Washington School of Oceanography, taking over the position upon the retirement of former Director, Professor Richard Keil.

== Research ==
Hartnett began her research career focused on ocean sediment in low-oxygen environments. Following the completion of her PhD, Hartnett was accepted into a postdoctoral researcher position in Sybil P. Seitzinger's lab, continuing her study of chemical processes in ocean sediment.

After beginning her tenure as a professor at Arizona State University, Hartnett expanded her research interest to include theorising on astrobiology, including putting forth evidence suggesting earliest life forms were likely purple in color.

In 2022, Hartnett was involved in the Mayflower AI sea drone project that is sending an autonomous vehicle across the Atlantic Ocean and will collect scientific data which will provide a detailed assessment of the state of the surface ocean.

In 2022, an early paper which Hartnett co-authored (alongside her UW School of Oceanography predecessor, Richard Keil), received the 2022 John H. Martin Award from the Association for the Sciences of Limnology and Oceanography.

== Selected publications ==
- Hartnett, Hilairy E.; Keil, Richard G.; Hedges, John I.; Devol, Allan H. (1998). "Influence of oxygen exposure time on organic carbon preservation in continental margin sediments". Nature. 391 (6667): 572–575. Bibcode:1998Natur.391..572H. doi:10.1038/35351. ISSN 0028-0836. S2CID 4414277.
- Hedges, John I.; Hu, Feng Sheng; Devol, Allan H.; Hartnett, Hilairy E.; Tsamakis, Elizabeth; Keil, Richard G. (1999-11-01). "Sedimentary organic matter preservation; a test for selective degradation under oxic conditions". American Journal of Science. 299 (7–9): 529–555. Bibcode:1999AmJS..299..529H. doi:10.2475/ajs.299.7-9.529. ISSN 0002-9599.
- Hartnett, Hilairy E; Devol, Allan H (2003-01-15). "Role of a strong oxygen-deficient zone in the preservation and degradation of organic matter: a carbon budget for the continental margins of northwest Mexico and Washington State". Geochimica et Cosmochimica Acta. 67 (2): 247–264. Bibcode:2003GeCoA..67..247H. doi:10.1016/S0016-7037(02)01076-1. ISSN 0016-7037.
- Shipp, Jessie A.; Gould, Ian R.; Shock, Everett L.; Williams, Lynda B.; Hartnett, Hilairy E. (2014-07-28). "Sphalerite is a geochemical catalyst for carbon−hydrogen bond activation". Proceedings of the National Academy of Sciences. 111 (32): 11642–11645. Bibcode:2014PNAS..11111642S. doi:10.1073/pnas.1324222111. ISSN 0027-8424. PMC 4136594. PMID 25071186.

== Awards and honors ==
In 2009 Hartnett received a National Science Foundation CAREER Awards. In 2022, Hartnett received the John H. Martin Award from the Association for the Sciences of Limnology and Oceanography for her paper that introduced the concept of oxygen exposure time.
