= Margaret Mulholland =

Marine biogeochemist

- Education: University of Maryland, College Park
- Scientific career
- Workplaces: Old Dominion University
- Thesis: Nitrogen utilization, metabolism and the regulation of N₂ fixation in Trichodesmium spp. (1998)

Margaret Ruth Mulholland is professor at Old Dominion University known for her work on nutrients in marine and estuarine environments.

== Education and career ==
Mulholland has a B.S. from the University of Notre Dame (1984), and an M.S. in biological oceanography (1986) and an M.M. in marine affairs (1992) from the University of Washington. In 1998 she earned her Ph.D. in biological oceanography from the University of Maryland. As of 2022 she is a professor at Old Dominion University.

== Research ==
Mulholland's early research examined the oxidation of amino acids and nitrogen cycling by the marine bacterium Trichodesmium. Her subsequent work investigated nitrogen cycling in harmful algae including Aureococcus and Karenia brevis. She has examined how phytoplankton will respond to an ocean enriched in carbon dioxide, the impact of climate change on the Chesapeake Bay, and the contribution of nitrogen-fixing organisms to nutrient cycling. Her research tracks organic compounds in seawater, for example cyanate or compounds produced by phytoplankton. In coastal environments she has researched the impact of coastal flooding and the movement of pollution during floods. As of 2022 she has an h-index of 46 and has publications that have been cited more than 7000 times.

== Selected publications ==
- Capone, Douglas G.; Bronk, Deborah A.; Mulholland, Margaret R.; Carpenter, Edward J. (2008-08-15). Nitrogen in the Marine Environment. Elsevier. ISBN 978-0-08-055892-9.
- Mulholland, Margaret R.; Bernhardt, Peter W.; Heil, Cynthia A.; Bronk, Deborah A.; O'Neil, Judith M. (2006). "Nitrogen fixation and release of fixed nitrogen by Trichodesmium spp. in the Gulf of Mexico". Limnology and Oceanography. 51 (4): 1762–1776. Bibcode:2006LimOc..51.1762M. doi:10.4319/lo.2006.51.4.1762. ISSN 0024-3590. S2CID 15821273.
- Mulholland, Margaret R.; Gobler, Christopher J.; Lee, Cindy (2002). "Peptide hydrolysis, amino acid oxidation, and nitrogen uptake in communities seasonally dominated by Aureococcus anophagefferens". Limnology and Oceanography. 47 (4): 1094–1108. Bibcode:2002LimOc..47.1094M. doi:10.4319/lo.2002.47.4.1094. ISSN 0024-3590. S2CID 86067819.
- Mulholland, MR; Bronk, DA; Capone, DG (2004). "Dinitrogen fixation and release of ammonium and dissolved organic nitrogen by Trichodesmium IMS101". Aquatic Microbial Ecology. 37: 85–94. doi:10.3354/ame037085. ISSN 0948-3055.
