= Karen Wishner =

American oceanographer

- Education: University of California, San Diego
- Scientific career
- Workplaces: University of Rhode Island
- Thesis: The biomass and ecology of the deep-sea benthopelagic (near-bottom) plankton (1980)

Karen Frances Wishner is an American oceanographer currently at University of Rhode Island and an elected fellow of the American Association for the Advancement of Science. Her interests include coastal shelf and zooplankton behavior and environment, and has published her findings.

== Education and career ==
Wishner has a Bachelor of Arts degree in biology from the University of Chicago and as a sophomore participated in a field project in Costa Rica which sparked her interest in marine science. Wishner earned her Ph.D. in oceanography from the University of California, San Diego and Scripps Institution of Oceanography where she worked on the ecology of deep-sea plankton. During her dissertation research she collected plankton using nets attached to Deep Tow, the camera system designed by Fred Spiess. Wishner spent one term teaching at the University of California, Santa Cruz after an invitation to do so from Mary Wilcox Silver, and then moved to the University of Rhode Island in 1980 where she was the first female tenure-track faculty hired by the Graduate School of Oceanography. She was promoted to professor in 1993. Wishner's teaching portfolio included a class that investigates right whales and what they eat, with an opportunity for field research conducted from the University of Rhode Island's research ship, the R/V Endeavor. As of 2021, Wishner is emerita professor of oceanography at the University of Rhode Island.

== Research ==
Wishner is known for her research on zooplankton ecology and behavior, with a focus on copepods. Her early research was on the organisms found in the deep ocean and the rate they were able to consume other organisms. She investigates regions of the ocean with low levels of oxygen and the implications for marine zooplankton and marine food webs. One item of particular interest to Wishner is the copepods found in the oxygen minimum zone in the Arabian Sea. Wishner has also examined the shrimp found in the vicinity of hydrothermal fluids near the Kick 'em Jenny volcano and plankton in the Eastern Tropical North Pacific.

== Selected publications ==
- Wishner, K.F. (1980). "The biomass of the deep-sea benthopelagic plankton". Deep Sea Research Part A. Oceanographic Research Papers. 27 (3–4): 203–216. Bibcode:1980DSRA...27..203W. doi:10.1016/0198-0149(80)90012-6.
- Wishner, Karen F.; Ashjian, Carin J.; Gelfman, Celia; Gowing, Marcia M.; Kann, Lisa; Levin, Lisa A.; Mullineaux, Lauren S.; Saltzman, Jennifer (1 January 1995). "Pelagic and benthic ecology of the lower interface of the Eastern Tropical Pacific oxygen minimum zone". Deep Sea Research Part I: Oceanographic Research Papers. 42 (1): 93–115. Bibcode:1995DSRI...42...93W. doi:10.1016/0967-0637(94)00021-J. ISSN 0967-0637.
- Wishner, Karen F.; Gowing, Marcia M.; Gelfman, Celia (1 August 1998). "Mesozooplankton biomass in the upper 1000m in the Arabian Sea: overall seasonal and geographic patterns, and relationship to oxygen gradients". Deep Sea Research Part II: Topical Studies in Oceanography. 45 (10): 2405–2432. Bibcode:1998DSRII..45.2405W. doi:10.1016/S0967-0645(98)00078-2. ISSN 0967-0645.

== Awards and honors ==
Wishner was elected a fellow of the American Association for the Advancement of Science in 1995.
