= Kathleen Stafford =

American academic oceanographer

Kate Stafford is the Senior Principal Oceanographer in the Applied Physics Lab at the University of Washington and an affiliate Associate Professor in the School of Oceanography at the University of Washington in Seattle. She is also an Associate Professor and Principal Investigator at Oregon State University in the Marine Mammal Institute. Her research focuses on the changing acoustic landscape and the impacts of declining sea ice and human industrial influences affect Arctic marine mammals.

== Education ==
Kate Stafford received her BA in French Literature with a minor in Biology from the University of California, Santa Cruz in 1989.

She received her master's degree in Wildlife Biology from Oregon State University in 1995 and her doctorate in Interdisciplinary Oceanography from Oregon State University in 2001.

== Research ==
Kate Stafford's research uses passive acoustic monitoring to study the migration of and changes to the habitat of large marine mammals, in particular large whales. Most of her research is based in the polar regions, with a specific focus on the Arctic. Her research looks at how climate change influences the occurrence of Arctic endemic and sub-Arctic species.
