= Susan Humphris =

Marin geochemist

Susan Elizabeth Humphris
- Education: Massachusetts Institute of Technology; Woods Hole Oceanographic Institution
- Scientific career
- Workplaces: Woods Hole Oceanographic Institution
- Thesis: The hydrothermal alteration of oceanic basalts by seawater (1976)
- Doctoral advisor: Geoff Thompson

Susan E. Humphris is an American-British geologist known for her research on processes at mid-ocean ridges. She is an elected fellow of the American Geophysical Union.

== Education and career ==
Humphris grew up in the United Kingdom, where she learned to sail and enjoyed hikes that incited her interest in the natural world. As a child, she was not fond of history classes, but enjoyed the other subjects. Humphris has an undergraduate degree from Lancaster University (1972), and earned her Ph.D. in 1976 from the Massachusetts Institute of Technology and Woods Hole Oceanographic Institution. Following her Ph.D., she spent time as a postdoc at Imperial College in London and a year at Lamont–Doherty Earth Observatory. For more than a decade, Humphris was a staff scientist at Sea Education Association before she joined the staff at Woods Hole Oceanographic Institution in 1992.

In 2013, Humphris was elected a fellow of the American Geophysical Union who cited her "For sustained and exemplary contributions to our understanding of volcanic and hydrothermal processes at mid-oceanic ridges".

== Research ==
Humphris' research started with investigations into high temperature alterations of oceanic basalts. She has examined the geochemistry of hydrothermal systems at multiple locations including the Walvis Ridge in the South Atlantic, the mid-ocean ridges near Tristan da Cunha the TAG vent field, and Lucky Strike. Humphris worked with the team that found evidence of life in ancient rocks in samples drilled from the Earth's mantle. She has participated in multiple dives to the seafloor in submersibles including Nadir and Alvin, and was the lead scientist for the 2012 overhaul of the DSV Alvin. In 2018, she summarized scientists' progress in understanding the controls on hydrothermal vent fluid composition in an article published in Annual Review of Marine Science.

=== Selected publications ===
- Humphris, Susan E.; Thompson, Geoffrey (January 1978). "Trace element mobility during hydrothermal alteration of oceanic basalts". Geochimica et Cosmochimica Acta. 42 (1): 127–136. Bibcode:1978GeCoA..42..127H. doi:10.1016/0016-7037(78)90222-3.
- Humphris, Susan E.; Thompson, Geoffrey (January 1978). "Hydrothermal alteration of oceanic basalts by seawater". Geochimica et Cosmochimica Acta. 42 (1): 107–125. Bibcode:1978GeCoA..42..107H. doi:10.1016/0016-7037(78)90221-1. hdl:1721.1/54260.
- Campbell, A. C.; Palmer, M. R.; Klinkhammer, G. P.; Bowers, T. S.; Edmond, J. M.; Lawrence, J. R.; Casey, J. F.; Thompson, G.; Humphris, S.; Rona, P.; Karson, J. A. (October 1988). "Chemistry of hot springs on the Mid-Atlantic Ridge". Nature. 335 (6190): 514–519. Bibcode:1988Natur.335..514C. doi:10.1038/335514a0. S2CID 4310961.
- Dover, C. L. Van; Humphris, S. E.; Fornari, D.; Cavanaugh, C. M.; Collier, R.; Goffredi, S. K.; Hashimoto, J.; Lilley, M. D.; Reysenbach, A. L.; Shank, T. M.; Damm, K. L. Von; Banta, A.; Gallant, R. M.; Götz, D.; Green, D.; Hall, J.; Harmer, T. L.; Hurtado, L. A.; Johnson, P.; McKiness, Z. P.; Meredith, C.; Olson, E.; Pan, I. L.; Turnipseed, M.; Won, Y.; C. R. Young, I. I. I.; Vrijenhoek, R. C. (26 October 2001). "Biogeography and Ecological Setting of Indian Ocean Hydrothermal Vents". Science. 294 (5543): 818–823. Bibcode:2001Sci...294..818V. doi:10.1126/science.1064574. PMID 11557843. S2CID 543841.
- Humphris, Susan E.; Herzig, P. M.; Miller, D. J.; Alt, J. C.; Becker, K.; Brown, D.; Brügmann, G.; Chiba, H.; Fouquet, Y.; Gemmell, J.B.; Guerin, G.; Hannington, M.D.; Holm, N. G.; Honnorez, J.J.; Iturrino, G.J.; Knott, R.; Ludwig, R.; Nakamura, K.; Petersen, S.; Reysenbach, A-L.; Rona, P. A.; Smith, S.; Sturz, A.A; Tivey, M.K.; Zhao, X. (October 1995). "The internal structure of an active sea-floor massive sulphide deposit". Nature. 377 (6551): 713–716. Bibcode:1995Natur.377..713H. doi:10.1038/377713a0. hdl:2027.42/62783. S2CID 4279891.

== Awards and honors ==
- Nap J Buonaparte Service Award, Massachusetts Marine Educators (2003)
- Fellow, American Geophysical Union (2013)
