= Katherine Barbeau =

Marine biogeochemist

- Education: Massachusetts Institute of Technology; Woods Hole Oceanographic Institution
- Scientific career
- Thesis: Influence of protozoan grazing on the marine geochemistry of particle reactive trace metals (1998)

Katherine Barbeau is a professor at Scripps Institution of Oceanography known for her work on trace metals and the linkages between trace metals and biology.

== Education and career ==
Barbeau graduated from Mercy High School in Middleton, Connecticut. She has a B.S. from Southampton College (1991), and then moved to the Université libre de Bruxelles for one year. She earned a Ph.D. from the Massachusetts Institute of Technology and Woods Hole Oceanographic Institution in 1998. Following her Ph.D. she was a postdoctoral researcher at the University of California, Santa Barbara until 2001 when she joined the faculty at Scripps Institution of Oceanography.

== Research ==
Barbeau is known for her work on trace metals, and how marine microorganisms interact with trace metals. Her early work examined how protozoan grazers relieve iron limitation in phytoplankton. Through this research, Barbeau developed new analytical methods, which she applied in the field. Her subsequent research has examined photochemical interactions with metal compounds and iron limitation in the California Current. Her research has also investigated copper levels in the Pacific Ocean, organic compounds that bind to metals in estuaries, and the mechanisms used by bacteria to incorporate metals such as iron into the cell

Katherine Barbeau continues to have her research interests lie in Biogeochemical cycling of trace metals in marine systems (focusing specifically on the Fe, Ni, and Cu metals), Biological transformations of trace metal speciation (the acquisition of trace metals), photochemical redox reactions of trace metals, and metals as limiting or co-limiting micronutrients in marine systems.

== Selected publications ==
- Barbeau, Katherine; Moffett, James W.; Caron, David A.; Croot, Peter L.; Erdner, Deana L. (1996). "Role of protozoan grazing in relieving iron limitation of phytoplankton". Nature. 380 (6569): 61–64. Bibcode:1996Natur.380...61B. doi:10.1038/380061a0. ISSN 0028-0836. S2CID 4272661.
- Barbeau, K.; Rue, E. L.; Bruland, K. W.; Butler, A. (2001). "Photochemical cycling of iron in the surface ocean mediated by microbial iron(iii)-binding ligands". Nature. 413 (6854): 409–413. Bibcode:2001Natur.413..409B. doi:10.1038/35096545. ISSN 0028-0836. PMID 11574885. S2CID 4333988.
- Barbeau, Katherine; Zhang, Guangping; Live, David H.; Butler, Alison (2002-01-01). "Petrobactin, a Photoreactive Siderophore Produced by the Oil-Degrading Marine Bacterium Marinobacter hydrocarbonoclasticus". Journal of the American Chemical Society. 124 (3): 378–379. doi:10.1021/ja0119088. ISSN 0002-7863. PMID 11792199.
- Barbeau, Katherine; Rue, Eden L.; Trick, Charles G.; Bruland, Kenneth W.; Butler, Alison (2003). "Photochemical reactivity of siderophores produced by marine heterotrophic bacteria and cyanobacteria based on characteristic Fe(III) binding groups". Limnology and Oceanography. 48 (3): 1069–1078. Bibcode:2003LimOc..48.1069B. doi:10.4319/lo.2003.48.3.1069. S2CID 12689785.
- Barbeau, Katherine (2006). "Photochemistry of Organic Iron(III) Complexing Ligands in Oceanic Systems". Photochemistry and Photobiology. 82 (6): 1505–1516. doi:10.1111/j.1751-1097.2006.tb09806.x. ISSN 0031-8655. PMID 16968114. S2CID 222101557.

== Awards and honors ==
- NASA new investigator (2002)
- Scripps Institution of Oceanography excellence in teaching (2012)
