= Michèle Marie Fieux =

French oceanographer

Michèle Marie Fieux (born 25 October 1940) is a French oceanographer.

The daughter of Joseph Fieux and Paule Brunot, she was born in Neuilly-sur-Seine. She was educated at the Lycée Hélène Boucher in Paris and attended university in Paris. From 1968 to 1977, Fieux was a research engineer at the Centre National pour l'Exploitation des Océans and, from 1978, at the Centre national de la recherche scientifique. From 1973 to 1975, she was a research associate at the Woods Hole Oceanographic Institution. She became a professor of oceanography at the ENSTA ParisTech in 1979. Her primary area of interest is the hydrology and dynamics of the Indian Ocean and through flow between the Pacific and Indian oceans. She is a researcher at the Laboratoire d'Océanographie Dynamique et du Climat at Pierre and Marie Curie University.

Fieux is a member of the American Geophysical Union, The Oceanography Society and the Académie de Marine.

She was awarded a medal by the French Oceanographic Society in 1985. She received the Albatross Award from the American Miscellaneous Society in 1991 and the Tchihatchef prize in 1992. In 2000, she was named a Chevalier in the French Legion of Honour. In 2011, she was awarded the Prix des sciences de la mer by IFREMER.
