= LuAnne Thompson =

Oceanographer

LuAnn Thompson
- Education: Massachusetts Institute of Technology; Woods Hole Oceanographic Institution
- Scientific career
- Workplaces: University of Washington
- Thesis: Flow over finite isolated topography (1991)

LuAnn Thompson is the Walters Endowed Professor at the University of Washington. She is known for her work in modeling the movement of heat and chemicals via ocean currents.

== Education and career ==
Thompson grew up in northern California and was interested in astrophysics. She received a B.S. in physics from the University of California, Davis (1983), an M.A. in physics from Harvard University (1986), and a Ph.D. from Massachusetts Institute of Technology and the Woods Hole Oceanographic Institution (1990). Following her Ph.D. she moved to the University of Washington first as a post-doctoral fellow, and then she joined the faculty in 1993. She was promoted to professor in 2010 and named the Walters Professor of Oceanography in 2016.

== Research ==
Thompson's early research developed models of water flow and used laboratory experiments to examine the production of eddies. Subsequent research examined the factors controlling sea surface height, which she measures using data from satellites, and the physical conditions in the ocean that lead to the formation of water masses. Through collaborative projects she has examined how changes in water circulation alter the oxygen levels in seawater and how marine heatwaves will impact marine ecosystems. In ongoing policy discussions, Thompson seeks to use science to support discussions on climate change and analyzes factors limiting promotion of women in science.

== Selected publications ==
- Kwon, Young-Oh; Alexander, Michael A.; Bond, Nicholas A.; Frankignoul, Claude; Nakamura, Hisashi; Qiu, Bo; Thompson, Lu Anne (15 June 2010). "Role of the Gulf Stream and Kuroshio–Oyashio Systems in Large-Scale Atmosphere–Ocean Interaction: A Review". Journal of Climate. 23 (12): 3249–3281. Bibcode:2010JCli...23.3249K. doi:10.1175/2010JCLI3343.1. hdl:1912/3971. S2CID 2880600.
- Deutsch, Curtis; Brix, Holger; Ito, Taka; Frenzel, Hartmut; Thompson, LuAnne (15 July 2011). "Climate-Forced Variability of Ocean Hypoxia". Science. 333 (6040): 336–339. Bibcode:2011Sci...333..336D. doi:10.1126/science.1202422. PMID 21659566. S2CID 11752699.
- Meehl, Gerald A.; Arblaster, Julie M.; Chung, Christine T. Y.; Holland, Marika M.; DuVivier, Alice; Thompson, LuAnne; Yang, Dongxia; Bitz, Cecilia M. (December 2019). "Sustained ocean changes contributed to sudden Antarctic sea ice retreat in late 2016". Nature Communications. 10 (1): 14. Bibcode:2019NatCo..10...14M. doi:10.1038/s41467-018-07865-9. PMC 6312884. PMID 30600315. S2CID 57241165.
- Vivier, Frédéric; Kelly, Kathryn A.; Thompson, Lu Anne (1 December 2002). "Heat Budget in the Kuroshio Extension Region: 1993–99". Journal of Physical Oceanography. 32 (12): 3436–3454. Bibcode:2002JPO....32.3436V. doi:10.1175/1520-0485(2002)032<3436:HBITKE>2.0.CO;2.

== Awards and honors ==
Thompson was named a fellow of the American Meteorological Society in 2014.
