= Rebecca Woodgate =

Oceanographer

- Education: University of Oxford
- Scientific career
- Thesis: Data assimilation in ocean models (1994)

Rebecca Woodgate is a professor at the University of Washington known for her work on ocean circulation in polar regions.

== Education and career ==
Woodgate has a B.A. from the University of Cambridge (1990) and a Ph.D. from the University of Oxford (1994). Following her Ph.D., she was a postdoctoral researcher at the Alfred Wegener Institute for Polar and Marine Research. In 1999, she moved to the University of Washington and, as of 2022, she is a professor at the University of Washington.

== Research ==
Woodgate's early research centered on data assimilation in models and currents near Greenland. She has examined physical properties of the water masses in the Arctic Ocean, and the movement of the water masses in the region. Her research also focuses on the flow of freshwater through the Bering Strait and the changes in the water flowing through the Bering Strait over time. Woodgate's research also informs understanding of the role of freshwater in the Arctic, and the interactions between the Arctic Ocean and sea ice in the region. Her research uses moored instruments to observe conditions in the Arctic Ocean.

== Selected publications ==
- Woodgate, Rebecca A. (2005). "Revising the Bering Strait freshwater flux into the Arctic Ocean". Geophysical Research Letters. 32 (2). Bibcode:2005GeoRL..32.2602W. doi:10.1029/2004gl021747. ISSN 0094-8276. S2CID 129640531.
- Serreze, Mark C.; Barrett, Andrew P.; Slater, Andrew G.; Woodgate, Rebecca A.; Aagaard, Knut; Lammers, Richard B.; Steele, Michael; Moritz, Richard; Meredith, Michael; Lee, Craig M. (2006-11-21). "The large-scale freshwater cycle of the Arctic". Journal of Geophysical Research. 111 (C11). Bibcode:2006JGRC..11111010S. doi:10.1029/2005jc003424. ISSN 0148-0227.
- Woodgate, Rebecca A. (2018-01-01). "Increases in the Pacific inflow to the Arctic from 1990 to 2015, and insights into seasonal trends and driving mechanisms from year-round Bering Strait mooring data". Progress in Oceanography. 160: 124–154. Bibcode:2018PrOce.160..124W. doi:10.1016/j.pocean.2017.12.007. ISSN 0079-6611.
- Woodgate, Rebecca A.; Weingartner, Tom; Lindsay, Ron (2010). "The 2007 Bering Strait oceanic heat flux and anomalous Arctic sea-ice retreat". Geophysical Research Letters. 37 (1): n/a. Bibcode:2010GeoRL..37.1602W. doi:10.1029/2009gl041621. ISSN 0094-8276. S2CID 38378097.
- Woodgate, Rebecca A.; Weingartner, Thomas J.; Lindsay, Ron (2012). "Observed increases in Bering Strait oceanic fluxes from the Pacific to the Arctic from 2001 to 2011 and their impacts on the Arctic Ocean water column". Geophysical Research Letters. 39 (24). Bibcode:2012GeoRL..3924603W. doi:10.1029/2012GL054092. ISSN 1944-8007. S2CID 12841025.
