= Usha Varanasi =

American oceanic scientist

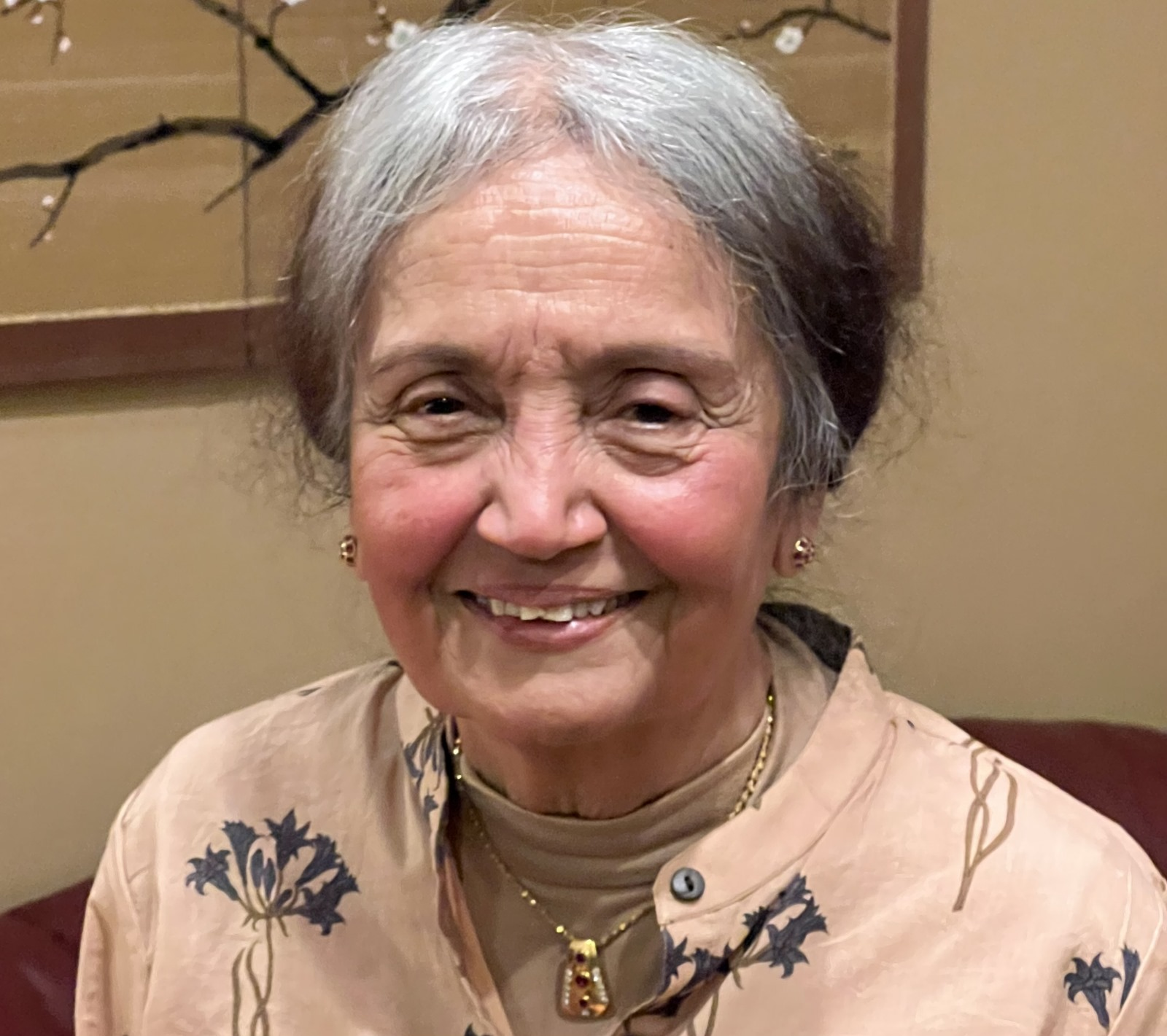
- Usha Varanasi is an Indian-American marine scientist known for her contributions to environmental chemistry and toxicology.
- Born: c. 1941 (age 84–85); Burma (now called Myanmar). Grew up in India.
- Education: University of Washington; California Institute of Technology; Bombay University
- Known for: Contributions to environmental chemistry and toxicology
- Spouse: S. Rao Varanasi
- Awards: U.S. Presidential Rank Award for Meritorious Service | Gold Medal Award from U.S. Department of Commerce | Proclamation of March 3, 2011, as Dr. Usha Varanasi Day by Washington State Gov. Christine Gregoire
- Scientific career
- Fields: Marine science, ecotoxicity, chemistry
- Workplaces: University of Washington

Usha Varanasi is an Indian-American marine scientist who in 1994 became the first woman to lead one of the National Oceanic and Atmospheric Administration's major field laboratories for fisheries, until her retirement in 2010. Currently, she focuses on questions about how exposure to nature can improve people's health. She is an Elected Fellow of the American Association for the Advancement of Science and the Washington State Academy of Sciences.

As an affiliate professor at University of Washington's College of the Environment, Varanasi serves on the steering committee for its Nature and Health Center, a multidisciplinary undertaking that aims to better understand how experiences in nature impact human health and well-being, and benefit both people and the environment.

== Background and education ==
Born in Burma (now called Myanmar) and educated in India, Varanasi received a Bachelor of Science degree from Bombay University in 1961. She traveled to the United States after earning a scholarship to the California Institute of Technology. Varanasi graduated from Caltech with a Master of Science degree in chemistry in 1963. She then completed her doctoral program at the University of Washington (UW) in 1968, specializing in organic chemistry.

== Career ==
Varanasi joined Seattle University in 1969 to study the chemistry of the head tissues of porpoises believed to be involved in echolocation, even though, as she said she "had no idea what a porpoise was" nor had much experience in biological chemistry. There were few chemistry jobs available at the time in the Seattle area and she was open to learning and investigating different fields.

She joined NOAA's Northwest Fisheries Science Center in 1975 to study uptake and metabolism of petroleum hydrocarbons in marine organisms. Varanasi stayed at the agency for 35 years, becoming the first woman to lead one of NOAA's nine major field laboratories for fisheries in 1994, and held the position of Science and Research Director of its Northwest Fisheries Science Center for 16 years till her retirement in 2010.

Her work was recognized in 1993 by the U.S. Department of Commerce's highest award — the Gold Medal — for advancing NOAA's scientific and management capabilities to respond to coastal pollution problems. In 2000, she received the U.S. Presidential Rank Award for Meritorious Service, for leadership that resulted in multidisciplinary research programs for management and conservation of salmon and marine groundfish on the U.S. West Coast.

From 2004 to 2010, Varanasi was the director of NOAA's West Coast Center of Excellence for Ocean and Human Health, when it studied how degradation of oceans and aquatic ecosystems can affect the health and well-being of people. From 2007-2010, Varanasi also served as the lead for the U.S. Commerce Department (through NOAA) on the executive committee of the West Coast Governors Agreement on Ocean Health. From 2008-2011, she served on the inaugural science panel for Puget Sound partnership.

In 2011, Varanasi was appointed a distinguished scholar in residence at the UW's College of the Environment and was elected a member of the Washington State Academy of Sciences. From 2012 to 2016, she was associated with its School of Law. She is currently an affiliate professor in the UW's Chemistry department, School of Aquatic and Fishery Sciences.

Varanasi's broad scientific interests include chemistry, environmental toxicology, fishery and the connections between nature and human health.

Her professional accomplishments include:

- Discoveries about bioavailability and processing of chemical contaminants by marine organisms, work that has improved scientific assessments (by government agencies and the private sector) of how oil spills and other chemical pollution impact fishery resources and seafood safety.
- Research and leadership contributions that have increased understanding and application of science to regulatory, management and public-policy decisions for marine and anadromous species and their ecosystems.
- Findings on how marine mammals process sound, which helped lead to identification of the molecular basis for echolocation.
- Recent publications on cultivating an ethics of reciprocity in humans' relationship with nature that would benefit both human and ecological health.

== Research ==
Her interests include marine conservation, environmental toxicology and chemistry. Her research on process contaminants and marine organisms accumulation were responsible for the scientific advancement of assessing the impact of oil's pollution on fishery resources. Her highest paper is Metabolism of polycyclic aromatic hydrocarbons in the aquatic environment, which was cited 285 times, according to Google Scholar.

Over the years, Varanasi's research demonstrated how marine organisms accumulate and process environmental contaminants such as hydrocarbons, the toxic components of petroleum products. She and her team studied the health of fish in the Puget Sound near Seattle, and acquired expertise in oil spill detection and rapid analysis. Those methods were used during NOAA's seafood safety response after environmental catastrophes, including Exxon Valdez oil spill in Alaska, the Persian Gulf War, Hurricane Katrina and Deepwater Horizon disaster in the Gulf of Mexico.

== Publications ==
Varanasi has published more than 150 peer-reviewed articles in scientific journals. She edited the book “Metabolism of Polycyclic Aromatic Hydrocarbons in the Aquatic Environment" and co-edited “Evaluating and Communicating Subsistence Seafood Safety in a Cross-Cultural Context: Lessons Learned from the Exxon-Valdez Oil Spill."

- 2021. U. Varanasi. Casting a wide net and making the most of the catch. ICES Journal of Marine Science, doi:10.1093/icesjms/fsab023
- 2020. U. Varanasi, Focusing Attention on Reciprocity between Nature and Humans Can be the Key to Reinvigorating Planetary Health. Ecopsychology Vol 12:3, pp 188-194
- 2013. U. Varanasi. Making Science Useful in Complex Political and Legal Arenas: A Case for Frontloading Science in Anticipation of Environmental Changes to Support Natural Resource Laws and Policies. Washington Journal of Environmental Law and Policy, Vol 3:2, pp 238–265
- 2012. U. Varanasi. Frontloading Science in Anticipation of Environmental Disasters. Fisheries, Vol.37 No.5.
- 2011. U. Varanasi. Bridging Science and Policy: Challenges and Successes in Puget Sound. Salish Sea Ecosystem Conference Proceedings.

== Philanthropy ==
Varanasi, along with her husband S. Rao Varanasi, have supported the University of Washington in multiple ways, including creation of the Varanasi Quantitative Undergraduate Summer Internship Program in 2012 which connects UW students majoring in quantitative and computer sciences with fisheries sciences.
