= David Thornalley =

British paleoceanographer

David John Robert Thornalley
- Born: July 28, 1982
- Education: M.A. (Cantab.), PhD (Cantab.)
- Alma mater: University of Cambridge (Ph.D., 2008)
- Scientific career
- Fields: Paleoceanography, Paleoclimatology, Geochemistry
- Workplaces: University College London
- Thesis: Palaeoceanography of the South Iceland Rise over the past 21,000 years
- Doctoral advisor: Harry Elderfield and Nick McCave

David John Robert Thornalley is a British paleoceanographer known for his work on North Atlantic circulation change during the Quaternary period. Thornalley holds masters and doctoral degrees from Churchill College, Cambridge. He is currently a professor in the department of Geography at University College London (UCL). Before working at UCL, he was a postdoctoral research scholar at Woods Hole Oceanographic Institution and a postdoctoral research associate at Cardiff University. Thornalley also holds a Professional Certificate in Teaching and Learning in Higher and Professional Education.

== Awards ==
In 2015 Thornalley was awarded the UCL Student Choice Outstanding Teacher award.

In 2016 Thornalley was awarded a £100,000 Philip Leverhulme Prize for early-career researchers with internationally impactful research.
