= Mark R. Abbott =

WHOI president

- Education: University of California, Berkeley (BS); University of California, Davis (PhD)
- Title: President and Director of Woods Hole Oceanographic Institution

Mark R. Abbott was the director and president of the Woods Hole Oceanographic Institution (WHOI) from 2015 to 2020. Prior to joining WHOI, he was a dean at Oregon State University, and conducted research with the Jet Propulsion Laboratory, Office of Naval Research, and the Scripps Institution of Oceanography. His oceanographic research focuses primarily on upper ocean biological and physical processes.
