= Mayflower AI sea drone =

Autonomous research vessel

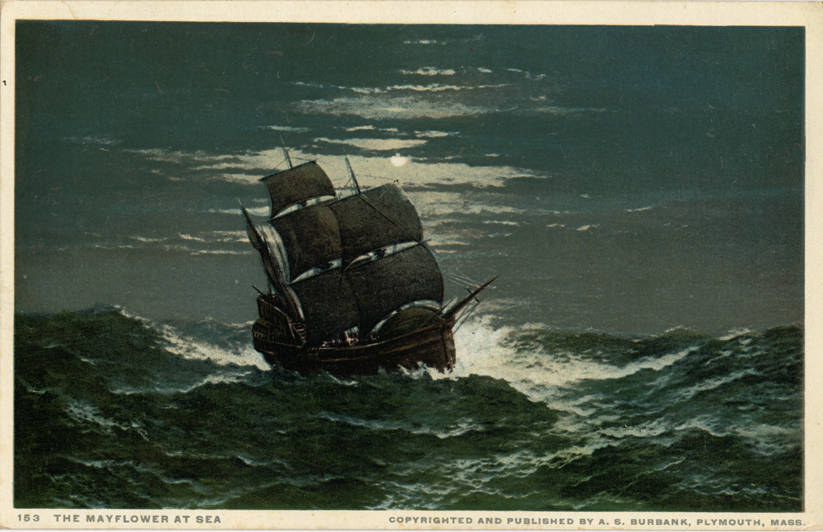
The Mayflower AI sea drone was named after the early 17th century sailing ship Mayflower.

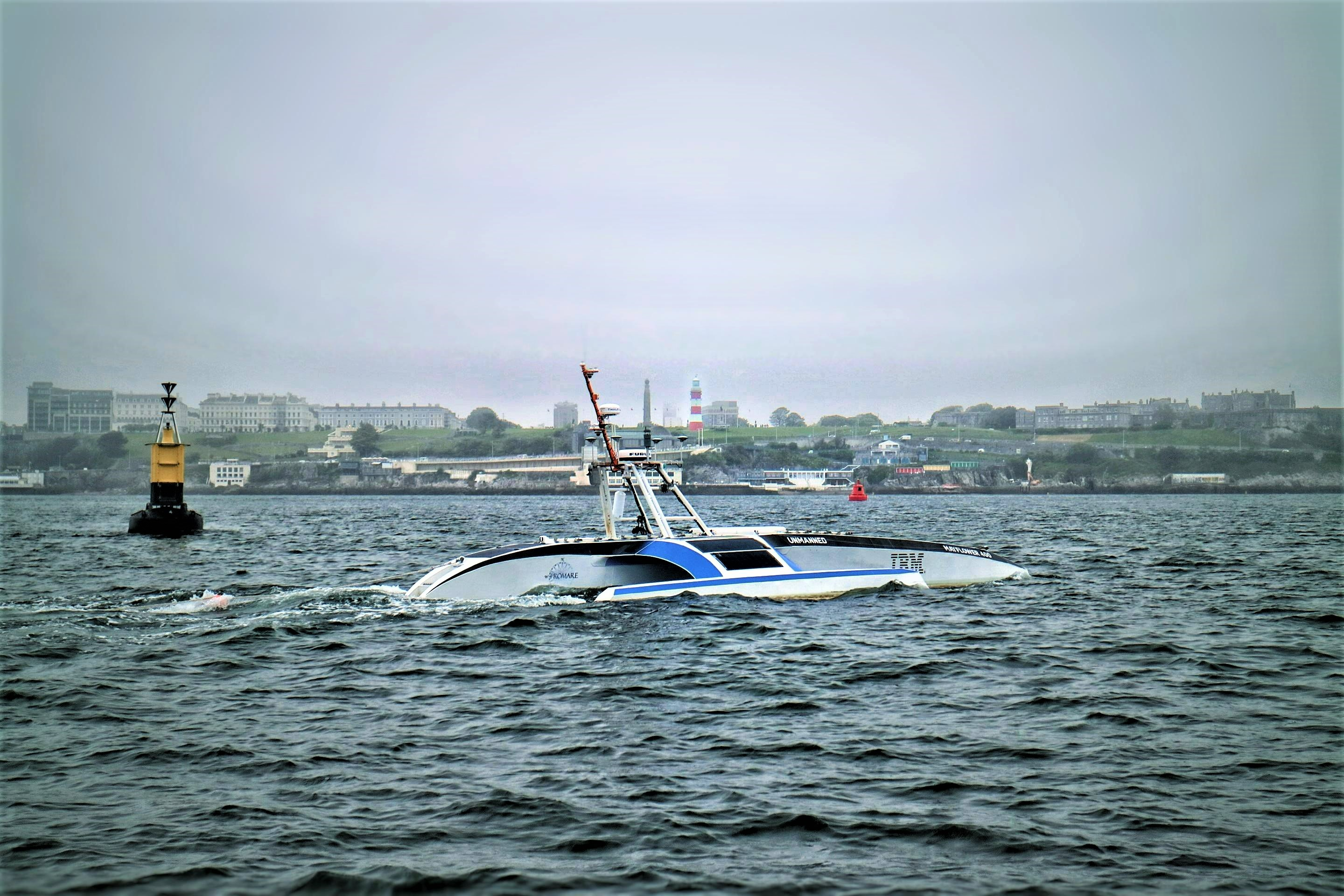
Mayflower Autonomous Ship inside Plymouth Sound

Mayflower AI sea drone, or Mayflower Autonomous Ship, or Mayflower 400 (MAS400) is an autonomous research vessel that aimed to cross the Atlantic without human crew or assistance. It is named after the Mayflower sailing ship, that carried English and Dutch Pilgrims onboard from England to New England between September and November 1620. Taking the same route, it was originally intended to set sail in September 2020 for in time for the 400th anniversary.

The 15-meter long aluminum trimaran is solar-powered and is capable of speeds of up to 10 knots (20 km/h). It has a back up diesel generator. The ship cost $1.3 million to build and is owned by the not for profit marine research organization ProMare in partnership with computer-tech company IBM. The ship can sample the water for pollutants and study marine life during its voyage.

A three-week voyage was planned; the Mayflower 400 was to sail from Plymouth UK, navigate through the Isles of Scilly and over the site of the sunken Titanic to land in Plymouth, Massachusetts. The Mayflower Autonomous Ship has a highly trained “captain” and a “navigator” knowledgeable in the rules of avoiding collisions at sea. Both functions are controlled by artificial intelligence (AI).

MAS400 began its first transatlantic attempt on June 15, 2021. Only three days later, the autonomous ship had to return to England after suffering mechanical problems.

The Mayflower's second attempt began April 27, 2022, departing from England bound this time for Virginia. After about one month at sea, the vehicle "developed an issue with the charging circuit for the generator starter batteries." The decision was made to switch to backup navigation and divert to Halifax, Nova Scotia, arriving there on June 9th after being towed the last 186 nautical miles. After the issues attributed to basic ground faults were corrected, Mayflower continued its voyage but changed its final destination back to the original planned port of Plymouth, Massachusetts, docking there on June 30, 2022, alongside the replica Mayflower II.

Since its 2022 voyage, the Mayflower has been located at Woods Hole Oceanographic Institution where scientists have been preparing the vessel for future research activities.
