= Mike Coffin =

American oceanographer

Mike (Millard Filmore) Coffin is an American oceanographer who was born in 1955 in Maine. His research expertise encompasses massive volcanism on the seafloor, environmental effects of massive volcanism, plate tectonics, and rifted continental margins.

Educated at Dartmouth College (AB) and Columbia University (MA, MPhil, PhD), he has pursued an international career in oceanography.

Following university studies, he worked at Geoscience Australia (1985-1989), the University of Texas at Austin (1990-2001), the University of Tokyo (2001-2007), the Japan Agency for Marine-Earth Science and Technology (2002-2003), the UK’s University of Southampton and National Oceanography Centre (2007-2010), and the University of Tasmania (2011–present).

He has also held visiting positions at Dartmouth College (1982), the University of Oslo (1992, 1996), Geoscience Australia (2000), France’s University of Strasbourg (2001), and the University of Hawaii (2002).

From 2003-2005, he served as the inaugural chair of the Science Planning Committee of the Integrated Ocean Drilling Program, the largest international program in the earth and ocean sciences, and among the largest in any scientific discipline.

Professor Coffin has led or participated in 36 research expeditions at sea, focusing mainly in the Southern, Pacific, and Indian oceans.
