= Mark Ohman =

American oceanographer

Mark D. Ohman is an American Biological Oceanographer. He is Distinguished Professor of the Graduate Division at the Scripps Institution of Oceanography, University of California, San Diego. He is Director and Lead Principal Investigator of the California Current Ecosystem Long-Term Ecological Research site, supported by the U.S. National Science Foundation.

Ohman has published over 155 peer-reviewed scientific articles on topics including the population ecology of marine zooplankton, especially planktonic copepods; Climate change effects on California Current pelagic food webs; Trait-based approaches to zooplankton ecology; Microscale optical and acoustic distributions of zooplankton via Zooglider; Digital imaging of zooplankton and Deep Learning classification; High frequency multi-disciplinary moorings; El Niño–Southern Oscillation effects on zooplankton populations; Predator-prey interactions; Mortality estimation and other demographic techniques for stage-structured zooplankton populations; Zooplankton Diel Vertical Migration; and other subjects.

Ohman earned his PhD in Biological Oceanography from the University of Washington, Seattle. He spent one postdoctoral research year at the Friday Harbor Laboratories, Washington, followed by a postdoctoral year in New Zealand at the New Zealand Oceanographic Institute (now NIWA) and the University of Otago, prior to moving to Scripps. He collaborates extensively internationally with colleagues on both sides of the Pacific and Atlantic oceans. He has spent 3 sabbatical leaves in France, two at the Laboratoire Océanologique de Villefranche-sur-mer and one at the Sorbonne.

Two species of planktonic copepods have been named for him. Xancithrix ohmani was discovered near the abyssal sea floor in the Southeast Atlantic and described by E.L. Markhaseva (2012), and Megacalanus ohmani was found in bathypelagic (deep ocean) waters of the Southwest Pacific near Western New Guinea and described by J.M. Bradford-Grieve and colleagues (2017).

Ohman is an Elected Fellow of the American Association for the Advancement of Science, a Sustaining Fellow of the Association for the Sciences of Limnology and Oceanography, and a member of the Ecological Society of America, the World Association of Copepodologists, the American Geophysical Union, and the Royal Society of New Zealand.
