= Roberta Marinelli =

American oceanographer

Roberta Louise Marinelli
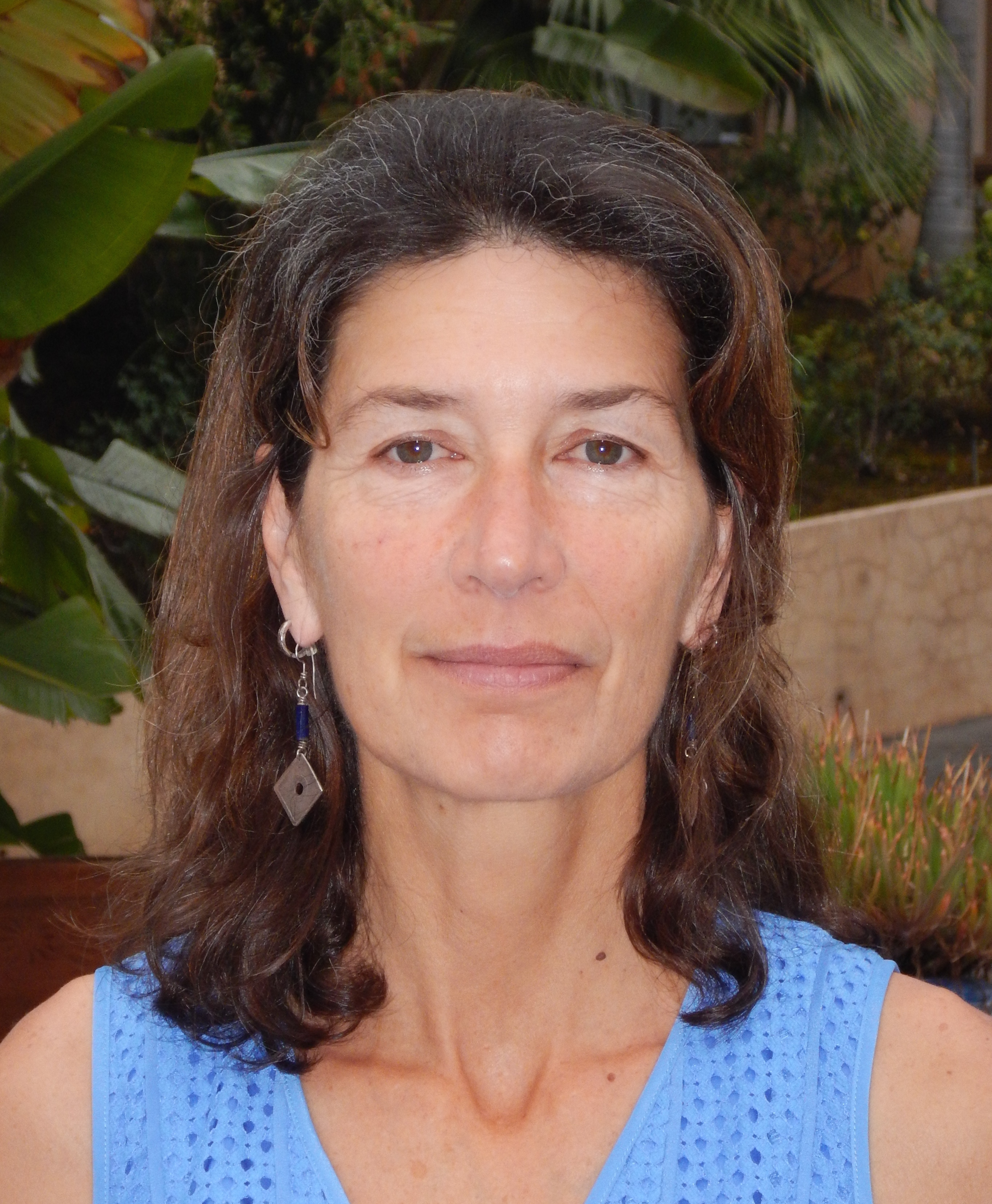
- Education: University of South Carolina
- Scientific career
- Workplaces: College of Earth, Ocean and Atmospheric Sciences; Oregon State University
- Thesis: Interactions between some infaunal polychaetes and pore water solutes in marine sedimentary environments (1991)

Roberta Marinelli is an oceanographer and Professor in the College of Earth, Ocean and Atmospheric Sciences at Oregon State University. From 2016 to 2022, she was Dean of this college.

In honor of her service to the United States Antarctic program, Marinelli Head in the McMurdo Dry Valleys of Antarctica was named after Marinelli in 2011.

== Education ==
Marinelli has an A.B. in Environmental Studies from Brown University (1982), an M.S. from the University of South Carolina (1985) and Ph.D. in Marine Science from the University of South Carolina (1991).

== Career ==
After graduate school, Marinelli took a position at Skidaway Institute of Oceanography and then went to work at the National Science Foundation (NSF) first serving as a rotator and then in Antarctic Biology and Medicine as associate program manager. While at NSF, Marinelli worked to build programs spanning multiple disciplines at NSF including the International Polar Year and the Science, Engineering and Education for Sustainability (SEES) program. Marinelli spent from 2000 to 2005 on the faculty of the University of Maryland, Center for Environmental Science, before returning to the NSF as the Program Director of Antarctic Biology and Medicine.

From 2011 to 2016 Marinelli was the Director of the USC Wrigley Institute for Environmental Studies, part of the University of Southern California. During the 20 year celebration at the Wrigley Institute, Marinelli focused on the bringing peoples' attention to the coastal environment.

In 2016, Marinelli started her position as dean of the College of Earth, Ocean and Atmospheric Sciences which is leading a >$100 million project for a new research vessel to be run by Oregon State University, the R/V Taani. In 2020, Marinelli announced the college's partnership with the University of Washington and University of Alaska, Fairbanks to form the Cooperative Institute for Climate, Ocean and Ecosystem Studies (CICOES), a $300 million project that will be funded by the National Oceanic and Atmospheric Administration (NOAA).

Marinelli works on the national level to advance scientific research through her involvement with the National Academy of Sciences. She served on the Decadal Ocean Survey committee which prioritized ocean science research topics for the National Science Foundation that was presented in a 2015 publication. In 2017, Marinelli served on the committee that assessed the cost of ice breakers. She also served on the National Academy of Sciences' Committee on the Impacts of Sexual Harassment in Academia, which published the Sexual Harassment of Women report detailing the conditions of sexual harassment occur in science and provided concrete recommendations to overcome these issues.

Marinelli is a member of the board at AltaSea, the port of Los Angeles. Through this venue, she worked to educate the general public about ocean science through a collaboration between AltaSea and Oregon State University, including hosting a 2020 video chat on seafloor ecology through AltaSea's Project Blue program.

== Research ==
Marinelli's research examined the biogeochemistry of the seafloor through quantifying the rate nutrients are retained by sediments and the presence of biota such as clams and worms alter the nutrient conditions in the sediments.

=== Selected publications ===
- Jahnke, Richard A.; Nelson, James R.; Marinelli, Roberta L.; Eckman, James E. (1 January 2000). "Benthic flux of biogenic elements on the Southeastern US continental shelf: influence of pore water advective transport and benthic microalgae". Continental Shelf Research. 20 (1): 109–127. Bibcode:2000CSR....20..109J. doi:10.1016/S0278-4343(99)00063-1. ISSN 0278-4343.
- Marinelli, Roberta L.; Williams, Tracy J. (2003-05-01). "Evidence for density-dependent effects of infauna on sediment biogeochemistry and benthic–pelagic coupling in nearshore systems". Estuarine, Coastal and Shelf Science. 57 (1–2): 179–192. Bibcode:2003ECSS...57..179M. doi:10.1016/S0272-7714(02)00342-6. ISSN 0272-7714.
- Marinelli, Roberta L. (1992-11-01). "Effects of polychaetes on silicate dynamics and fluxes in sediments: Importance of species, animal activity and polychaete effects on benthic diatoms". Journal of Marine Research. 50 (4): 745–779. doi:10.1357/002224092784797566.
- Marinelli, Rl; Lovell, Cr; Wakeham, Sg; Ringelberg, Db; White, Dc (2002). "Experimental investigation of the control of bacterial community composition in macrofaunal burrows". Marine Ecology Progress Series. 235: 1–13. Bibcode:2002MEPS..235....1M. doi:10.3354/meps235001.
