= Mary-Louise Timmermans =

Canadian oceanographer

- Education: University of Cambridge
- Scientific career
- Workplaces: Yale University
- Thesis: Studies in fluid dynamics (2000)

Mary-Louise Elizabeth Timmermans is a marine scientist known for her work on the Arctic Ocean. She is the Damon Wells Professor of Earth and Planetary Sciences at Yale University.

== Education and career ==
Timmermans has a B.S. from the University of Victoria (1994) and an M.S. from the University of Cambridge (1996). In 2000 she earned her Ph.D. from Trinity College, Cambridge where she worked on fluid dynamics. Following her Ph.D. she held a postdoctoral position at the University of Victoria from 2001 until 2002. She then moved to Woods Hole Oceanographic Institution as a postdoctoral scholar and then joined the faculty in 2005. In 2009 she moved to Yale University where she was promoted to professor in 2017 and was named the Damon Wells Professor of Earth and Planetary Sciences in 2020.

== Research ==
Timmermans is known for her research on water masses in the Arctic, particularly how they store heat and freshwater, and move throughout the region. She uses instruments placed in the ocean for extended periods of time to investigate water masses deep in the Canada Basin. The challenges associated with the long-term placement of instruments in the ocean were described in a 2004 article at National Geographic. The resulting data allow her to track the movement of water from the Pacific Ocean into the Arctic Ocean, and has implications for changes in the density layers of the Arctic Ocean and the amount of oxygen stored underneath sea ice. Timmermans' research has found that water in the region is becoming "spicier" which is a change in the balance of how temperature and salinity impacts density. This change means temperature will become more important in determining the density of water masses in the region. Her research has also determined that the amount of heat stored in the Arctic has doubled over the last 30 years which will slow the rate new sea ice is formed in the region. This research was widely covered in the press because the added heat in the region will trigger additional melting of sea ice. These changes in the water temperature are also changing how the Arctic Ocean carries sound, and changing the movement of water in the Arctic Ocean.

== Selected publications ==
- Proshutinsky, Andrey; Krishfield, Richard; Timmermans, Mary-Louise; Toole, John; Carmack, Eddy; McLaughlin, Fiona; Williams, William J.; Zimmermann, Sarah; Itoh, Motoyo; Shimada, Koji (2009). "Beaufort Gyre freshwater reservoir: State and variability from observations". Journal of Geophysical Research: Oceans. 114 (C1). Bibcode:2009JGRC..114.0A10P. doi:10.1029/2008JC005104. hdl:1912/3680. ISSN 2156-2202.
- Toole, J. M.; Timmermans, M.-L.; Perovich, D. K.; Krishfield, R. A.; Proshutinsky, A.; Richter-Menge, J. A. (2010). "Influences of the ocean surface mixed layer and thermohaline stratification on Arctic Sea ice in the central Canada Basin". Journal of Geophysical Research: Oceans. 115 (C10). Bibcode:2010JGRC..11510018T. doi:10.1029/2009JC005660. hdl:1912/4287. ISSN 2156-2202.
- Timmermans, M.-L.; Toole, J.; Krishfield, R.; Winsor, P. (2008). "Ice-Tethered Profiler observations of the double-diffusive staircase in the Canada Basin thermocline". Journal of Geophysical Research: Oceans. 113 (C1). Bibcode:2008JGRC..113.0A02T. doi:10.1029/2008JC004829. hdl:1912/3749. ISSN 2156-2202.
- Timmermans, M.-L.; Toole, J.; Proshutinsky, A.; Krishfield, R.; Plueddemann, A. (2008-01-01). "Eddies in the Canada Basin, Arctic Ocean, Observed from Ice-Tethered Profilers". Journal of Physical Oceanography. 38 (1): 133–145. Bibcode:2008JPO....38..133T. doi:10.1175/2007JPO3782.1. hdl:1912/4041. ISSN 0022-3670.

== Awards and honors ==
Timmermans received a National Science Foundation CAREER award in 2014, and in 2019 received a Presidential Early Career Award for Scientists and Engineers (PECASE). In 2019 Timmermans gave the Sverdrup Award Lecture for the American Geophysical Union. Timmermans has also been awarded for outstanding teaching at Yale University.
