= Rosalind Coggon =

English scientist

Rosalind Mary Coggon
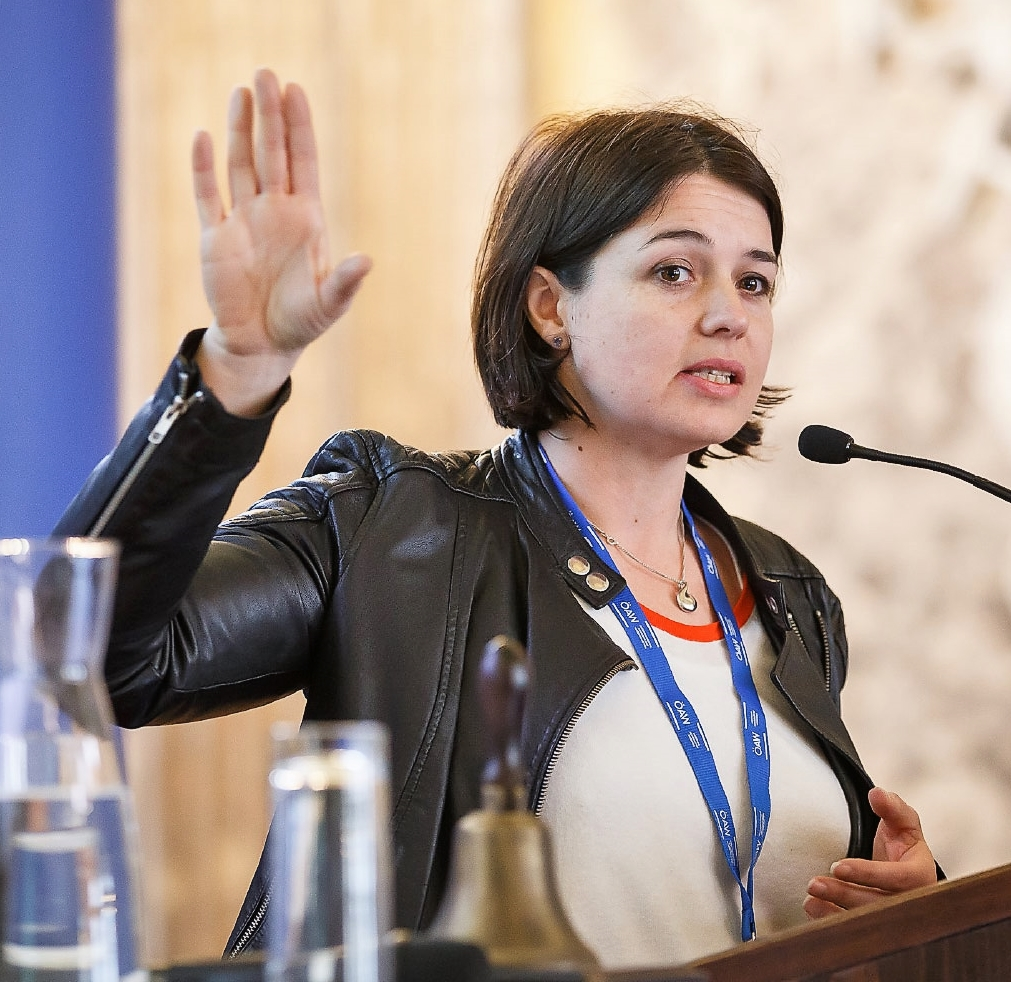
- Coggon receiving 2020 award from the European Consortium for Ocean Research Drilling
- Education: University of Cambridge; University of Southampton
- Scientific career
- Workplaces: Imperial College London; University of Michigan; University of Southampton
- Thesis: Hydrothermal alteration of the ocean crust : insights from the Macquarie Island and drilled in situ ocean crust (2006)

Rosalind Mary Coggon is an English scientist who is a Royal Society University Research Fellow at the University of Southampton. She is the co-editor of the 2050 Science Framework, which guides multidisciplinary subseafloor research. She was awarded the 2021 American Geophysical Union Asahiko Taira International Scientific Ocean Drilling Research Prize.

== Early life and education ==
Coggon was an undergraduate student at the University of Cambridge, where she studied natural sciences. She moved to the University of Southampton as a doctoral researcher in 2001. Her research considered hydrothermal alteration of ocean crust on Macquarie Island. Her doctoral research involved field work on Macquarie as part of the Australian National Antarctic Research Expeditions (ANARE). After graduating she was made a postdoctoral research scientist at the University of Michigan. She returned to the United Kingdom in 2007, where she was appointed a postdoctoral researcher at Imperial College London. By studying the calcium carbonate veins that form in rocks beneath the seafloor, Coggon showed that the chemical composition of oceans varied considerably over geological time.

== Research and career ==
In 2010, Coggon was awarded a Royal Society Dorothy Hodgkin Fellowship and she moved to the University of Southampton. She was made a Royal Society University Research Fellow in 2018. Her research considers the role of fluids in the evolution of the ocean crust, and the quantification of chemical exchanges between the ageing crust and the overlying oceans.

Coggon is co-editor of the International Ocean Discovery Program 2050 Science Framework: Exploring Earth by Scientific Ocean Drilling, which guides multidisciplinary subseafloor research. The framework identifies research frontiers that can only be achieved through ocean drilling. It has a thirty-year outlook and looks to achieve state-of-the-art scientific ocean drilling into the mid-21st century.

Coggon was awarded the Asahiko Taira International Scientific Ocean Drilling Research Prize in 2021. The prize, which honours contributions to scientific ocean drilling, is given in partnership between the American Geophysical Union and Japan Geoscience Union.

== Selected publications ==
- R. Coggon; T. J. B. Holland (September 2002). "Mixing properties of phengitic micas and revised garnet-phengite thermobarometers". Journal of Metamorphic Geology. 20 (7): 683–696. Bibcode:2002JMetG..20..683C. doi:10.1046/j.1525-1314.2002.00395.x. ISSN 0263-4929. Wikidata Q61828880.
- Rosalind M Coggon; Damon A H Teagle; Christopher E Smith-Duque; Jeffrey C Alt; Matthew J Cooper (4 February 2010). "Reconstructing past seawater Mg/Ca and Sr/Ca from mid-ocean ridge flank calcium carbonate veins". Science. 327 (5969): 1114–1117. Bibcode:2010Sci...327.1114C. doi:10.1126/science.1182252. ISSN 0036-8075. PMID 20133522. Wikidata Q43172629.
- Douglas S Wilson; Damon A H Teagle; Jeffrey C Alt; et al. (20 April 2006). "Drilling to gabbro in intact ocean crust". Science. 312 (5776): 1016–1020. Bibcode:2006Sci...312.1016W. doi:10.1126/science.1126090. ISSN 0036-8075. PMID 16627698. Wikidata Q46364794.
