= Monika Rhein =

German physical oceanographer

- Education: University of Heidelberg
- Known for: Physical oceanography, large-scale ocean circulation and role of oceans in climate
- Awards: Albert-Defant-Medal, German Meteorological Society (DMG)
- Scientific career
- Fields: Oceanography
- Workplaces: University of Bremen

Monika Rhein is a physical oceanographer and Professor of Oceanography at University of Bremen. Rhein has led the authorship of over 29 peer reviewed publications, and is an author of over 100 peer reviewed publications. Rhein has broad ranging interests across oceanography, specialising in understanding the water masses in the oceans and their circulation, ocean mixing and the role of oceans in climate. Rhein's expertise has led to her authoring chapters of the "Technical Summary" and "Summary for Policymakers" of the 5th International Panel of Climate Change (IPCC) report and acting as president of the Ocean Science Division of the European Geoscience Union.

== Career ==
Rhein was awarded a PhD degree in physics from the University of Heidelberg in 1986.

Rhein worked as a research scientist at the University of Heidelberg and GKSS Hamburg between 1986–1988, before joining the faculty at the Institute for Marine Sciences Kiel. Between 1988 – 1994, Rhein was an assistant professor, before earning their habilitation in 1994, and becoming an associate professor. In 1998, Rhein became a professor at University of Rostock, and in 2000, moved to the Universität Bremen as professor and leader of the Department of Oceanography.

Between 2005 and 2009, Rhein was president of the Ocean Science Division of the European Geoscience Union.

Between 2011 and 2014, Rhein was a lead author of the "Technical Summary" and "Summary for Policymakers" of the 5th International Panel of Climate Change (IPCC) report, Working Group 1.

Rhein is a member of the International Project Oversight Committee for the Overturning in the Subpolar North Atlantic Program.

== Awards ==
In 2016, Rhein was awarded the Albert-Defant-Medal by the German Meteorological Society (DMG), which she shared with Jürgen Sündermann, a retired professor of Universität Hamburg.
