= Fiona McLaughlin =

Canadian oceanographer

Fiona Ann McLaughlin
- Education: University of Victoria
- Scientific career
- Workplaces: Institute of Ocean Sciences
- Thesis: The Canada basin, 1989-1995 : upstream events and far-field effects of the Barents Sea branch (2000)

Fiona McLaughlin is a senior Oceanographer, employed by Canada's Department of Fisheries and Oceans. McLaughlin joined government service in 1972. Since 1994 she has concentrated on the ecology of the Arctic Ocean.

== Education and career ==
McLauglin earned an M.Sc. from the University of Victoria in 1996 with a thesis titled "Geochemical and physical water mass properties and halocarbon ventilation in the Southern Canadian Basin of the Arctic Ocean". In 2000, she finished her Ph.D. from the University of Victoria.

McLaughlin has an extensive list of publications.

McLaughlin has made field trips on the icebreakers of the Canadian Coast Guard. In November 2009 she was one of the authors of an article in Science about the acidification of the Arctic Ocean that reported that the Beaufort Sea was close to the point where the carbonate shells of plankton would begin to dissolve.

== Publications ==
Articles

- Itoh, Motoyo; Carmack, Eddy; Shimada, Koji; McLaughlin, Fiona; Nishino, Shigeto; Zimmermann, Sarah (2007). "Formation and spreading of Eurasian source oxygen-rich halocline water into the Canadian Basin in the Arctic Ocean". Geophysical Research Letters. 34 (8). L08603: [Washington] American Geophysical Union: L08603. Bibcode:2007GeoRL..34.8603I. doi:10.1029/2007GL029482. ISSN 0094-8276.
- Shimada, K; McLaughlin, F; Carmack, E; Proshutinsky, A (2004). "Penetration of the 1990s warm temperature anomaly of Atlantic Water in the Canada Basin". Geophysical Research Letters. 31 (20). L20301: L20301. Bibcode:2004GeoRL..3120301S. doi:10.1029/2004GL020860. hdl:1912/3312. ISSN 0094-8276. S2CID 67755133.

Cruise reports

- Zimmermann, Sarah; McLaughlin, Fiona (2006). "Joint Ocean Ice Study (JOIS) 2006: Cruise Report" (PDF). WHOI. Archived from the original (PDF) on 2011-04-01.
- Zimmermann, Sarah; McLaughlin, Fiona (2004). "2004 Joint Western Arctic Circulation Study and Beaufort Gyre Freshwater Experiment; Cruise Report" (PDF). WHOI. Archived from the original (PDF) on 2011-04-01.
