= Lisan Yu =

Senior scientist at the Woods Hole Oceanographic Institution

Lisan Yu is an oceanographer, and a senior scientist at the Woods Hole Oceanographic Institution. She serves on the Earth Science Advisory Committee (ESAC), a new Federal Advisory Committee Act (FACA) committee of NASA.

She received a B.S. in meteorology from the Shandong College of Oceanography. She holds an M.S. and Ph.D. in physical oceanography from Florida State University,

In 2020, Yu was one of the researchers at the Woods Hole Oceanographic Institution who received a $500,000 grant from the National Oceanic and Atmospheric Administration's (NOAA) Climate Observations and Monitoring program to develop a machine learning framework to improve estimates of air-sea heat exchange in the Arctic Ocean. Yu's research involves analysing data collected by a Saildrone fleet from a 2019 Arctic mission.

Yu has authored over 100 academic publications, which have been cited over 7,800 times, resulting in an h-index and i10-index of 37 and 65 respectively. Yu was one of 1,371 peer-reviewers for the JGR-Oceans journal during 2021.

== Selected Academic Publications ==
- Objectively analyzed air–sea heat fluxes for the global ice-free oceans (1981–2005). Lisan Yu and Robert A Weller. Bulletin of the American Meteorological Society. 2007.
- Multidecade Global Flux Datasets from the Objectively Analyzed Air-sea Fluxes (OAFlux) Project: Latent and Sensible Heat Fluxes, Ocean Evaporation, and Related Surface Meteorological Variables. Lisan Yu, Xiangze Jin, and Robert A. Weller. 2008.
- Oceanic and terrestrial sources of continental precipitation. Luis Gimeno, Andreas Stohl, Ricardo M Trigo, Francina Dominguez, Kei Yoshimura, Lisan Yu, Anita Drumond, Ana María Durán‐Quesada, Raquel Nieto. Reviews of Geophysics. 2012.
- Surface irradiances consistent with CERES-derived top-of-atmosphere shortwave and longwave irradiances. Seiji Kato, Norman G Loeb, Fred G Rose, David R Doelling, David A Rutan, Thomas E Caldwell, Lisan Yu, Robert A Weller. Journal of Climate. 2013.
