= Doron Nof =

American oceanographer (1944–2022)

Doron Nof (May 1, 1944 - August 1, 2022) was an American oceanographer. He was the Distinguished Nansen Professor of Physical Oceanography at Florida State University.

Nof published on various aspects of physical oceanography, including flows through straits and passages, boundary current dynamics, upwelling in coastal regions, the dynamics of eddies in the upper and deep ocean, equatorial dynamics, general circulation problems, and cross-equatorial flows. He was a recipient of the Fridtjof Nansen Medal awarded by the European Geosciences Union. In addition to his scientific research, Nof received notoriety in the popular press for using physical oceanography to explain Biblical and other historical phenomena, such as the parting of the Red Sea and walking on water.
