= Sydney Oskar Wigen =

Canadian oceanographer

Sydney Oscar Wigen (June 28, 1923 - August 20, 2000) was a distinguished Canadian oceanographer who served with the Canadian Hydrographic Service from 1945 to 1985.

Wigen had served as head of the Tide and Current Survey for the Pacific coast and western Arctic. His work in the field of tsunami research from 1960 to 1985 helped establish current standards for tsunami data measurement.

From 1975 to 1977, he was the first Associate Director of the UNESCO Intergovernmental Oceanographic Commission's International Tsunami Information Center(ITIC) in Honolulu, Hawaii. During his tenure at UNESCO, he expanded active participation and information sharing among Pacific Ocean countries with the Pacific Tsunami Warning Center.
