= Heidi Sosik =

American biologist, oceanographer

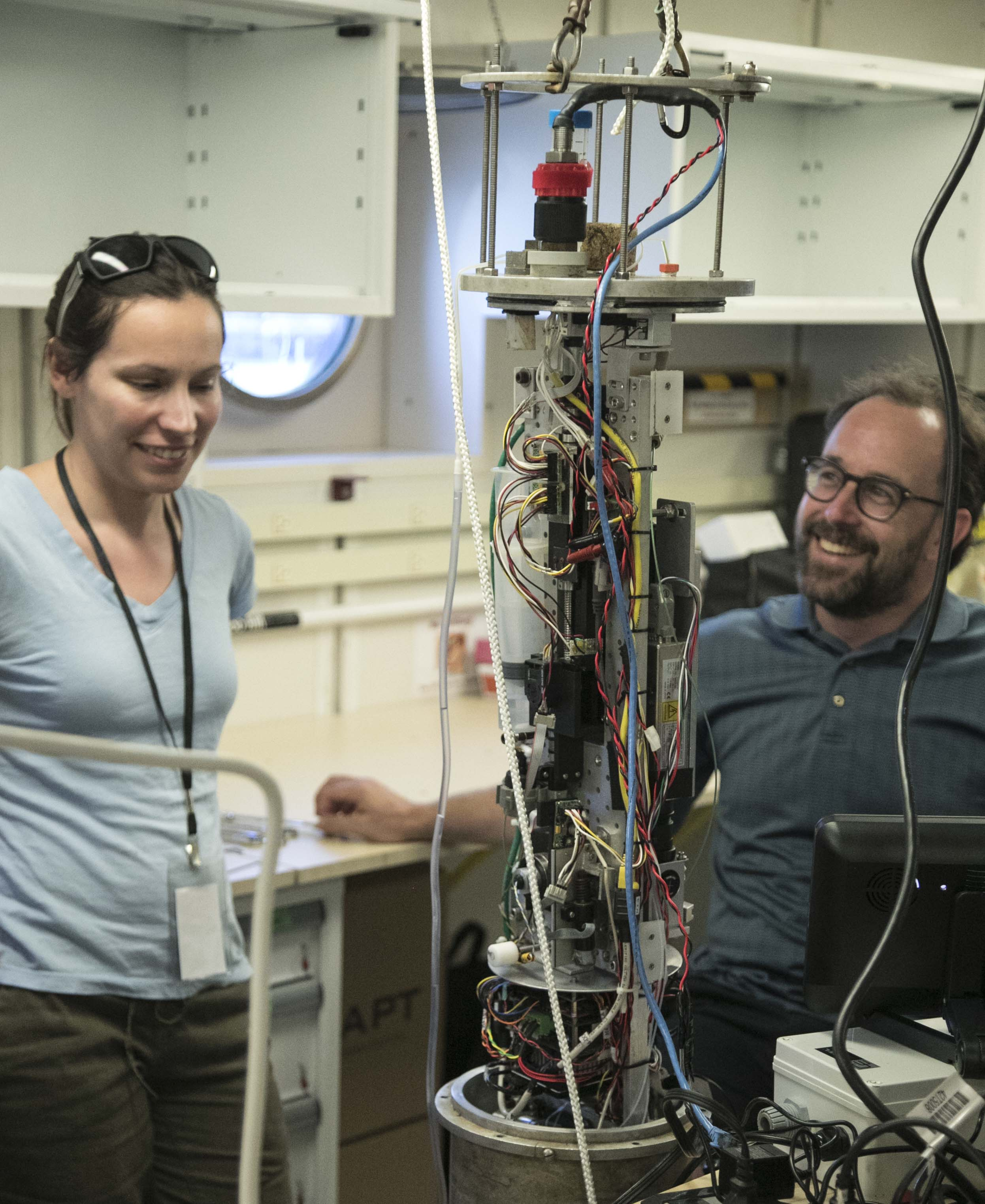
An Imaging Flow Cytobot.

Heidi Sosik is an American biologist, oceanographer, and inventor based at the Woods Hole Oceanographic Institution.

== Career ==
She is a senior scientist in the Stanley W. Watson Chair for Excellence in Oceanography; Director of WHOI's Center for Ocean, Marine, and Seafloor Observing Systems; Chief Scientist of the Martha's Vineyard Coastal Observatory (MVCO); and lead scientist for the Northeast United States Shelf Long Term Ecological Research program. She is the co-creator of the Imaging FlowCytobot, an automated underwater microscope that has been used to study microscopic (10-150 micron in size) ocean life over time and to prevent shellfish poisoning. Her inventions and research in phytoplankton ecology has revolutionized the ability to track changes in phytoplankton community composition over time, including at the MVCO time series site, as part of the Northeast United States Shelf Long Term Ecological Research program and through research labs that utilize the commercially available Imaging FlowCytobot and expertise provided by the Woods Hole Oceanographic Institution Plankton Wiki page.

== Research ==
Sosik's research broadly focuses on phytoplankton ecology, including observations that help explain controls on phytoplankton community composition, distribution of phytoplankton in the ocean and productivity of this portion of the marine food web. Her work focuses on observing natural systems, but utilizes engineering, mathematics, modeling and theory to resolve questions spanning single cells to regional scale patterns that can be observed from ocean color satellite sensors.

== Education ==
Sosik completed her undergraduate (1987) and masters (1988) degrees in civil engineering at MIT and her doctorate (1993) in oceanography from Scripps Institution of Oceanography (UC San Diego).

== Recognition ==
Sosik received the Presidential Early Career Award for Scientists and Engineers, and was part of a team that received a 35 million dollar grant from The Audacious Project for their research into the ocean’s twilight zone. She was named a 2018 Fellow of The Oceanography Society and the Rachel Carson Lecturer for the 2019 American Geophysical Union Honors Program.
