= Wiesław Masłowski =

- Education: University of Gdansk, University of Alaska, Fairbanks
- Scientific career
- Fields: Oceanography
- Workplaces: Naval Postgraduate School
- Thesis: Numerical modeling study of the circulation of the Greenland Sea (1994)

Wiesław Masłowski is a research professor at the Naval Postgraduate School in Monterey, California since 2009. He obtained his MS from the University of Gdańsk in 1987, and his PhD from the University of Alaska, Fairbanks in 1994, with a dissertation entitled Numerical modeling study of the circulation of the Greenland Sea. He became well known in 2007 for stating that the Arctic Ocean might be nearly ice free in the summer as early as 2013, based on projection of the declining ice volume trend. While later revised to 2016 +/- 3 years based on computer modeling, this prediction became controversial when the Arctic was not sea-ice free in 2013, having increased from the record low set in 2012. As of May 2021, the Arctic has not been sea-ice free. Mr Maslowski has not revised his prediction of 2016 +/-3 years.
