= Philip Froelich =

American academic oceanographic scientist

Dr. Philip 'Flip' Nissen Froelich, Jr. is an American academic oceanographic scientist, whose research uses biogeochemistry dynamics to address human impacts on the world's oceans.

== Early life and career ==
Froelich graduated from Duke University in 1968. He obtained a Ph.D. from the University of Rhode Island in 1979.

He is a Francis Eppes Professor of Oceanography at Florida State University, where he is involved in the interdisciplinary Biogeochemical Dynamics Program. He is also affiliated with the National High Magnetic Field Laboratory.
