= Jennifer Mackinnon =

American physical oceanographer

- Born: Jennifer Ann Mackinnon; September 16, 1973 (age 53)

Academic background
- Education: Swarthmore College; University of Washington
- Thesis: Coastal Recipes: Internal waves, turbulence and mixing on the New England continental shelf. (2002)
- Doctoral advisor: Michael Gregg

Academic work
- Discipline: Oceanography
- Sub-discipline: Physical Oceanography
- Institutions: Scripps Institution of Oceanography
- Main interests: Physical Oceanography; Internal Waves and Ocean Mixing; Coastal Oceanography; Sub-mesoscale instabilities; Ocean-Atmosphere Interactions; Applied Ocean Sciences

Jennifer Ann Mackinnon (born September 16, 1973) is an American physical oceanographer who has studied small-scale dynamical processes in oceans for more than 20 years. These processes include internal waves and ocean mixing, turbulence, sub-mesoscale instabilities, and their complex interaction. She is a professor at the Scripps Institution of Oceanography (SIO) of the University of California, San Diego. Her research requires extensive fieldwork at sea to observe these processes.

== Early life and education ==
Mackinnon graduated with a Bachelor of Arts (Major in Physics) with distinction from Swarthmore College in June 1995. In June 1999, she completed a Master of Science at the Department of Oceanography of the University of Washington. She then carried out a PhD in the same department that she defended in June 2002.

== Career and research ==
After some postdoctoral research at SIO from October 2002 to December 2003, she was secured an assistant research faculty position before being appointed associate professor and professor. In 2019, she was appointed Associate Dean for Faculty Equity at Scripps Institution for Oceanography

In 2021, she demonstrated with coworkers in a publication in Nature Communications that pockets of warm water from the Pacific Ocean are accelerating the melting of sea ice

== Awards and recognition ==
- 1991 – National Merit Finalist
- 1999 – Geophysical Fluid Dynamics Fellowship at the Woods Hole Oceanographic Institution
- 1997 – 2000 – National Defense Science and Engineering Graduate (NDSEG) Fellowship
- 2011 – Scripps Graduate Teaching Award
- 2014 – the AMS Nicholas Fofonoff Award for "outstanding contributions to the understanding of internal mixing in the ocean, artfully synthesizing observations, theory, and numerical modeling."
- 2018 – UC San Diego Inclusive Excellence Award
