= Richard W. Johnson (oceanographer) =

American oceanographer

Richard W. Johnson (1929 in El Cajon, California – January 11, 2016) was an American oceanographer.

He worked at Scripps Institution of Oceanography in San Diego, California for over 50 years, beginning in 1956. He was a Principal Development Engineer at Scripps Institution of Oceanography Visibility Lab and Marine Physical Lab. In this position, he was the head of MPL's Atmospheric Optics Group, as well as the PI for the group for many years.

He was born in 1929 in El Cajon, California. He served in the Army during the Korean War, from 1950 to 1954, working on an island in the Aleutian Chain to open up an airstrip. Soon after his release, he joined SIO's Visibility Lab in 1956 as a young engineer. He worked in the Atmospheric Optics Group (AOG), helping acquire airborne radiometric measurements in areas as far reached as Australia (in support of NASA’s Gemini program) and Thailand. He became head of the AOG in 1972, serving as PI on many projects, and was also named Asst. Director of the Visibility Lab. His favorite project involved an instrumented C-130 aircraft, on which our group mounted radiometric and meteorological instrumentation mostly developed at the Vis Lab. He managed and flew deployments all over the US and in several European countries.

When the Visibility Lab closed in the mid-1980s, the AOG joined SIO’s Marine Physical Laboratory (MPL), where he continued leading the AOG. This was about the time that he developed the concept of the first digital Whole Sky Imager, which eventually was able to measure and detect cloud distributions day and night. He retired in 1991, but continued working part-time for several years and then volunteered with the group until 2012. During this time he developed a concept for a zooming fisheye capability, which was patented by University of California San Diego.

== Selected publications ==
- Johnson, Richard W. "Daytime visibility and nephelometer measurements related to its determination." Atmospheric Environment 15.10 (1981): 1835–1845.
- Johnson, Richard W., Wayne S. Hering, and Janet E. Shields. Automated Visibility & Cloud Cover Measurements with a Solid State Imaging System. No. MPL-U-26/89. SCRIPPS INSTITUTION OF OCEANOGRAPHY SAN DIEGO CA MARINE PHYSICAL LAB, 1989.
- Duntley, Seibert Q., Richard W. Johnson, and Jacqueline I. Gordon. "Airborne measurements of optical atmospheric properties, summary and review, 2." Final Report, 1 Sep. 1972-31 Jul. 1975 Scripps Institution of Oceanography, San Diego, CA. Visibility Lab. 1 (1975).
- Duntley, Seibert Q., Richard W. Johnson, and Jacqueline I. Gordon. "Airborne measurements of atmospheric volume scattering coefficients in northern Europe, fall 1976." Interim Report Scripps Institution of Oceanography, San Diego, CA. Visibility Lab. 1 (1978).
