= Robert R. L. Guillard =

Mult-disciplinary scientist (1921–2016)

Robert R. L. Guillard (February 5, 1921 - September 25, 2016) was a scientist that contributed to the fields of aquaculture, oceanography, and phycology, particularly the phytoplankton. He earned his Ph.D. from Yale University. In 1958, he joined Woods Hole Oceanographic Institution as an associated scientist and later a senior scientist. In 1982, he moved to Bigelow Laboratory for Ocean Sciences where he helped establish the Provasoli-Guillard National Center for Culture of Marine Phytoplankton (CCMP). He developed the algal culture medium, f/2, which is now commonly used for laboratory studies of marine algae.
