= Paola Malanotte Rizzoli =

Physical oceanographer

- Education: Scripps Institution of Oceanography; University of Padua
- Scientific career
- Workplaces: Massachusetts Institute of Technology

Paola Malanotte Rizzoli is an Italian physical oceanographer known for her research on ocean circulation and sea level rise, especially with respect to flooding conditions in Venice.

== Education and career ==
As a child growing up in Venice, Malanotte Rizzoli had a passion for music and by age eleven learned La Traviata while considering a future as an opera singer. However, math prevailed and she earned a B.S. in physics and mathematics from Lyceum “Benedetti” Italy. In 1968 she completed a Ph.D. at the University of Padua with a dissertation titled “Quantum-mechanical structure of biologically important molecules. Investigation of the complex molecules of nucleic acids”. She spent one year as a postdoctoral fellow in Padua and then joined a study initiated by the Italian National Research Council to look at the issues surrounding Venice and the surrounding lagoon. Starting in 1971 she traveled between Scripps Institution of Oceanography and Venice working on oceanographic studies of Venice. Starting in 1972, she was also a research associate at Istituto Studio Dinamica Grande Masse (Institute for the Study of Great Masses), where she received tenure in 1976 and remained until 1981. In 1978 she completed a second Ph.D. at Scripps Institution of Oceanography with a dissertation titled “Solitary Rossby Waves Over Variable Relief and Their Stability Properties”. At the time, she was the only woman in the physical oceanography department. She remained at Scripps as a Cecil and Ida Green scholar from 1978 until 1980 at which point she moved to the Massachusetts Institute of Technology (MIT), and again was the only woman in physical oceanography. In 1987, Malanotte Rizzoli became the first woman in MIT's Earth, Atmospheric, and Planetary Sciences department to earn tenure. In 1994, Malanotte Rizzoli was one of 16 women faculty in the School of Science at MIT who drafted and co-signed a letter to the then-Dean of Science (now Chancellor of Berkeley) Robert Birgeneau, which started a campaign to highlight and challenge gender discrimination at MIT.

From 1997 until 2009, Malanotte Rizzoli led the MIT component of the MIT/Woods Hole Oceanographic Institution Joint Program in Oceanography and Applied Ocean Science and Engineering, and has been the main advisor for 22 students in the program.

== Research ==
Malanotte Rizzoli has worked in multiple research topics, which she describes as her “renewal time” of 5–7 years. In 1982 she started a program focusing on the physical oceanography of the eastern Mediterranean, the POEM project, where she led research into the circulation of water in the region. As increasing amounts of data become available for oceanographic research, she has expanded her use of data assimilation, with a focus on its applications to oceanographic questions. Geographically, she has considered the formation of the rings of the Gulf Stream In the Atlantic Ocean and she has also worked on the exchange of heat, water, and salt in tropical oceans. In the early 2000s, Malanotte Rizzoli began work on climate science through a project that led to the development of a coupled ocean-atmosphere model in Southeast Asia where the Indonesian Throughflow allows passage of water from the Pacific to the Indian Ocean. She was one of the contributing authors on the 2007 chapter on "Observations: Oceanic Climate Change and Sea Level" which was published by the Intergovernmental Panel on Climate Change.

Climate science, with its daunting complexity, is arguably the greatest challenge presently facing not only oceanography but the earth sciences in general

— Paola Malanotte Rizzoli,

Malanotte Rizzoli grew up in Venice and remembers the 1966 Venice flood and in 2017 she considered how her connections to Venice influenced her career arc. The storm surge in Venice, the Acqua alta, has been the focus of her work and from 1995 until 2013, she was a consultant for Consorzio Venezia Nuova, the group tasked with the building the barriers designed to block the flow of water into the Venetian lagoon, the MOdulo Sperimentale Elettromeccanico (MOSE) project. In 2021, Malanotte-Rizzoli created an exhibit on the resilience of Venice with Laura Fregolent for the 17th International Venice Biennale of Architecture.

=== Selected publications ===
- Ghil, Michael; Malanotte-Rizzoli, Paola (1 January 1991). "Data Assimilation in Meteorology and Oceanography". Advances in Geophysics. 33: 141–266. Bibcode:1991AdGeo..33..141G. doi:10.1016/S0065-2687(08)60442-2. ISBN 9780120188338. ISSN 0065-2687.
- Malanotte-Rizzoli, Paola; Manca, Beniamino B; Ribera d'Alcala, Maurizio; Theocharis, Alexander; Brenner, Stephen; Budillon, Giorgio; Ozsoy, Emin (1 July 1999). "The Eastern Mediterranean in the 80s and in the 90s: the big transition in the intermediate and deep circulations". Dynamics of Atmospheres and Oceans. 29 (2–4): 365–395. Bibcode:1999DyAtO..29..365M. doi:10.1016/S0377-0265(99)00011-1. hdl:11511/68389. ISSN 0377-0265.
- Malanotte-Rizzoli, Paola; Manca, Beniamino B.; D'Alcalà, Maurizio Ribera; Theocharis, Alexander; Bergamasco, Andrea; Bregant, Davide; Budillon, Giorgio; Civitarese, Giuseppe; Georgopoulos, Dimitris; Michelato, Antonio; Sansone, Emilio; Scarazzato, Paolo; Souvermezoglou, Ekaterini (January 1997). "A synthesis of the Ionian Sea hydrography, circulation and water mass pathways during POEM-Phase I". Progress in Oceanography. 39 (3): 153–204. Bibcode:1997PrOce..39..153M. doi:10.1016/S0079-6611(97)00013-X.
- Malanotte-Rizzoli, Paola (2017-01-03). "Venice and I: How a City Can Determine the Fate of a Career". Annual Review of Marine Science. 9 (1): 1–29. Bibcode:2017ARMS....9....1M. doi:10.1146/annurev-marine-010816-060632. ISSN 1941-1405. PMID 27575741.
- Urban, Edward R.; Sundby, Bjorn; Malanotte-Rizzoli, Paola; Melillo, Jerry M. (2009). Watersheds, bays, and bounded seas : the science and management of semi-enclosed marine systems. Washington: Island Press. ISBN 9781597265034.

== Awards and honors ==
- Masi Prize, Masi Foundation (1998)
- Fellow, American Meteorological Society (2002)
- Fellow, American Geophysical Union (2006)
- Rachel Carson lecture, American Geophysical Union (2017)
- Enrico Marchi lecture, University of Catania (2018)

== Personal life ==
Malanotte-Rizzoli is married to Peter Stone who is also a professor at Massachusetts Institute of Technology. In 2021 they endowed the Peter H. Stone and Paola Malanotte Stone chair whose first recipient is Arlene Fiore.
