= Janet Sprintall =

Australian oceanographer

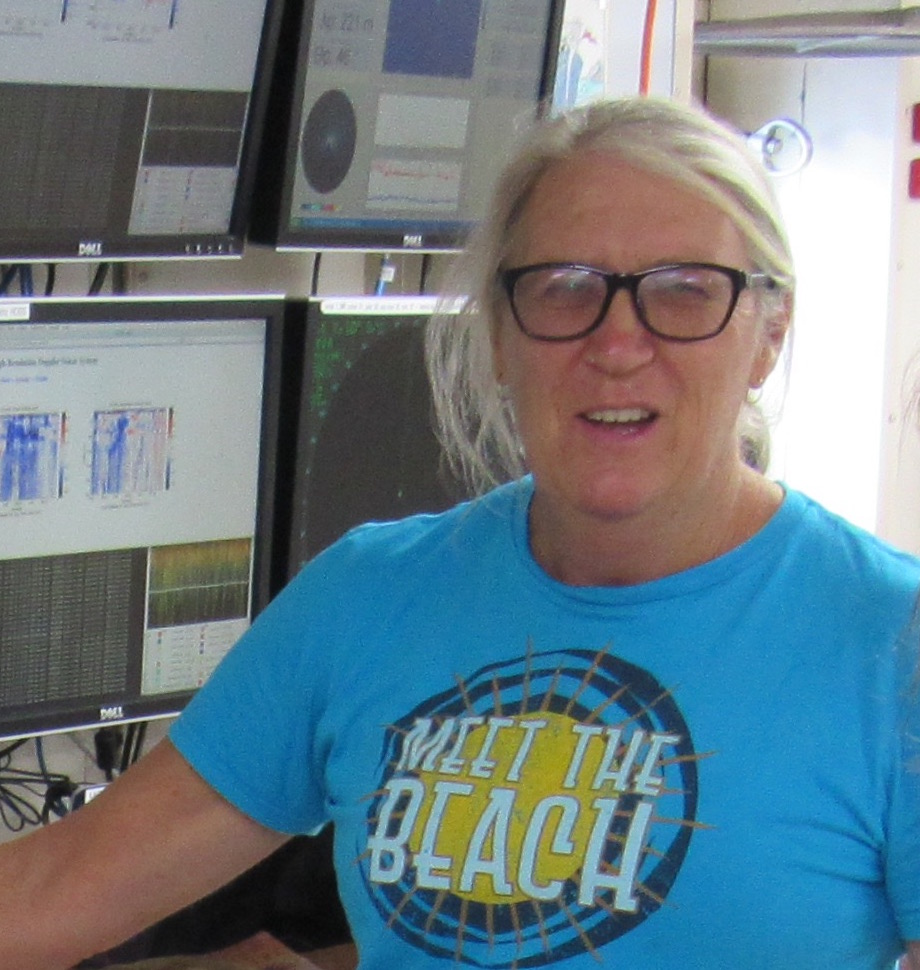
Janet Sprintall at sea

Janet Sprintall is an Australian-born oceanographer at Scripps Institution of Oceanography. She specializes in inter-basin exchanges, and in particular in the Indonesian throughflow and dynamics of the Antarctic Circumpolar Current through the Drake Passage. Sprintall studied barrier layers for her doctoral research, and as of 2016 is building on that work as a principal investigator with the NASA SPURS II project in the tropical Pacific. As an expert in Pacific Ocean dynamics, she has been highly cited. Sprintall provided plot advice for the TV series Lost.
