= Brenda Konar =

Marine scientist

Brenda Konar is a marine scientist, and professor at University of Alaska Fairbanks.

== Education ==
In 1991 Konar earned a master's degree from San Jose State University where she worked on Coralline algae. In 1998 Konar earned her Ph.D. from the University of California, Santa Cruz where she worked on benthic communities in the Semichi Islands.

In 2021, she was named Project Director of the "Fire & Ice" research project.

== Research ==
She studies the die-off in sea stars. She studies the decline in sea otterss, boom in sea urchins, and loss of Clathromorphum nereostratum, limestone reefs. She helped discover a new habitat of rhodolith.

== Selected publications ==
- Konar, Brenda; Estes, James A. (2003). "The Stability of Boundary Regions Between Kelp Beds and Deforested Areas". Ecology. 84 (1): 174–185. doi:10.1890/0012-9658(2003)084[0174:TSOBRB]2.0.CO;2. ISSN 0012-9658.
- Edwards, Matthew; Konar, Brenda; Kim, Ju-Hyoung; Gabara, Scott; Sullaway, Genoa; McHugh, Tristin; Spector, Michael; Small, Sadie (2020-03-04). "Marine deforestation leads to widespread loss of ecosystem function". PLOS ONE. 15 (3) e0226173. Bibcode:2020PLoSO..1526173E. doi:10.1371/journal.pone.0226173. ISSN 1932-6203. PMC 7055868. PMID 32130220.
- Ulaski, Brian P.; Konar, Brenda; Otis, Edward O. (2020-12-01). "Seaweed Reproduction and Harvest Rebound in Southcentral Alaska: Implications for Wild Stock Management". Estuaries and Coasts. 43 (8): 2046–2062. Bibcode:2020EstCo..43.2046U. doi:10.1007/s12237-020-00740-1. ISSN 1559-2731. S2CID 218604998.
- Bland, Aaron; Konar, Brenda; Edwards, Matthew (2019-03-01). "Spatial trends and environmental drivers of epibenthic shelf community structure across the Aleutian Islands". Continental Shelf Research. 175: 12–29. Bibcode:2019CSR...175...12B. doi:10.1016/j.csr.2019.01.006. ISSN 0278-4343. S2CID 133874643.
- Metzger, Jacob R.; Konar, Brenda; Edwards, Matthew S. (2019-11-11). "Assessing a macroalgal foundation species: community variation with shifting algal assemblages". Marine Biology. 166 (12): 156. Bibcode:2019MarBi.166..156M. doi:10.1007/s00227-019-3606-1. hdl:11122/9690. ISSN 1432-1793. S2CID 209604008.
