= Björn Kjerfve =

Swedish-American oceanographer

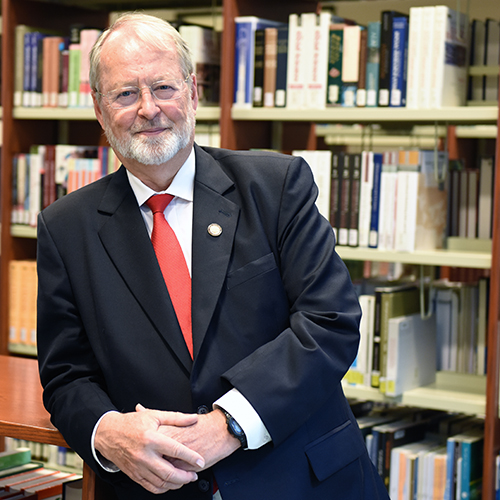
- Dr. Björn Kjerfve Chancellor of American University of Sharjah

Björn Kjerfve is a Swedish-American oceanographer. Kjerfve's expertise is in coastal and estuarine physical oceanography. He has served at the University of South Carolina, Texas A&M University, and the American University of Sharjah.

Kjerfve's publications are collected by libraries worldwide. He has published 12 books and more than 250 scientific journal papers, book chapters, and reports.

In 2013, the Brazilian Academy of Sciences elected Kjerfve as a corresponding member.

== Early life and education ==
Kjerfve was born and raised in Skövde, Sweden. He won a one-year Rotary Scholarship to study at Georgia Southern College, remaining there by paying his way on a tennis scholarship, and graduating with a bachelor of arts in mathematics. He continued his studies at the University of Washington in Seattle, earning a master of science degree in oceanography. He went on to earn a Ph.D. in marine sciences from Louisiana State University.

== Career ==
Kjerfve served as president of the World Maritime University in Malmo, Sweden, for five years, before becoming the chancellor of American University of Sharjah (AUS), in 2014.

He had previously served as a tenured professor of oceanography and dean of the College of Geosciences (2004–2009) at Texas A&M University. As dean, he oversaw four academic departments, the Texas Sea Grant Program, and the Integrated Ocean Drilling Program (IODP), which operates the D/V Joides Resolution, the 475-foot IODP ocean sciences drilling vessel.

Kjerfve was the director of the Marine Science Program (2000–2004) at the University of South Carolina, where he had earlier served as a professor of marine and geological sciences, following the successful defense of his Ph.D.

== Personal ==
Kjerfve holds dual citizenship (US and Sweden) and is a permanent resident of Brazil, with a current UAE residence/work visa. He has three daughters, and is fluent in English, Swedish, and Portuguese.
