= Karin Bryan =

New Zealand oceanography academic

Karin Roisin Bryan FRSNZ
- Education: Dalhousie University
- Scientific career
- Workplaces: University of Waikato
- Thesis: Bar-trapped edge waves. (1997)

Karin Roisin Bryan FRSNZ is a New Zealand oceanography academic, and as of 2019 is a full professor at the University of Waikato. She is also the director of the Environmental Research Institute.

== Academic career ==
After a 1997 PhD titled Bar-trapped edge waves at Dalhousie University, Bryan moved to the University of Waikato, rising to full professor.

Much of Bryan's work is related to human-used beaches.

In 2022, Bryan was elected a Fellow of the Royal Society of New Zealand.

== Selected works ==
- Emami, A., Bryan, K., & De Lange, W. (2019). Spatial patterns in groundwater seepage and surf zone morphology: Muriwai Beach, New Zealand. Journal of Coastal Research: an international forum for the littoral sciences, 35(1), 186–195. doi:10.2112/JCOASTRES-D-17-00180
- Cussioli, M. C., Bryan, K. R., Pilditch, C. A., de Lange, W. P., & Bischof, K. (2019). Light penetration in a temperate meso-tidal lagoon: Implications for seagrass growth and dredging in Tauranga Harbour, New Zealand. Ocean and Coastal Management, 174, 25–37. doi:10.1016/j.ocecoaman.2019.01.014
- Gorman, Richard M., Karin R. Bryan, and Andrew K. Laing. "Wave hindcast for the New Zealand region: nearshore validation and coastal wave climate." New Zealand Journal of Marine and Freshwater Research 37, no. 3 (2003): 567–588.
- Barnard, Patrick L., Andrew D. Short, Mitchell D. Harley, Kristen D. Splinter, Sean Vitousek, Ian L. Turner, Jonathan Allan et al. "Coastal vulnerability across the Pacific dominated by El Niño/Southern Oscillation." Nature Geoscience 8, no. 10 (2015): 801.
- Senechal, Nadia, Giovanni Coco, Karin R. Bryan, and Rob A. Holman. "Wave runup during extreme storm conditions." Journal of Geophysical Research: Oceans 116, no. C7 (2011).
- Coco, Giovanni, Nadia Senechal, A. Rejas, Karin R. Bryan, S. Capo, J. P. Parisot, Jenna A. Brown, and Jamie HM MacMahan. "Beach response to a sequence of extreme storms." Geomorphology 204 (2014): 493–501.
- Gorman, Richard M., Karin R. Bryan, and Andrew K. Laing. "Wave hindcast for the New Zealand region: deep‐water wave climate." New Zealand Journal of Marine and Freshwater Research 37, no. 3 (2003): 589–612.
