= Paula Bontempi =

American oceanographer

Paula Susan Bontempi
- Education: Boston College, Texas A&M, University of Rhode Island
- Scientific career
- Workplaces: NASA, University of Rhode Island
- Thesis: Remote sensing of bio -optical water types, phytoplankton seasonality, and algal pigments in ocean margin waters (2001)
- Doctoral advisor: James Yoder

Paula Susan Bontempi is an oceanographer who has led the use of satellites in marine science during her positions in NASA and as the dean of the Graduate School of Oceanography at the University of Rhode Island.

== Research and career ==
Bontempi's Ph.D. analyzed imagery from the SeaWIFS satellite to characterize spatial variability in chlorophyll as observed from space and was the first research to reveal a spring phytoplankton bloom off the southeastern continental United States. Following time at the University of Southern Mississippi, Bontempi moved on to Ocean Biology and Biogeochemistry at NASA Headquarters. During time at NASA, Bontempi led a research portfolio of projects in carbon cycle science, in both terrestrial and aquatic systems, and worked to diversify the community at NASA. In 2010, Bontempi served on the Committee of Visitors that advised the National Science Foundation's Ocean Sciences Division on the logistics associated with how proposals are handled through the review process at NSF. During time at NASA, Bontempi facilitated the funding of ideas and projects proposed by scientists to NASA including the Plankton, Aerosol, Cloud, ocean Ecosystem (PACE) mission which will provide oceanographic and atmospheric data that allows scientists to investigate how the Earth is responding to a changing climate and as such is a key aspect of NASA science activities this decade. In preparation for the PACE mission, Bontempi presented the use of LIDAR from an airplane as a model for how data from the PACE mission would be handled. Bontempi was the NASA program scientist for the NASA- and National Science Foundation funded EXport Processes in the Ocean from RemoTe Sensing (EXPORTS) program, a venture that involves multiple research cruises, over 100 scientists, and almost 30 research institutions. In 2020, Bontempi became the dean of the Graduate School of Oceanography at the University of Rhode Island.

Bontempi was named a fellow of The Oceanography Society in 2019

For her vision of what satellite-based ocean ecology could be, and tireless efforts to bring that vision to fruition in partnership with the community and space agencies

— The Oceanography Society

Bontempi participates in both national and international activities to advance understanding of the global carbon cycle. Bontempi was the co-chair of the US Carbon Cycle Interagency Working Group Science Program from 2008 to 2012, and concluded time at NASA as acting deputy director at NASA's Earth Science Division, Science Mission Directorate of NASA Headquarters in Washington, DC. In 2020, Bontempi advocated for breaking down barriers between departments in the federal funding of earth science during a workshop hosted by the National Academy.

Bontempi actively participates in educating the general public about climate change and science using multiple venues including interviews from popular magazines such as Marie Claire, audio interviews with the StoryCorps project and Audible, and a TED talk in April 2021. Bontempi spoke at the Center for Strategic and International Studies in a 2019 forum on climate change and maritime security and has testified before the US House of Representatives on March 12, 2021 in a presentation to the Committee on Science, Space, and Technology. Sophia Academy included Bontempi in their 2021 Women of Wisdom celebration when they take the time to "elevate, appreciate, and celebrate the Women of Wisdom". In May 2020, Bontempi spoke with the Federal News Network about the 2020 NASA International Space Apps Challenge and the potential use of satellite imagery as a part of solutions for the COVID-19 pandemic.

== Education ==
Bontempi received a B.S. in Biology from Boston College in 1992, an M.S. in Oceanography from Texas A&M University in 1995, and a Ph.D. from the University of Rhode Island in 2001.

== Awards and recognition ==
- Geosciences Distinguished Achievement Award, Texas A&M (2020)
- Fellow, The Oceanography Society (2019)
- Ocean Sciences Award from the American Geophysical Union (2019)
- NASA Exceptional Service Medal (2007), "... awarded to a Government employee for sustained performance that embodies multiple contributions which contribute to NASA projects, programs, or initiatives."
