= Phyllis Stabeno =

Physical oceanographer

- Education: Oregon State University
- Scientific career
- Workplaces: NOAA, Pacific Marine Environmental Laboratory
- Thesis: The reflection, transmission and scattering of internal waves at ocean fronts (1982)

Phyllis Jean Stabeno is a physical oceanographer known for her research on the movement of water in polar regions. She has led award-winning research projects in the Arctic and was noted for a distinguished scientific career by the National Oceanic and Atmospheric Administration.

== Education and career ==
Stabeno received her Ph.D. in 1982 from Oregon State University. As of 2021, she works at the National Oceanic and Atmospheric Administration (NOAA) within the Pacific Marine Environmental Laboratory.

== Research ==
Stabeno is known for her research on the water masses of the Arctic, long-term changes in the movement of water in the region, and the implications of these changes in the face of global climate change. Her early research examined currents off California and Oregon. She used current data from moorings and buoys that were tracked by satellites to characterize the movement of water in the vicinity of Kodiak Island, Alaska. She subsequently expanded to using satellite-tracked buoys to examine water movement in the Bering Sea, and conducted studies on the changes in the water movement in the region, especially in response to climate change. She has used moorings deployed on the continental shelf to track the Alaska Coastal Current and followed the movement of eggs and larvae from walleye pollock. Her work includes investigations into the Gulf of Alaska, the region near select Aleutian Islands, and the North Pacific Ocean. In the Bering Sea, her research has revealed warming of waters on the Bering Sea shelf, the physical oceanography of the Bering Sea, and an integration of data from the Bering Sea that spans multiple decades.

== Selected publications ==
- Hunt Jr, George L.; Stabeno, Phyllis; Walters, Gary; Sinclair, Elizabeth; Brodeur, Richard D.; Napp, Jeffery M.; Bond, Nicholas A. (2002-12-01). "Climate change and control of the southeastern Bering Sea pelagic ecosystem". Deep Sea Research Part II: Topical Studies in Oceanography. Ecology of the SE Bering Sea. 49 (26): 5821–5853. Bibcode:2002DSRII..49.5821H. doi:10.1016/S0967-0645(02)00321-1. ISSN 0967-0645. S2CID 55222333.
- Bond, N. A.; Overland, J. E.; Spillane, M.; Stabeno, P. (2003). "Recent shifts in the state of the North Pacific". Geophysical Research Letters. 30 (23): 2183. Bibcode:2003GeoRL..30.2183B. doi:10.1029/2003GL018597. ISSN 1944-8007. S2CID 130532536.
- Stabeno, P. J; Bond, N. A; Hermann, A. J; Kachel, N. B; Mordy, C. W; Overland, J. E (2004-05-01). "Meteorology and oceanography of the Northern Gulf of Alaska". Continental Shelf Research. 24 (7): 859–897. Bibcode:2004CSR....24..859S. doi:10.1016/j.csr.2004.02.007. ISSN 0278-4343.
- Stabeno, P. J.; Bond, N. A.; Kachel, N. B.; Salo, S. A.; Schumacher, J. D. (2001). "On the temporal variability of the physical environment over the south-eastern Bering Sea". Fisheries Oceanography. 10 (1): 81–98. doi:10.1046/j.1365-2419.2001.00157.x. ISSN 1365-2419.

== Awards and honors ==
Stabeno was the lead investigator for the Bering Ecosystem Study (BEST) and Bering Sea Integrated Ecosystem Research Plan (BSIERP) programs which won the Department of Commerce Gold Medal in 2015. In 2019 she received a Distinguished Career Award in Scientific Achievement from NOAA.
