= Mary Wilcox Silver =

American oceanographer

Mary Wilcox Silver is Professor Emerita at the University of California, Santa Cruz. Silver is known for research on marine snow and harmful algal blooms, setting the stage for woman conducting research in the field, and for mentoring and teaching of graduate and undergraduate students.

== Education and career ==
Silver received an A.B. in zoology from the University of California, Berkeley (1963), followed by graduate studies in animal physiology at the University of Tübingen, Germany (1963-1964), and then obtained a Ph.D. in oceanography from Scripps Institution of Oceanography (1971). In 1972, Silver joined the faculty of the Marine Studies Department at the University of California, Santa Cruz.

== Career and research ==
Silver's Ph.D. research was on the common salp, Salpa fusiformis where she defined the habitat of the salp in conjunction with its prey, diatoms.

Silver is best known for her research into marine snow, particles that are biological hotspots of activity in the water column and transfer organic matter to the deep ocean. In the 1970s, two of Silver's undergraduates wanted to use blue water diving for a research project. When they complained about all the particles in the water column, she suggested they capture the particles and see what was in the particles. When their preliminary analysis revealed the particles were concentrated in nutrients, she got $5000 from an administrator to continue the work which led to a seminal publication with Shanks and Trent about marine snow that was published in Science and a follow up paper in Limnology & Oceanography which quantified the increased levels of phytoplankton pigments on marine snow particles. In a 2019 interview, one of the undergraduates describes how Mary Silver introduced him to plankton and his early experiences with blue water diving to collect samples. In 1989, the New York Times called the biological organisms associated with the marine snow 'sea hitchhikers'.

Silver has also worked on harmful algal blooms and the toxins from phytoplankton that cause shellfish poison. Silver's research in this arena focuses on domoic acid which is produced by diatoms, where she has revealed a connection between the production of domoic acid and increased iron concentrations. In an article written by Silver on the history of shellfish poisoning she shared an anecdote from her time on sabbatical in Zanzibar. There, people knew certain parts of animals are toxic and thence avoid consuming them, in her example it was the liver from grouper which are commonly associated with ciguatera poisoning. Thus, even without testing each fish, humans retain information about the toxicity of a compound and Silver goes on to say

..the oldest bioassay is the "here, kitty" method. A cook calls a stray cat and feeds it a tiny bit of suspect food; if the cat is doing fine in an hour or two, the food is safe to cook

— Mary Wilcox Silver

Silver set the stage for women conducting research in the field which she describes in a 2005 article in Oceanography that she wrote upon the occasion of receiving the Mary Sears Award from Woods Hole Oceanographic Institution. As a graduate student, Silver was appointed chief scientist on a cruise with the R/V Ellen B. Scripps, a ship managed by Scripps Institution of Oceanography; she later learned this made her one of the first women to serve as chief scientist on a Scripps research vessel. She was the third female member of the faculty at the University of California, Santa Cruz and the second to have children. In 2002, Margaret Delaney noted "...Silver led the way for people with strong family commitments to go to sea, showing that scientists could combine challenging, field-based careers with family life."

In 2009, The Oceanography Society named her a fellow "For pioneering research on the ecology of marine organisms, excellence in teaching, mentoring and service to the oceanographic community".

== Awards ==
- 1992 Henry Bryant Bigelow Award from Woods Hole Oceanographic Institution
- 2001 Ricketts Memorial Award
- 2002 Mary Sears Woman Pioneer in Oceanography Award from Woods Hole Oceanographic Institution
- 2007 Fellow of the American Geophysical Union
- 2008 Honorary Lecturer, American Geophysical Union, Rachel Carson lecture
- 2009 Fellow, The Oceanography Society
- 2017 University of California, Santa Cruz establish the Mary Silver Award to support graduate student research

== Further reading and information ==
- Article written by Silver when she received the Mary Sears Woman Pioneer in Oceanography Award from Woods Hole Oceanographic Institution in 2002
- YouTube video of Silver's 2013 Moss Landing Marine Labs talk about marine snow in 2013
