= Clare Reimers =

American chemical oceanographer

Clare E. Reimers
- Scientific career
- Fields: Oceanography, Benthic Biogeochemistry
- Workplaces: Oregon State University
- Thesis: Sedimentary organic matter : distribution and alteration processes in the coastal upwelling region off Peru (1981)
- Doctoral advisor: Erwin Suess

Clare Reimers is a Distinguished Professor of Ocean Ecology and Biogeochemistry at Oregon State University's College of Earth, Ocean and Atmospheric Sciences.

== Education and career ==
Reimers earned a B.A. in Environmental Science from University of Virginia in 1976 and an M.S. in Oceanography from Oregon State University in 1978. Reimers holds a Ph.D. from Oregon State University from 1982. Subsequently, Reimers worked at Scripps Institution of Oceanography and Rutgers University before returning to Oregon State in 2000.

== Research and advances ==
In the 1970s, Reimers interned at NASA analyzing data from the Mars Viking project. Reimers' early oceanography research used a combination of methods to quantify the flux of organic carbon to the seafloor and the efficiency of its conversion to carbon dioxide. Reimers has developed benthic microbial fuel cells that generate power based on the redox gradient between reduced seafloor sediments and the oxidized seawater above the seafloor Reimers serves as Project Support Office Scientist for construction of up to three new Regional Class Research Vessels. The National Science Board awarded the project almost $472 million, which includes the initial 199 foot, R/V Taani. She holds U.S. Patent 6,913,854 for methane-powered microbial fuel cells, which have been used to power long-term underwater sensors.

== Awards ==
- Fellow, American Geophysical Union (2009)
- President, Ocean Sciences Section, American Geophysical Union (2021)
- Distinguished Professor, Oregon State University (2019)
- Fellow, The Oceanography Society (2019)
