= Cindy Lee (scientist) =

American oceanographer and chemist

Cindy Lee is a retired Distinguished Professor known for her research characterizing the compounds that comprise marine organic matter.

== Education and career ==
Lee has a B.S. in chemistry and B.S.E. in chemical engineering from Arizona State University (1970) and a Ph.D. from University of California San Diego, Scripps Institution of Oceanography (1975). Following her Ph.D., Lee became a postdoc at Woods Hole Oceanographic Institution in 1975 which transitioned into positions as an assistant scientist (1977–1981) and associate scientist (1981–1986). In 1987, Lee moved to SUNY Stony Brook where she remained until her retirement as a distinguished professor in 2016.

== Research ==
Lee's first published paper was as an undergraduate which she described as the "...thrill of discovering something new". As a graduate student at Scripps Institution of Oceanography, Lee examined the abundance of dissolved amino acids in seawater. Following graduate school, Lee moved to Woods Hole Oceanographic Institution where she first worked on sterols in marine sediments. In the early 1980s Lee began an extended collaboration with John Hedges, Stuart Wakeham and Michael Peterson which she described in a 2019 publication in Annual Reviews of Marine Science. This collaboration led to investigations into organic compounds found in particles sinking or suspended in the water column, and included developing new methods to capture particles and investigations into the preservation of organic matter.

In the 1990s, Lee joined researchers in the Joint Global Ocean Flux Study (JGOFS) in the Equatorial Pacific where she used information on the composition of compounds captured in sediment traps to estimate the degradation of organic material and its susceptibility to biological degradation. Lee also worked on the JGOFS Arabian Sea project where she examined the flux of organic carbon with changes in the Southwest Monsoon. Lee later joined with modelers to estimate fluxes of particulate organic carbon and the resulting implications to the global carbon cycle.

In 2019, Lee authored two papers that reflect back on her career and provide a path forward and questions for future scientists. In Annual Reviews of Marine Science, Lee focused on considerations regarding sampling organic matter and her observations regarding the state of graduate education in marine science. In Marine Chemistry, Wakeham and Lee summarized past research in marine organic biochemistry while providing a set of open research questions for future scientists to address.

== Awards ==
- Fellow, American Geophysical Union (1999)
- Harald Sverdrup Lecture, American Geophysical Union (2000)
- Hanse Wissenschaftskolleg Fellow (2003)
- Fellow, Geochemical Society/European Association of Geochemistry (2004)
- John Hedges Scholar, University of Washington (2010)
- G. Evelyn Hutchinson Award from the Association for the Sciences of Limnology and Oceanography (2011)
- Fellow, Association for the Sciences of Limnology and Oceanography (2015)

== Additional reading ==
- Wakeham, Stuart G.; Lee, Cindy (May 2019). "Limits of our knowledge, part 2: Selected frontiers in marine organic biogeochemistry". Marine Chemistry. 212: 16–46. Bibcode:2019MarCh.212...16W. doi:10.1016/j.marchem.2019.02.005. S2CID 146028590.
- Lee, Cindy (2019-01-03). "Passing the Baton to the Next Generation: A Few Problems That Need Solving". Annual Review of Marine Science. 11 (1): 1–13. Bibcode:2019ARMS...11....1L. doi:10.1146/annurev-marine-010318-095342. ISSN 1941-1405. PMID 29852088.
