= Gerold Siedler =

German physical oceanographer (born 1933)

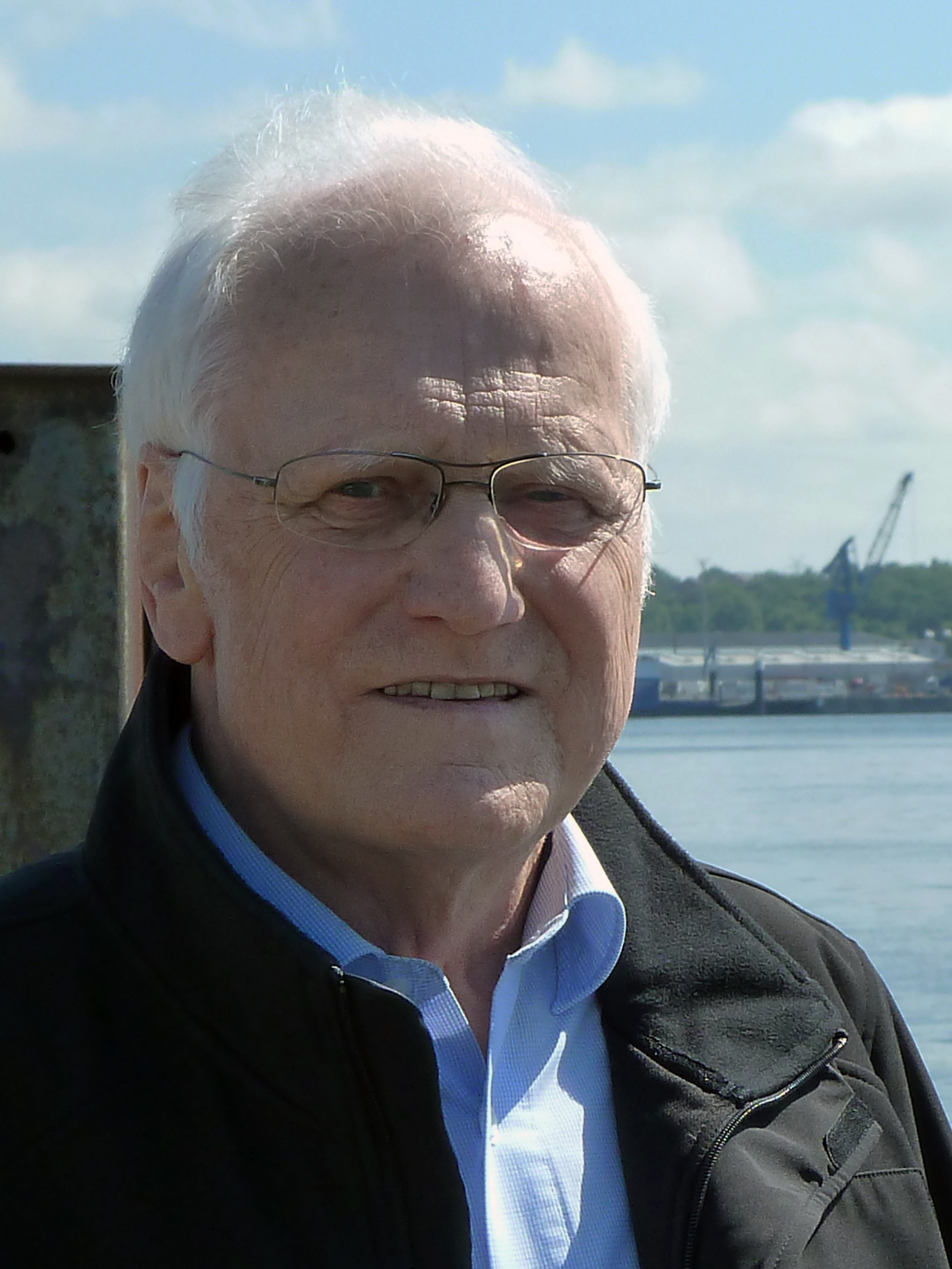
- Gerold Siedler in 2013
- Born: 16 August 1933; Olomouc, Czechoslovakia
- Scientific career
- Fields: Oceanography
- Institutions: Christian-Albrechts University of Kiel; GEOMAR Helmholtz Centre for Ocean Research Kiel
- Website: Siedler, Gerold « GEOMAR - Helmholtz-Zentrum für Ozeanforschung Kiel

Gerold Siedler (born 16 August 1933) is a German physical oceanographer. He is professor emeritus at the Christian-Albrechts University of Kiel and at the GEOMAR Helmholtz Centre for Ocean Research Kiel.

== Early life ==
Gerold Siedler was born in Olomouc, Czechoslovakia (now the Czech Republic). His movements during his childhood were influenced by the turmoil of World War II, until his family was finally reunited in 1946 in Plön, Schleswig-Holstein, West Germany. He attended schools in Liberec and Prague during the war, and Weimar after. He completed his secondary education (German: Abitur) in 1953 at the Gymnasium Schloss Plön.

== Professional positions and research ==
In 1953 Gerold Siedler started his studies in Physics, Mathematics and Geophysics at the Christian-Albrechts University of Kiel. He earned a doctoral degree in Physics in 1960 working with the applied physicist Werner Kroebel. His dissertation in the field of acoustics led him to develop a vocoder and explore speech discrimination in a reduced speech signal environment. Under the mentorship of Günter Dietrich, he subsequently started his career as a physical oceanographer at the Institute of Marine Science (German: Institut für Meereskunde Kiel, now GEOMAR Helmholtz Centre for Ocean Research Kiel), where he remained until retirement in 1998. He obtained his habilitation in oceanography and geophysics from the University of Kiel in 1966 for his work on the circulation and stratification at Bab-el-Mandeb, Red Sea.

He was appointed in 1969 as professor of physical oceanography at the same university. During his tenure at the Institut für Meereskunde and as professor of the University of Kiel, he held the following positions:

- Director of Marine Physics Department, 1969–1998
- Director of the Institut für Meereskunde, 1976–1978
- Dean of the Faculty of Mathematics and Natural Sciences of the University of Kiel, 1991–1992
- Emeritus Professor, since 1998

His work contributed in advancing knowledge on ocean circulation and climate, boundary currents, oceanic fronts, flow through straits, mixing processes, and internal waves. In addition, he was actively involved in the development of oceanographic instruments.

Siedler undertook 28 research expeditions, most of them as chief scientist. He spent time on the German vessel RV Meteor II (1964), and helped in the design of its successor, the RV Meteor III (1986). He played a fundamental role in designing the World Ocean Circulation Experiment (WOCE) program including defining standards for oceanographic sampling, which were pivotal for the success of the program. At the culmination of the WOCE, he co-edited the first edition of the "Ocean Circulation and Climate: Observing and Modelling the Global Ocean" book published in 2001, and subsequently its second edition "Ocean Circulation and Climate: A 21st Century Perspective" in 2013.

Over the years, Siedler held several positions as visiting scientist in the USA, France, Spain and South Africa. Most notably, he collaborated with scientists at the Woods Hole Oceanographic Institution, the University of Hawaii, the University of Miami and NOAA/AOML, the Jet Propulsion Laboratory in Pasadena, Université Pierre et Marie Curie, IFREMER in Brest, Instituto Canario de Ciencias Marinas, and the University of Cape Town.

== Teaching ==
As a Privatdozent and subsequently a professor at the University of Kiel, Gerold Siedler taught since 1966. He additionally held appointments as visiting professor at Woods Hole Oceanographic Institution/Massachusetts Institute of Technology (United States), at the International Centre for Theoretical Physics (Trieste, Italy), the University of Hamburg (Germany), the Universidad de Las Palmas de Gran Canaria (Gran Canaria, Spain), Universidad de La Laguna (Tenerife, Spain), and the University of Concepción (Chile). He supervised the scholarly works of no less than 70 Diplom, Doctoral, and Habilitation students in Kiel.

== Services to professional bodies ==
=== National appointments ===
German Research Foundation:

- Commission for water research, 1968–1977
- Commission for oceanography, 1974–1995; Chair, 1986–1995
- German Scientific Committee on Oceanic Research, 1975–1995; Chair, 1980–1995
- Committee for the German meteorological research aircraft, 1978
- Oceanography and Physics of the atmosphere, Elected referee, 1980–1988

German federal ministry for science and technology (now Bundesministerium für Bildung und Forschung):

- Committee for Research Vessels and Underwater Systems, 1969–1971
- Committee for Measurement Technology, 1970–1973
- Committee for Permanent Buoy Stations in the North and Baltic Seas, 1974–1975
- Commission for Marine Research and Ocean Technology, 1975–1978
- German-Brazilian bilateral research programs in ocean science and technology Coordinator, 1983–1989
- German World Ocean Circulation Experiment (WOCE) Committee Chair, 1986–1989

GKSS Research Centre Geesthacht

- Technical and scientific advisory board, 1976–1981

=== International appointments ===
Scientific Committee on Oceanic Research (SCOR) of the International Council for Science (ICSU):

- Working Group 21 "Current meter intercomparison" Member, 1966–1974
- Working Group 34 "Internal dynamics of the ocean" Member, 1976–1982
- Working Group 43 "Oceanography related to the GARP Atlantic Tropical Experiment (GATE)", Chair, 1972–1978
- SCOR Vice-president, 1980–1983; President, 1983–1988, Past-President, 1988–1992

International Association for the Physical Sciences of the Oceans (IAPSO) of the International Union of Geodesy and Geophysics (IUGG):

- Vice-president, 1975–1979

Programme National d'Etude de la Dynamique du Climat (PNEDC), France:

- Scientific committee member, 1988–1992

Scientific Steering Group of the World Ocean Circulation Experiment (WOCE):

- Member of the Executive, 1989–1993

Woods Hole Oceanographic Institution, United States:

- Visiting Committee Member, 1992

European Commission, Brussels Mid-Term Evaluation Panel, Marine Science and Technology Program:

- Member, 1995

== Awards ==
- Dedicated special volume "New Views of the Atlantic: A Tribute to Gerold Siedler", Deep Sea Research Part II: Topical Studies in Oceanography, 1999.
- Alexander von Humboldt - Research Award 2004/2005, National Research Foundation, South Africa.

== Sources ==
- Biography at GEOMAR Helmholtz Centre for Ocean Research Kiel
