= Günter Dietrich =

German oceanographer (1911–1972)

Günter Dietrich (November 15, 1911 – October 2, 1972) was a German oceanographer. The first to describe the Agulhas Current in detail, he provided essential contributions to the understanding of bottom water exchange in the North Atlantic and shaped marine research in Germany after World War II.

== Early life and academic work ==
Günter Dietrich was born in Berlin. From 1931 to 1935 he studied geography, meteorology, mathematics, physics and oceanography at the Friedrich-Wilhelms-Universität zu Berlin (see Humboldt University of Berlin). He received his Doctor of Philosophy in 1935. (Note: Hans Ulrich Roll: In memoriam Günter Dietrich 1911 - 1972. In: Meteor Forschungsergebnisse. A 12, Berlin 1973, S. 33-43.) with a dissertation on the structure and dynamics of the Agulhas Current. (Note: Günter Dietrich: Aufbau und Dynamik des südlichen Agulhasstromgebietes. In: Veröffentlichungen des Institut für Meereskunde an der Universität Berlin. Berlin 1935, N.F. 27, S. 1-79 (Structure and dynamics of the southern Agulhas Current region).) His advisor was Albert Defant. (Note: Institut für Meereskunde: "Günter Dietrich † 2. Oktober 1972." In: "Christiana Albertina" 1973, 15, S. 92-93.) This work provided the first detailed description of the Agulhas Current System, based on observational data available at the time. The South African oceanographer Johann Lutjeharms later called him "the first true oceanographer of the Agulhas Current System" in his book on the Agulhas Current (Note: Johann R. E. Lutjeharms: German research on the Agulhas Current System between the World Wars : a lost scientific achievement. In: Historisch-Meereskundliches Jahrbuch. 2005, 11 S. 73-98.) (Note: Johann R. E. Lutjeharms: The Agulhas Current. Berlin 2006, S. VI, 2-3, 19.)

From 1935 to 1943 he was scientific assistant at the de:Museum für Meereskunde (Berlin) (Institute and Museum for Oceanography) and participated in four cruises on the German survey ship Meteor in the North Atlantic and the Caribbean Sea. (Note: Manfred Stein: Meteor I: Die zweite Teilfahrt der Deutschen Nordatlantischen Expedition, Januar bis Juli 1938." Book on demand, Internationales Maritimes Museum Hamburg, epubli GmbH, Berlin 2015, 45 Abb., S. 1-41 (Meteor I: The second part of the cruise during the German North Atlantic Expedition, January to July 1938).) He was drafted into the German Navy during World War II (WWII) and served as oceanographer at the Naval Observatory in Wilhelmshaven and Greifswald. He was in charge of 12 cruises on the navy survey ships "Triton" and "Börgen" in the Baltic Sea and off Norway. (Note: Günter Dietrich: "Wissenschaftlicher Werdegang." Kiel, im Juli 1959. Maschinenschr. 2 S.; DWK-Akte: Mitglieder 1950-1964. (unpublished manuscript, copy in collection Wegner).) (Note: Gerd Wegner: "Sonderkolloquium - 100 Jahre Günter Dietrich." Mit Beiträgen von Bernd Brügge, Gerold Siedler, Arne Biastoch, Gotthilf Hempel und Ursel Schauer. In: "DGM-Mitteilungen." 3/11, Deutsche Gesellschaft für Meeresforschung, Hamburg 2011, S. 7 – 25.) The tasks included investigations of sound propagation, tides and tidal currents. During WWII he was able to obtain his habilitation (permission to teach) for geophysics and oceanography in 1943 at Berlin University with a thesis on semidiurnal and diurnal tides (Note: Günter Dietrich: Die Schwingungssysteme der halb- und eintägigen Tiden in den Ozeanen. In: Veröffentlichungen des Institut für Meereskunde an der Universität Berlin. Berlin 1944, N.F. (A) 41, S. 1-68 (The oscillating systems of semi-diurnal and diurnal tides in the oceans).) and was appointed custodian at the Institute for Oceanography in Berlin. After the end of WWII and some time as prisoner of war, he was employed by the British Navy occupying forces, partly at their headquarters in Hamburg-Blankenese, from April 1946 to August 1950. He also ran an engineering consultancy on oceanographic instrumentation during part of the time. In 1950 he became a member of the German Hydrographic Office (DHI) in Hamburg (see Federal Maritime and Hydrographic Agency of Germany). He was responsible for regional oceanography and participated in several cruises on the survey and research vessels "Gauss" and "Anton Dohrn". He also became a lecturer in oceanography at Hamburg University in 1953 and adjunct professor in 1957

In 1959 he became the successor of Georg Wüst in Kiel. He was appointed Professor of Oceanography and Maritime Meteorology at the Christian Albrecht University in Kiel (see University of Kiel) and Director of the Institut für Meereskunde Kiel (see ) of Kiel University (Note: Walter Zenk, Gerold Siedler, Peter C. Wille, Gerd Wegner, Jörn Thiede, Volker Storch, Peter Speth, Eberhard Ruprecht, Manfred Ehrhardt, Bernt Zeitzschel: "Early oceanography and the development of physical and chemical marine sciences in Kiel after World War II." In: "Deutsches Schiffahrtsarchiv, Wissenschaftliches Jahrbuch des Deutschen Schiffahrtsmuseums", Bremerhaven, 39, 2018, (angegebenes Erscheinungsdatum 2016, aber tatsächlich veröffentlicht 2018), ISSN 0343-3668 ISBN 978-3-86927-039-5, S. 41-72.) (Note: Thiede, J., W.W. Hay, M. Sarnthein, P. Schäfer, G. Siedler, P. Stoffers, V. Storch, E. Suess, R. von Huene, P.C. Wille, B. Zeitzschel, W. Zenk: "From a modest start to a flourishing marine research environment: The institutional development of marine geosciences in Kiel/ Germany after World War II." In: "Deutsches Schiffahrtsarchiv, Wissenschaftliches Jahrbuch des Deutschen Schiffahrtsmuseums", Bremerhaven, 39, 2018, (given year date 2016, but published in 2018), SSN 0343-3668, ISBN 978-3-86927-039-5, S. 95-144.) (Note: Webseite von SSOAR. Access on September 25, 2018.) (Note: Webseite von SSOAR. Access on September 25, 2018.). Under his direction the institute increased considerably, international relationships were renewed (Note: K . McElheny: Revival of Oceanography in Germany. In: Science. 146, 1964, S. 45 – 48.) (Note: Wolfgang Krauss: Günter Dietrichs Kieler Jahre (1959 - 1972). In: Christiana Albertina. Neumünster 1987, 24 N.F. S. 43-54 (Günter Dietrich's years in Kiel (1959 - 1972))) and Kiel University became the prime institution for marine sciences education in Germany. His textbook (Note: Günter Dietrich, Kurt Kalle: "Allgemeine Meereskunde." Borntraeger, Berlin 1957, S. 1-492 (Russische Übersetzung Leningrad 1962) (General oceanography).) (Note: Günter Dietrich, Kurt Kalle, Wolfgang Krauss, Gerold Siedler: "Allgemeine Meereskunde." 3. Auflage, Borntraeger, Berlin 1975, S. 1-593 (General oceanography).) (Note: Günter Dietrich, Kurt Kalle, Wolfgang Krauss, Gerold Siedler: "General Oceanography." 2. Auflage, translated by Susanne und Hans Ulrich Roll, John Wiley & Sons, New York 1980, S. 1-626.) was the standard reading for students. Dietrich also carried outstanding responsibility in planning the new research vessel "Meteor" . The ship was put into service in 1964 and had its first major cruise in the International Indian Ocean Expedition in 1964/1965. Dietrich later had major responsibilities in planning and preparing the multi-national ICES expedition OVERFLOW 1973. He died in Kiel, aged 60, a few months before the start of the program.

The main topics in Dietrich's 149 publications (Note: Gerold Siedler, Regina Bröcker: Bibliographie Günter Dietrich. In: Meteor Forschungsergebnisse Berlin 1980, S. 71-74.) are: the dynamics of ocean currents, the stratification and mixing of water masses and their variability, the morphology of the ocean's bottom and the influence of topography on the spreading of water masses, and sound propagation in the ocean. During the work for his doctoral dissertation on the Agulhas Current System he was able to use data sets from the "Meteor" Expedition 1925-1927 (Note: Fritz Spiess: Die Meteorfahrt. Forschungen und Erlebnisse der Deutschen Atlantischen Expedition. Dietrich Reimers, Berlin 1928, S. 1-375 (englisch The Stratosphere of the Atlantic Ocean übersetzt vom Al-Ahram Center for Scientific Translations, Translation edited by William J. Emery, Amerind Publishing Co. Pvt. Ltd., New Delhi, 1978, 1-112, 1 - 429 (The Meteor Expedition. Scientific Results of the German Atlantic Expedition, 1925-1927).) and additional data from some other ships. For the first time the Agulhas Current System was described also in deep layers. He also compared the properties of the Agulhas Current and the Gulf Stream (Note: Günter Dietrich: Aufbau und Bewegung von Golfstrom und Agulhasstrom, eine vergleichende Betrachtung. In: Naturwissenschaften. 1936, 24 (15), S. 225-230 (Structure and motion of the Gulf Stream and the Agulhas Current, a comparative examination).) and described the Agulhas Current as a branch of the Atlantic circulation. (Note: Günter Dietrich: Zur Dynamik des Atlantischen Zweiges des Agulhasstromes. In: Annalen der Hydrographie und Maritimen Meteorologie. 1935, 63, S. 383-387 (On the dynamics of the Atlantic branch of the Agulhas Current).) He remained interested in the Gulf Stream, in particular in the relationship of pressure fields and currents (Note: Günter Dietrich: Das ozeanische "Nivellement" und seine Anwendung auf die Golfküste und die atlantische Küste der Vereinigten Staaten von Amerika In: Zeitschrift für Geophysik. 1936, 12, S. 287-298 (The oceanic leveling and its application to the Gulf Coast and the Atlantic coast of the United States of America).) (Note: Günter Dietrich: Die Lage der Meeresoberfläche im Druckfeld von Ozean und Atmosphäre mit besonderer Berücksichtigung des westlichen Nordatlantischen Ozeans und des Golfs von Mexiko. In: Veröffentlichungen des Institut für Meereskunde an der Universität Berlin. Berlin 1937, N.F.(A) 33, S. 5-52 (The location of the sea surface in the pressure field of ocean and atmosphere with special consideration of the western North Atlantic Ocean and the Gulf of Mexico).) and the origin of Gulf Stream water masses. (Note: Günter Dietrich: Über Bewegung und Herkunft des Golfstromwassers. In: Veröffentlichungen des Institut für Meereskunde an der Universität Berlin. Berlin 1935, N.F.(A) 33, S. 53-91 (On the motion and origin of the Gulf Stream water).) With geography as an essential field in his education, he kept returning to morphological studies (Note: Günter Dietrich: Einige morphologische Ergebnisse der "Meteor"-Fahrt Januar bis Mai 1938. In: Annalen der Hydrographie und maritimen Meteorologie. Beiheft Januar, 1939, 67, S. 20-23 (Some morphological results of the "Meteor" cruise from January to May 1938).) (Note: Günter Dietrich: Zur Topographie und Morphologie des Meeresbodens im nördlichen Nordatlantischen Ozean. In: Deutsche Hydrographische Zeitschrift. Ergänzungsheft 3, 1939, S. 26-34 (On the topography and morphology of the sea bottom in the northern North Atlantic Ocean).) (Note: Günter Dietrich: Zur Topographie der Anton-Dohrn-Kuppe. In: Kieler Meeresforschungen. 17, 1961, S. 3-7 (On the Topography of the Anton-Dohrn Seamount).) (Note: Günter Dietrich, Johannes Ulrich: "Atlas zur Ozeanographie." Meyers Großer Physikalischer Weltatlas 7, Bibliographisches Institut, Mannheim 1968, S. 1-76 (Atlas for oceanography).) and to the relationship of topography and bottom water flow. (Note: Günter Dietrich: Überströmung des Island-Färöer-Rückens in Bodennähe nach Beobachtungen mit dem Forschungsschiff "Anton Dohrn" 1955/56. In: Deutsche Hydrographische Zeitschrift. 9, 1956, S. 78-89 (Overflow over the Iceland-Färöer ridge near the sea bottom as observed during the cruises of the research ship "Anton Dohrn" 1955/56).) (Note: Günter Dietrich: Die Überströmung des Island-Färöer-Rückens, eine Voruntersuchung zum internationalen "Overflow-Programm" im Juni 1960. In: Kieler Meeresforschungen. 16, 1960, S. 9-12 (The overflow across the Iceland-Faroe Ridge, a preliminary investigation for the international "Overflow.Program" in June 1960).) He contributed considerably to the knowledge on the transport, distribution and mixing of water masses in the North Atlantic, the North Sea, the Baltic Sea and the Mediterranean. A selection of papers is cited here. (Note: Günter Dietrich: Das Mittelmeer. In: Zeitschrift der Gesellschaft für Erdkunde. Berlin 1939, 3/4, S. 108-130 (The Mediterranean Sea).) (Note: Günter Dietrich: Die anomale Jahresschwankung des Wärmeinhalts im Englischen Kanal, ihre Ursachen und Auswirkungen. In: Deutsche Hydrographische Zeitschrift. 3, 1950, S. 184-201 (The anomalous annual variation of heat content in the water of the English Channel, its causes and effects).) (Note: Günter Dietrich: Oberflächenströmungen im Kattegat, im Sund und in der Beltsee. In: Deutsche Hydrographische Zeitschrift. 4, 1951, S. 129-150 (Surface currents in the Kattegat, the Sound, and the Belt Sea).) (Note: Günter Dietrich, Hartwig Weidemann: Strömungsverhältnisse in der Lübecker Bucht. In: Die Küste. 1, 1952, S. 69-89.) (Note: Günter Dietrich: Thermal stratification of the North Sea in August 1953. In: Annalen der Biologie. 1954, 10, S. 80-82.) (Note: Günter Dietrich: Hydrographic conditions in the Central and Northern North Sea in August 1955 in June 1955. In: Annalen der Biologie. 1957, 12, S. 71-73.) (Note: Günter Dietrich: Stratification and circulation of the Irminger Sea in June 1955. In: Annalen der Biologie. 1957, 12, S. 36-38.) (Note: Günter Dietrich: Die natürlichen Regionen von Nord- und Ostsee auf hydrographischer Grundlage. In: Kieler Meeresforschungen. 7, 1960, S. 38-69 (The natural regions of the North and Baltic Sea based on hydrography).) (Note: Günter Dietrich: Eine Forschungsfahrt zur Untersuchung der kurzfristigen Schwankungen in der Schichtung und Bewegung der Ostsee im Sommer 1960. In: Kieler Meeresforschungen. 17, 1961, S. 135-136 (A research cruise to investigate the short-term variations in the stratification and movement of the Baltic, in summer 1960).) (Note: Günter Dietrich: New hydrographical aspects of the Northwest Atlantic . In: International Commission for the Northwest Atlantic Fisheries, Special Publication. 1965, 6, S. 29-51.) The hydrographic atlas of the northern North Atlantic, produced on behalf of ICES, became an important collection of observational results. (Note: Günter Dietrich: Atlas of the Hydrography of the northern North Atlantic Ocean. International Council for the Exploration of the Sea (ICES), Copenhagen 1969, S. 1-140.) Following his work on semidiurnal and diurnal tides, (Note: Günter Dietrich: Die Gezeiten des Weltmeeres als geographische Erscheinung. In: Zeitschrift der Gesellschaft für Erdkunde. Berlin 1944, 3/4, S. 69-85 (The tides of the world ocean as a geographic phenomenon).) (Note: Günter Dietrich: Influences of tidal streams on oceanographic and climatic conditions in the sea as exemplified by the English Channel. In: Nature. 1951, 168, S. 6-11.) he became a respected expert on tides in the open ocean. During a time when the tides in the open ocean had to be determined solely from coastal gauges, his tidal maps were considered a standard in the field. Dietrich was always prepared to use an holistic approach in marine research. He was interested in interdisciplinary problems, in particular the interactions between bottom topography and fisheries hydrography (Note: Günter Dietrich, Dietrich Sarhage, Kurt Schubert: "Locating fish concentrations by thermometric methods" In: Kristjonss (Ed.) "Modern fishing gear of the world." Fishing News (Books) Ltd., London 1959, S. 453-461.) (Note: Günter Dietrich: On the relationship between the distribution of redfish and redfish larvae and the hydrographical conditions in the Irminger Sea. In: Rapports et procès-verbaux des réunions / Conseil permanent international pour l'exploration de la mer. 1961, 150, S. 124-139.) (Note: Günter Dietrich: Fischereihydrographie im Rahmen der internationalen Meeresforschung. In: Berichte der deutschen wissenschaftlichen Kommission für Meeresforschung. 1962, 17, S. 21-26 (Fishery hydrography in the framework of international marine research).) In his textbook he frequently discussed relations between the results of different disciplines.

== Family ==
Günter Dietrich was married to Liselotte Dietrich, née Martin, since 1939. They had two children. The son drowned at young age. Dietrich's daughter Sigrid married the marine geologist de:Jörn Thiede in 1970.

== Awards ==
Honorary Doctorate, University of Rennes, France, 1970

== Memberships ==
Member, Academy of Sciences Leopoldina, Halle, from 1969

Member, German Scientific Commission for Marine Research, 1950-1972

Member, Advisory Board of the Federal Ministry for Science and Technology (Note: Günther Böhnecke, Adolf Bückmann: Günther Dietrich 15.11.1911 - 2.10.1972. In: Berichte der Deutschen Wissenschaftlichen Kommission für Meeresforschung. 22, 1973, S. 463-471.)

Member, Advisory Board of the Institute of Sea Fisheries

Member, Commission on Marine Research and Marine Technology, Federal Ministry for Research and Technology, 1969-1972

== Offices ==
Director, Oceanographic Institute of Kiel University, 1959-1968

Chair, German Scientific Commission for Marine Research, 1959-1969

Dean, Faculty of Mathematics and Sciences, University of Kiel, 1965

Marine Science Advisor to Unesco, from 1958

Senator, German Research Foundation (Deutsche Forschungsgemeinschaft (DFG), 1964-1969

Chair, Senate Commission on Oceanography, DFG, 1962-1969

Chair, Hydrographic Committee, ICES, 1966-1969

Vice President, International Council for the Exploration of the Sea (ICES), 1967-1970 (Note: A J Lee: Günter Dietrich 15 November 1911 - 2 October 1972. In: Journal du Conseil / Conseil Permanent International pour l’Exploration de la Mer. 36 1, 1974, S. 4-6.)

Chair, German Committee for the Scientific Committee on Oceanic Research (SCOR/ICSU), 1964-1967

President, International Association for the Physical Sciences of the Ocean (IAPSO/IUGG), 1967-1970

First Chair, Joint Panel on Oceanographic Tables and Standards (JPOTS) of Unesco, ICES, SCOR, IAPSO (Note: Joris Gieskes, Selim Morcos: "In memory of Günther Dietrich (1911-1972)". In: "Unesco International Marine Science Newsletter.", 30, Special Issue 1981-82, 1982, S. 4.)

Captain Cook Chair for Oceanography, University of Hawaii, Honolulu, U.S.A., 1969-1970 (Note: Institut für Meereskunde an der Universität Kiel: Jahresbericht für das Jahr 1970. In: .Kieler Meeresforschungen. 27, 1, 1970, S. 58 (Annual report for the year 1970).)

== Bibliography ==
English translations of titles are provided in parentheses.
