= Sergey Gulev =

Sergey Konstantinovich Gulev
- Born: November 29, 1958 (age 67); Moscow, Russia
- Education: Moscow State University
- Known for: Ocean-atmosphere heat fluxes IPCC Lead Author 2007, 2014, 2022; Ocean surface waves
- Scientific career
- Fields: Oceanography, Climate Physics
- Workplaces: Shirshov Institute of Oceanology, Russian Academy of Sciences; Moscow State University
- Thesis: Interaction of the ocean and atmosphere at different spatio-temporal scales (Habilitation). (Candidate of Physics and Mathematics (PhD), 1986; Doctor of Physics and Mathematics (Habilitation), 1997)
- Academic advisors: S. S. Lappo; G. I. Barenblatt

Sergey Konstantinovich Gulev (Russian: Сергей Константинович Гулев; born November 29, 1958) is a Russian climate scientist. He is head of the ocean-atmosphere interaction laboratory at the Shirshov Institute of Oceanology, Russian Academy of Sciences and is a professor of oceanology and meteorology at Moscow State University. In 2011, he was elected as a Corresponding Member of the Russian Academy of Sciences.

He served as a lead author of the 2007 and 2014 IPCC Scientific Assessment Reports on Climate Change, and is currently (as of 2018) coordinating lead author in the forthcoming Sixth Assessment Report.

== Awards ==
He was a Humboldt Fellow 1992/1993 at the Institut für Meereskunde Kiel, now called GEOMAR Helmholtz Centre for Ocean Research Kiel.
