= Georg Wüst =

German oceanographer

Georg Adolf Otto Wüst
- Born: Georg Adolf Otto Wüst; 15 June 1890; Posen, Germany (today Poland)
- Died: 8 November 1977 (aged 87); Erlangen, Germany
- Education: University of Berlin
- Known for: Atlantic Ocean, German Atlantic expedition
- Scientific career
- Fields: oceanographer
- Workplaces: University of Kiel
- Doctoral advisor: Alfred Merz

Georg Adolf Otto Wüst (15 June 1890 - 8 November 1977) was a German oceanographer. His pioneering work on the Atlantic Ocean provided a new view of the motions of water masses between the northern and southern hemispheres and the first evidence of the concentration of water mass spreading in western boundary currents.

== Life ==
Wüst was the son of the Prussian civil servant Max Wüst and his wife Clara. The family soon moved to Berlin, Germany. He attended the Charlottenburg high school in Berlin. He then studied geography and oceanography, with additional education in meteorology, mathematics and physics, at the Friedrich-Wilhelm-University in Berlin (see Humboldt University of Berlin) from 1910. His most important teachers were Albrecht Penck and in particular Alfred Merz. Penck had been the head of the geographic department, including the Museum of Marine Sciences (German: Museum für Meereskunde), since 1905. The Austrian hydrographer Alfred Merz became his successor in 1910. The Institute and Museum of Marine Sciences became an independent unit of the university in 1920, with Merz as director.

In 1912 Merz made it possible for Wüst to join Bjørn Helland-Hansen in Bergen/Norway, thus getting to know the Norwegian colleagues' methods. Wüst then gained practical experience in ocean observations by working on lightships, on surveying vessels and during cruises on the Norwegian research vessel "Armauer Hansen" in the Nordic Seas led by Helland-Hansen. Merz became Wüst's advisor for his doctoral thesis. Although Wüst passed the examinations in 1914, he only received the degree in 1919 when his thesis was printed after World War I. During the war he served as a meteorologist and was wounded near Verdun in 1917. After the war he became an assistant of Merz and participated in several research cruises in the North and Baltic Seas.

Merz was planning a systematic hydrographic survey of the Atlantic Ocean. His proposal was met with approval by the key scientific institution in Germany after World War I, the Emergency Association of German Science (see Notgemeinschaft der Deutschen Wissenschaft). The German survey ship Meteor was made available for observations in the South Atlantic and the North Atlantic up to 30°N. Wüst participated in much of the planning and then joined the cruise from 1925 to 1927. When the chief scientist Merz died in Buenos Aires in June 1925, Wüst took over the leadership for the oceanographic observations.

After the expedition Wüst predominantly worked on the evaluation of the obtained data sets at the Berlin institute. He obtained the permission to teach (Habilitation) at the Friedrich-Wilhelm-University in Berlin in 1929 with a thesis on the Florida Current and was appointed Professor in 1936. In the meantime he had become a well-esteemed member of the international marine science community. However, all these connections broke down with the approach of World War II. Wüst had become a member of the NSDAP and served as a member of the nautical-scientific staff at the Supreme Command of the Navy during the war. At the same time, however, he continued teaching at the Friedrich-Wilhelm-University in Berlin.

The Institute and Museum of Marine Sciences in Berlin was destroyed by bombing in 1944 and was never rebuilt after the end of World War II.

In early 1946 Wüst was offered the job of rebuilding marine research in Kiel, Germany. The Institute of Marine Science (German: Institut für Meereskunde Kiel) of the University of Kiel (German: Christian-Albrechts-Universität zu Kiel, CAU) had also lost many members of its staff and its building by a bombing raid. Wüst became Professor of Oceanography and Maritime Meteorology at Kiel University and Director of the Institute of Marine Science. He succeeded in bringing back some of the earlier staff, was provided with an old villa as an institute building, obtained the research cutter Südfall and restarted marine science teaching. The main focus of the institute in Kiel had been marine biology in the shallow seas of the Baltic and the North Sea before, with some history of hydrography, marine chemistry and marine geology. Wüst brought his experience in deep-sea research to bear in the scientific orientation of the Kiel institute. He and ultimately his successor from 1959, Günter Dietrich, an earlier collaborator in the Berlin institute, changed the earlier focus towards deep ocean work, in particular in physical oceanography and marine chemistry. With this scientific orientation and the related teaching the Kiel institute took over the legacy of the Berlin institute. In particular the teaching required a close association with Kiel University. From 1950 to 1952 Wüst served as Dean of the Faculty of Philosophy which also enclosed Mathematics and Science at that time.

After his retirement at Kiel University in 1959, Wüst followed an invitation to be a visiting professor at the Lamont–Doherty Earth Observatory in Columbia-University, New York, USA. Here, his main focus was the circulation in the Caribbean Sea. During this stay in the USA, Wüst also accepted an invitation in 1962 to the Walker-Ames-Chair of the University of Washington in Seattle. After his return to Germany in 1965 he was a visiting professor at the Institute of Meteorology of the University of Bonn (German: Rheinische Friedrich-Wilhelms-Universität Bonn) in Germany until 1967.

Georg Wüst was married to Martha Wüst from 1921 until she died in 1941. They had two children. From 1943 he was remarried to Maria Wüst.

== Scientific achievements ==
Wüst stood out by the ability of gaining a profound understanding of ocean processes from a systematic description and analysis of oceanic data sets, in particular the property exchange, the origin of water masses and their large-scale motions and transports. His main research themes were: evaporation and precipitation and the water budget of the ocean, the large-scale distribution and circulation of deep water masses in the Atlantic and other oceans, the motions of Gulf Stream and Kuroshio, the origin of polar bottom waters and the circulation in the Mediterranean Sea. In his later years there followed treatises on the history of deep-sea research. Dietrich (1972) presented a complete list of Wüst's 112 publications in his contribution to the book which was published as a tribute to Wüst's 80th birthday.

For his doctoral thesis Wüst performed systematic observations of evaporation on several vessels, developed specific analysis methods and discussed distribution patterns of evaporation in the world oceans. He returned to the related topics of evaporation, precipitation and salinity at the ocean-atmosphere interface and their relevance for the water budget at numerous times through the following decades.

During the 1920-1924 period the preparations of the "Meteor"-Expedition (1925-1927) together with Merz dominated his work. However, already at that time there were some fundamental publications on the Atlantic vertical circulation including an important interhemispheric exchange of water masses and on the Florida and Antilles Current, followed up later by work on the Gulf Stream and Kuroshio. His most productive years occurred after the "Meteor"-Expedition with the analysis of the "Meteor" data sets in cooperation with Albert Defant and the publication of the "Scientific Results of the German Atlantic Expedition of the Research Vessel "Meteor"" 1925-27. His pioneering analysis of the large-scale distribution of Atlantic water masses and their regions of origin showed the strong role of interhemispheric exchange and provided the first evidence for the concentration of water mass spreading in western boundary currents. In this work the Core Method developed by Wüst was an essential tool for the studies of circulation. The series was considered of such importance that the U.S. National Science Foundation facilitated the translation into English during the 1970s and 1980s. Until present times the data set is considered a most important basis for research in the Atlantic Ocean.

But Wüst did not limit himself to Atlantic research, other oceans were investigated in comparison. He also had a particular interest in the origin and spreading of deep bottom water. Wüst carried out important studies of adjacent seas. Already in his early years he showed that vertical convection in the Okhotsk Sea produces water masses that provide an essential source of North Pacific Intermediate Water. His results on the European Mediterranean Sea provided an important basis for later investigations He provided an improved view on the circulation in the Caribbean Sea during his stay at Lamont. He also contributed to some studies in the Baltic His studies of sea bottom topography indicated his long-standing interest in geography.

Wüst always tried to work systematically. He therefore considered the network of stations of the "Meteor" Atlantic Expedition the obvious blueprint for the International Indian Ocean Expedition (IIOE) 1959-1965. The time was not yet right for his proposal, and only during the World Ocean Circulation Experiment (WOCE) 1990-1998 (https://www.nodc.noaa.gov/woce/wdiu/updates/Data_Resource.pdf) a station pattern similar to his proposal was established. Several of Wüst's later papers dealt with historical aspects of marine science, in particular the development of oceanography and important deep-sea expeditions.

== Awards and Honorary Memberships ==
1928 Honorary Member, Royal Dutch Geographical Society

1928 Carl-Ritter-Medal (Silver), Berlin Geographical Society (German: Gesellschaft für Erdkunde zu Berlin

1935 Honorary Member, Frankfurt Geographical Society (German:Frankfurter Geographische Gesellschaft)

The German Society for Marine Research (German: Deutsche Gesellschaft für Meeresforschung) awards the Georg-Wüst-Prize since 2005.
