= Institut für Meereskunde Kiel =

German institute for marine sciences

The Institut für Meereskunde (IfM; English: Institute of Marine Sciences) in Kiel, Germany, existed from April 1, 1937 to January 1, 2004. It was an essential element of the long history of marine sciences in Kiel. This history started with the work of Samuel Reyher published in 1697 and is today continued within the GEOMAR Helmholtz Centre for Ocean Research Kiel. (Note: Walter Zenk, Gerold Siedler, Peter C. Wille, Gerd Wegner, Jörn Thiede, Volker Storch, Peter Speth, Eberhard Ruprecht, Manfred Ehrhardt, Bernt Zeitzschel: "Early oceanography and the development of physical and chemical marine sciences in Kiel after World War II." In: "Deutsches Schiffahrtsarchiv, Wissenschaftliches Jahrbuch des Deutschen Schiffahrtsmuseums", Bremerhaven, 39, 29-93. Bremerhaven 2018, 39, S. 29 – 93.) (Note: Jörn Thiede, William Hay, Michael Sarnthein, Priska Schäfer, Gerold Siedler, Peter Stoffers, Volker Storch, Erwin Suess, Roland von Huene, Peter Wille, Bernt Zeitzschel, Walter Zenk: “From a Modest Start to a Flourishing Marine Research Environment: The Institutional Development of Marine Geosciences in Kiel/ Germany after World War II.” In: “Deutsches Schiffahrtsarchiv, Wissenschaftliches Jahrbuch des Deutschen Schiffahrtsmuseums“, Bremerhaven, Bremerhaven 2018, 39, S. 95 – 144.) (Note: Gerd Hoffmann-Wieck: “Das GEOMAR Helmholtz-Zentrum für Ozeanforschung Kiel und die Geschichte der Kieler Meereskunde.” [“The GEOMAR Helmholtz Centre for Ocean Research Kiel and the history of marine sciences in Kiel”.] In: Auge, O. (ed.): “Christian-Albrechts-Universität zu Kiel: 350 Jahre Wirken in Stadt, Land und Welt.” Karl Wachholtz Verlag, Neumünster 2015, 699-723.)

== Early history ==
Early work in physical/chemical oceanography started with Samuel Reyher, professor at Kiel University, when he published his investigation on salinity in the ice-covered Kiel Fjord in 1697. (Note: Reyher, S. (Samuelis Reyheri, IC. & Mathematici Kiliensis) (1697): Experimentum novum, quo aquae marinae dulcado die VI, Februari anno 1697 examinata desceribetur.[“New experiment, describing the sweetened sea water examined on February 6, 1697.“] Kiliae Holsatorum, Geolog. 443. Sächsische Landesbibliothek - Staats- und Universitätsbibliothek Dresden. http://digital.slub-dresden.de/werkansicht/dlf/14399/5/).) (Note: Gerhard Kortum: “Samuel Reyer (1635-1714) und sein Experimentum Novum.“[“Samuel Reyer (1635-1714) and his Experimentum Novum“] In: Lohff, B., Kortum, G. Kredel, G., Trube, C., Ulrich, J. Wille, P. : “300 Jahre Meeresforschung an der Universität Kiel. Ein historischer Rückblick.” [“300 years of marine research at Kiel University. A historical review.”] Berichte aus dem Institut für Meereskunde, Kiel 1994, 246, 3-12.) Other professors of Kiel University followed with work on marine topics. Johann Nikolaus Tetens (1736-1807) studied tides of the North Sea, (Note: Gerhard Korturn, Karlheinz Paffen: “Das Geographische Institut und die Meeres- und Küstenforschung in Kiel “ [“The geographical institute and the oceanic and coastal research in Kiel“] In: “Kieler Geographische Schriften“, Kiel 1979, 50, S. 104.) (Note: Karlheinz Paffen, Gerhard Korturn: “Die Geographie des Meeres“[“The geography of the sea“] In: “Kieler geographische Schriften“, Kiel 1984, 60, S. 33.) Christoph Heinrich Pfaff (1773-1852) studied hydrographic and chemical conditions in the western Baltic Sea, and Gustav Adolf Michaelis (1798-1848) discussed optical effects in the sea.

Systematic marine research, however, began only later during the 19th century with biological studies, most notably by the zoologist Karl August Möbius (1825-1908), the physiologist Victor Hensen (1835-1924), the marine production biologist Karl Brandt (1854-1931), and the zoologist Wilhelm Friedrich Georg Behn (1808-1878) who participated in the first of the Danish Galathea expeditions (1845-1847). Expeditions in the Baltic and North Seas were performed with Kiel scientists, with S.M.Aviso-Steamer Pommerania (1871, 1872) and later with the freight-steamer Holsatia (1887, 1901/02). The S.M.S. Gazelle of the German Navy Hydrographic Office started from Kiel on an expedition (1874-1876) around the globe. (Note: N/A (1889). "Die Forschungsreise S.M.S. "Gazelle" in den Jahren 1874 bis 1876 unter Kommando des Kapitän zur See Freiherr von Schleinitz. 1.Theil, Der Reisebericht" [The research cruise of S.M.S. „Gazelle" during the years 1874 to1876 under the command of captain Baron von Schleinitz. Part 1, The cruise report] (in German). Humboldt-Universität zu Berlin. doi:10.18452/31.) In Montevideo there was an encounter with the simultaneous Challenger Expedition (1872-1876), with some coordination of stations. (Note: N/A (1889). "Die Forschungsreise S.M.S. "Gazelle" in den Jahren 1874 bis 1876 unter Kommando des Kapitän zur See Freiherrn von Schleinitz. 1.Theil, Der Reisebericht" [The research cruise of S.M.S. „Gazelle" during the years 1874 to1876 under the command of captain Baron von Schleinitz. Part 1, The cruise report, p.283-284] (in German). Humboldt-Universität zu Berlin. doi:10.18452/31.) The Kiel oceanographer Gustav Karsten published the results from the physical measurements of the Gazelle cruise in 1888. The Plankton-Expedition in the Atlantic Ocean on the ’’National’’ in 1889 was the beginning of deep-sea expeditions carried out by Kiel scientists.

Systematic physical and chemical marine studies also started during the second half of the 19th century. Two people need to be acknowledged in particular. The merchant and industrialist Heinrich Adolph Meyer (1822-1889) from Hamburg managed to convene a group united by marine research interests. The physicist Gustav Karsten (1820-1900) from Kiel belonged to this group. A long-term cooperation developed among these two people. Beginning in 1859, Meyer carried out first hydrographic observations in Kiel Fjord and started systematic measurements for the investigation of seasonal changes in the Baltic Sea. (Note: Wolfgang Matthäus: “Germany and the investigation of the Baltic Sea hydrography during the 19th and early 20th century. In: “Meereswissenschaftliche Berichte”, Warnemünde 2010, 83, S. 1 - 105.) Meyer received his honorary doctor from Kiel University in 1866.

A major step was the establishment of the “Prussian Commission for the Scientific Investigation of German Seas in Kiel“ (also called the Kiel Commission; in German: Preußische Kommission zur wissenschaftlichen Untersuchung der deutschen Meere in Kiel). Meyer was a founding member and held the first chair until 1880, with Karsten being his successor until 1896. Möbius and Hensen were also members of the commission. The main objective was the improvement of fisheries. But it became evident soon that this goal could not be reached without an improved knowledge of the hydrography and the development of new approaches and methods. Subsequently the Kiel Commission played an important role in the development of marine sciences in Germany. A "Laboratory for international marine science" (in German: "Laboratorium für die internationale Meeresforschung") was established by the Commission in 1902. Furthermore, the geographer Otto Krümmel became professor at Kiel University in 1883, (Note: Gerhard Kortum, Johannes Ulrich: “Kieler Meeresforschung zur Kaiserzeit: Zum Leben und Werk von Otto Krümmel (1854-1917).” [Marine research in Kiel during the imperial era: on life and work of Otto Krümmel 1854-1917).” In: “Historisch-Meereskundliches Jahrbuch” 2005, 11, 141-156.) strengthening hydrographic work. He wrote the first textbook (2 volumes) on oceanography in German language. (Note: Otto Krümmel: “Handbuch der Ozeanographie“ [“Handbook of Oceanography.“], Vol. 1, 2nd edition, Verlag von Engelhorns, Stuttgart 1907, 526 pp. (First edition: O. Krümmel, 1884).) (Note: Otto Krümmel: “Handbuch der Ozeanographie” [“Handbook of Oceanography.“], Vol. 2, 2nd edition, Verlag von Engelhorns Nachf., Stuttgart 1911, 766 pp.( First edition: G. v. Boguslawski, O. Krümmel, 1887).) The Institute of Zoology and Zoological Museum of Kiel University became the center of marine biological research, led by Adolf Remane (1898-1976) from 1924 to 1934. In addition, Kiel was the home of outstanding scientists and engineers in marine acoustics as part of industry and navy, in particular Alexander Behm (1880-1952), Hugo Lichte (1891-1963) and Karl Heinrich Hecht (1880-1961).

== Institut für Meereskunde ==
Kiel University decided to concentrate marine sciences within an institution of the university, and the Institut für Meereskunde (IfM) was founded in 1937. (Note: Sebastian A. Gerlach, Gerhard Kortum: “Zur Gründung des Instituts für Meereskunde der Universität Kiel 1933 bis 1945.” [On the founding of the Institut für Meereskunde of Kiel University, 1933 -1945] In: “Historisch-Meereskundliches Jahrbuch” 2000, 7, 7-48.) Activities of the former laboratories of the Kiel Commission were included in the new institution. The institute had three departments: Biology, Hydrography and Chemistry, and Geology. In addition to disciplinary work, interdisciplinary approaches took root. Studies in the Baltic Sea were supposed to be in the focus, but not exclusively. A building in Kitzeberg on the eastern shore of Kiel Fjord was provided. Remane was director of the IfM from 1937 to 1944. The marine chemist Hermann Wattenberg (1901-1944) became his successor on May 1, 1944. He perished shortly after the appointment on July 24, 1944, together with eight other members of the institute, when bombs destroyed the institute’s building during World War II.

After the end of the war in 1945, work at the IfM already started again in 1946.Georg Wüst (1890-1977) became Professor of Oceanography and Meteorology at the CAU and Director of the IfM. He had been a scientific leader at the former Institute and Museum of Marine Sciences at Berlin University (in German: “Institut und Museum für Meereskunde (Berlin)“ (Note: Gerhard Kortum: Berlins Bedeutung für die Entwicklung der Geographischen Meereskunde: das Vermächtnis der Georgenstraße.[The significance of Berlin for the development of geographic oceanography: the legacy of the Georgen-Street.” In: Berliner geographische Studien 1987, 25, 133-156.) and had mostly performed research on the circulation of water masses in the global ocean and in particular in the deep Atlantic. In Kiel he succeeded in retrieving several earlier members of the institute, getting the permission to use an old villa on the western shore of Kiel as an institute’s building, obtaining the research cutter “Südfall“ and restarting educational programs. (Note: Georg Wüst, Curt Hoffmann, Carl Schlieper, Rudolf Kändler, Johannes Krey, R. Jaeger: “Das Institut für Meereskunde der Universität Kiel nach seinem Wiederaufbau.“[“The Institute of Marine Sciences of Kiel University after its recovery.“.] In: “Kieler Meeresforschungen” 1956, 22, 127-153.) He began research work in the Baltic Sea with a total staff of 15.

After Wüst’s retirement Günter Dietrich (1911-1972) became his successor. He had been a student at the University of Berlin and had also studied the circulation of water masses in the Atlantic Ocean with Georg Wüst and Albert Defant at the former Berlin institute. Wüst’s and Dietrich’s experience in deep ocean studies strengthened the orientation of the IfM work towards the open and deep ocean, in particular in physical and chemical oceanography. The IfM became the leading marine research institution in West Germany during those years, (Note: Victor K. McElheny: Revival of Oceanography in Germany. In: Science. 1964, 146, S. 45 – 48.) carrying on the scientific legacy of the former Berlin institute in research and education. (Note: Günter Dietrich, Kurt Kalle: “Allgemeine Meereskunde.“ [“General Oceanography”] Borntraeger, Berlin 1957, S. 1-492 (Russian translations: V. Ju. Vespe, Leningrad 1961; N. N. Gorskij, Moskva 1962).) (Note: Günter Dietrich, Kurt Kalle, Wolfgang Krauss, Gerold Siedler: “Allgemeine Meereskunde.“ [“General Oceanography“.] 3. Auflage, Borntraeger, Berlin 1975, S. 1-593.) (Note: Günter Dietrich, Kurt Kalle, Wolfgang Krauss, Gerold Siedler: “General Oceanography.“ 2. Auflage, translated by Susanne und Hans Ulrich Roll, John Wiley & Sons, New York 1980, S. 1-626.) Technically, the successor of the earlier Museum of Marine Sciences in Berlin today is the German Museum of Technology in Berlin.

An important milestone in the IfM’s development was the commission of the new research vessel Meteor (Schiff, 1964), operated jointly by the German Hydrographic Office (see Federal Maritime and Hydrographic Agency of Germany) and the German Research Foundation (see Deutsche Forschungsgemeinschaft. The ship was used by all interested research groups in Germany. The first major expedition 1964/65 to the Red Sea and Indian Ocean was part of the International Indian Ocean Expedition. The German contribution was led by Günter Dietrich and Eugen Seibold, both from Kiel University, and the majority of scientists and technicians were based in Kiel. (Note: Günter Dietrich, Gunther Krause, Eugen Seibold, Kurt Vollbrecht: “Reisebericht der Indischen Ozean Expedition mit dem Forschungsschiff Meteor 1964-1965.” [“Cruise report of the Indian Ocean Expedition on the Research Vessel Meteor 1964-1965.”] In: “Meteor Forschungsergebnisse”, Reihe A, Allgemeines, Physik und Chemie des Meeres 1966, 1, 1-52.) This expedition was the restart of deep-sea oceanography in Kiel.

The financial needs of the IfM were increasing with its tasks and number of personnel, having increased to 124 in the year 1968. (Note: Institut für Meereskunde an der Universität Kiel: “Jahresbericht für das Jahr 1968.” [Annual report for the year 1968.] In: “Kieler Meeresforschungen” 1969, 25, 1, A-3.) In order to obtain additional funding from the federal and other state governments, the IfM joined the group of “blue list” research institutions (see Leibniz Association in 1968. New statutes introduced a collegial system, with the acting director being elected for two-year terms by a panel composed of department heads and employee representatives. Although the funding was no longer related to the university budget, strong ties to the CAU prevailed. Professors were selected jointly by the IfM and the CAU. (Note: Dieter Adelung: Die Geschichte des Instituts für Meereskunde an der Christian Albrechts-Universität zu Kiel. [The history of the Institut für Meereskunde at the Christian Albrecht University in Kiel.] In: Kiel, die Deutschen und die See (Hrsg. Jürgen Elvert, Jürgen Jensen, Michael Salewski), Historische Mitteilungen 1992, Beiheft 3, Steiner Stuttgart, 169-181. ISBN 3-515-06266-1.)

During the following years the IfM became partner in a considerable number of international research programs. A relevant number of IfM scientists worked at foreign research institutions for extended time periods, primarily in the USA. Later a large number of foreign investigators joined the IfM as visiting scientists. The number of employees was increasing steadily.

In the meantime marine geology and geophysics groups had developed parallel to the IfM groups at the CAU. Parts of these activities were combined in the new geoscience institute “Geomar” established in 1987. At the end of 2001 Geomar had 153 members of staff. The staff of the IfM had increased to 252 by that time. (Note: Andreas Villwock (Ed.): “Report 1999-2001.” Institut für Meereskunde an der Universität, 2002, A3-A8.) With the aim of achieving an increasing collaboration of marine disciplines in Kiel, the “IfM” and “Geomar” joined organizationally to form “IFM-GEOMAR” as part of the “Leibniz Association” on January 1, 2004. The new institution had 389 members of staff at its beginning. Due to fiscal considerations, IFM-GEOMAR was transferred to an institution of the Helmholtz Association of German Research Centres on January 1, 2004, thus being primarily funded by the federal government. The name changed to GEOMAR Helmholtz Centre for Ocean Research Kiel.

== Acting directors of the IfM ==
Period	Name	Biographical data
1937-1944	Adolf Remane	*1898 †1976
1944	Hermann Wattenberg	*1901 †1944
1946-1959	Georg Wüst	*1890 †1977
1959-1968	Günter Dietrich	*1911 †1972
1968-1972	Friedrich Defant	*1914 †1990
1972-1976	Gotthilf Hempel	*1929
1976-1978	Gerold Siedler	*1933
1979-1982	Bernt Zeitzschel	*1937
1983-1988	Wolfgang Krauß	*1931 †2009
1989-1990	Jan-C. Duinker	*1934
1991-1994	Dieter Adelung	*1935
1995-1996	Friedrich A. Schott	*1939 †2008
1997-1998	Bernt Zeitzschel	*1937
1999-2000	Peter Lemke	*1946
2001-2003	Jürgen Willebrand	*1941

== Structure of the IfM according to the statutes introduced on May 3, 1968 ==
Department	Department Head (State: 1968)
Regional Oceanography	Günter Dietrich
Theoretical Oceanography	Wolfgang Krauss
Marine Physics	Gerold Siedler
Marine Chemistry	Klaus Grasshoff
Maritime Meteorology	Friedrich Defant
Marine Botany	Fritz Gessner
Marine Zoology	Carl Schlieper
Fisheries Biology	Gotthilf Hempel
Marine Planktology	Johannes Krey
Marine Mikrobiology	Gerhard Rheinheimer

== Research Vessels of the IfM ==
Period	Vessel
1946 – 1966	Research cutter Südfall (1958 renamed Hermann Wattenberg (Schiff))
1966 – 1990	Research ship Alkor
1966 – 1997	Research boat Sagitta
1975 – present	Research ship Littorina (Schiff) (Owned by CAU)
1976 – present	Research ship Poseidon (Schiff, 1976)
1990 – present	Research ship Alkor (Schiff, 1990 (successor)
1997 – heute	Research boat Polarfuchs (Schiff)

In addition to Kiel vessels, the IfM staff frequently used all of the larger research ships available in Germany:Meteor (Schiff, 1964), Meteor (Schiff, 1986), Planet (Schiff, 1967), Sonne (Schiff, 1969), Polarstern (Schiff), Maria S. Merian (Schiff)).

== Participation in major research programs ==
The “German Research Foundation” (Deutsche Forschungsgemeinschaft) supported long-term special research programs (SFBs). IfM scientists participated in several of these SFBs, often in a leadership function:

Period	Number	Name
1971 – 1985	SFB 95	Interaction Sea – Sea Bottom
1980 – 1995	SFB 133	Warm Water Sphere of the Atlantic
1985 - 1998	SFB 313	Changes in the Environment: The Northern North Atlantic
1996 – 2006	SFB 460	Dynamics of Thermohaline Changes in the Circulation

The participation of the IfM in international research programs was of major importance. Among those programs were:

ICES Overflow ’73

ICES International Overflow Expedition 1960 (Note: Günter Dietrich: “The international overflow expedition (ICES) of the Iceland-Faroe Ridge, May–June 1960, a review.” In: “Rapp. Roc. Verb. Cons. Inst. Explor. Mer” 1967, 157, 268-274.)

International Indian Ocean Expedition, IIOE

Joint Air Sea Interaction Study, JASIN

BALTIC 75 Experiment (Note: Klaus Kremling, Harald Petersen: The distribution of Mn, Fe, Zn, Cd and Cu in Baltic seawater; a study on the basis of one anchor station. In: Marine Chemistry 1978, 6.2, 155-170.)

Global Atmospheric Research Program, GARP

GARP Atlantic Tropical Experiment, GATE

First International Biomass Experiment, FIBEX, 1980/81 (Note: Gerhard Stäblein: Historische Aspekte der deutschen geowissenschaftlichen Polarforschung. [Historical aspects of the German geoscientific polar research] In: Polar’forschung 1981, 51 (2), 219-225.)

Joint Global Ocean Flux Study, JGOFS

World Ocean Circulation Experiment, WOCE
