= Karen Heywood =

British physical oceanographer

Karen Heywood OBE FRS
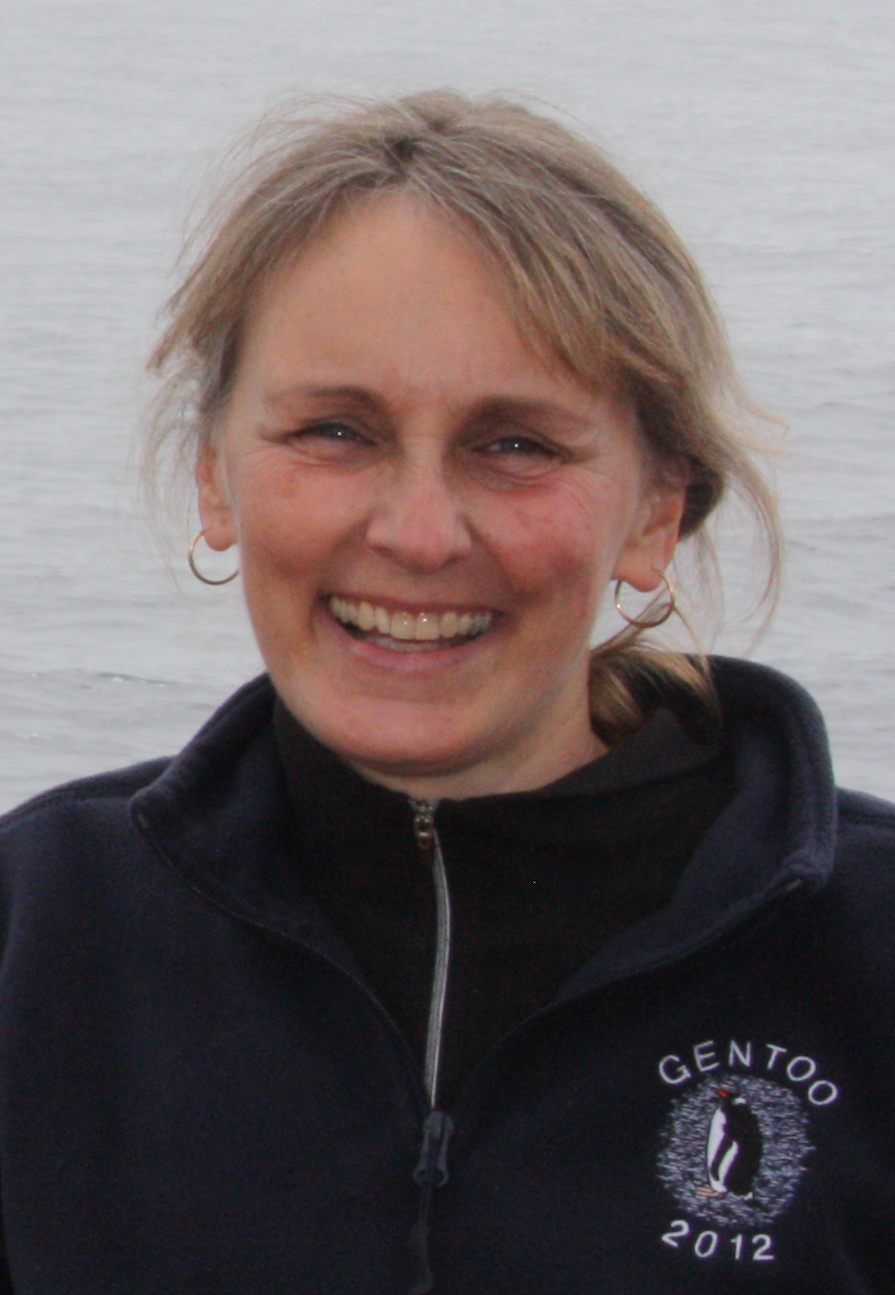
- Born: Karen Joy Heywood
- Education: University of Bristol (BSc); University of Southampton (PhD)
- Awards: Georg Wüst Prize (2009)
- Scientific career
- Fields: Physical oceanography
- Workplaces: University of East Anglia; Bangor University
- Thesis: A Lagrangian study of the diurnal heating of the Upper Ocean (1986)
- Doctoral advisor: Neil Wells
- Website: people.uea.ac.uk/k_heywood

Karen Joy Heywood is a British Antarctic oceanographer and Professor of Physical Oceanography at the University of East Anglia (UEA). She is best known for her work developing autonomous measurements of the Southern Ocean.

== Early life and education ==
Heywood attended the University of Bristol where she was awarded a Bachelor of Science (BSc) degree in Physics followed by a PhD at the University of Southampton where her research investigated the heat budgets of mixed layers.

== Career and research ==
Following her PhD, Heywood was a postdoctoral researcher at Bangor University, working on eddies caused by flow around the Indian Ocean island of Aldabra.

In 1989 Heywood was appointed a lecturer at the University of East Anglia (UEA) in physical oceanography and promoted to professor in 2005, when she became the first female professor of oceanography in the UK. Since then Heywood has trained more than 40 PhD students in a personal mission to increase the number of observational oceanographers in the UK.

During the 1990s Heywood was heavily involved in the World Ocean Circulation Experiment serving as Chief Scientist of the A23 WOCE hydrographic section from Antarctica to Brazil in 1995. This sparked a lasting interest in the Antarctic and Southern Ocean water masses and formation processes, and Heywood has since led several projects in polar regions developing and maintaining a close collaboration with the British Antarctic Survey team.

Heywood has led the field in using autonomous underwater gliders and is currently leading the UEA Seaglider group as well as providing community leadership in observational oceanography and autonomous ocean observing.

She has participated in the following research cruises:

- RRS Discovery 145, North Atlantic, 1984, 1991
- RRS Charles Darwin, Indian Ocean, 1987
- RRS Challenger, North Sea 1988
- RV Wecoma, Eastern Pacific, 1989
- RRS Discovery, South Atlantic, 1993
- RRS James Clark Ross operated by the British Antarctic Survey, Southern Ocean, Nordic Seas, Weddell Sea and Amundsen Sea 1995-2014

Her work was exhibited at the Royal Society summer science fair in 2013.

== Honours and awards ==
Heywood received the Georg Wüst Prize in 2009 for her work in the southern ocean. She was also awarded the Challenger Medal for 2016 in recognition of her major contribution to physical oceanography both in the UK and worldwide; particularly for her contribution to understanding physical oceanographic processes in the Antarctic, for her work in applying novel techniques to understanding ocean processes and for her wider work in developing UK marine science, particularly within SCOR (Scientific Committee for Oceanographic Research).

The Society for Underwater Technology (SUT) presented its 2015 Oceanography Award to Heywood for her outstanding contribution to the field of oceanography. In particular because she was an early advocate for the use of autonomous underwater vehicles (AUVs) as carriers of sensors and samplers in experiments. Her work has used sea gliders in the Antarctic, including under icebergs.

Heywood was named a Fellow of the American Geophysical Union in 2019 and a Fellow of the Royal Society in May 2021.

In 2020 the Heywood Glacier in Antarctica was named after her. It is located at 72°45’S, 61°45’W. The citation says "Glacier about 18 km long and 3 km wide flowing north from the Wegener Range, Palmer Land, to the west of Heezen Glacier, to join Maury Glacier. Named for Professor Karen Heywood (b. 1961), Professor of Physical Oceanography, University of East Anglia. Leader of six oceanographic research cruises to Antarctica since 1995, including Pine Island Bay, the Weddell Sea and the Scotia Sea and a pioneer of the use of autonomous ocean gliders".

Heywood was appointed Officer of the Order of the British Empire (OBE) in the 2022 Birthday Honours for services to oceanography.

In 2026 Heywood was awarded the Royal Society Bakerian Medal and Lecture for her 'outstanding contributions as a physical oceanographer who has documented how the Southern Ocean interacts with the Antarctic continent.'

== Selected publications ==
- Garabato, A.C.N., K.L. Polzin, B.A. King, K.J. Heywood and M. Visbeck, 2004. Widespread intense turbulent mixing in the Southern Ocean. Science, 303 (5655), 210-213. doi:10.1126/science.1090929
- Schmidtko, S., K.J. Heywood, A.F. Thompson and S. Aoki, 2014. Multidecadal warming of Antarctic waters. Science, 346 (6214), 1227-1231. doi:10.1126/science.1256117
- Siddle, E., K.J. Heywood, B.G.M. Webber and P. Bromley, 2021. First measurements of ocean and atmosphere in the Tropical North Atlantic using Caravela, a novel uncrewed surface vessel. Weather, 76 (6), 200-204. doi:10.1002/wea.4004
