= ZMT =

ZMT may refer to:

- Zentrum für Marine Tropenforschung (Centre for Tropical Marine Ecology), Bremen, Germany
- Zomig ZMT, a brand name for a dissolving tablet of zolmitriptan
- Maringarr language of Australia (ISO 639-3 code)
- Masset Airport, British Columbia, Canada (IATA code)
- Zakłady Mechaniczne Tarnów (Tarnów Mechanical Works), a Polish defense industry manufacturer
- Zariski's main theorem in mathematics
