= Defant Bank =

- Submerged bank Defant Bank (Antarctica)
- Interactive map of Defant Bank
- Ocean: Southern Ocean

Defant Bank (76°50′S 31°40′W) is a submarine bank in the Weddell Sea named for Albert Defant (1884–1974), who was both a physician and an oceanographer/geophysicist specializing in tides. The name was proposed by Dr. Heinrich Hinze of the Alfred Wegener Institute for Polar and Marine Research, Bremerhaven, Germany, and was approved by the Advisory Committee for Undersea Features in June 1997.
