= German Meteor expedition =

Oceanographic expedition from 1925 to 1927

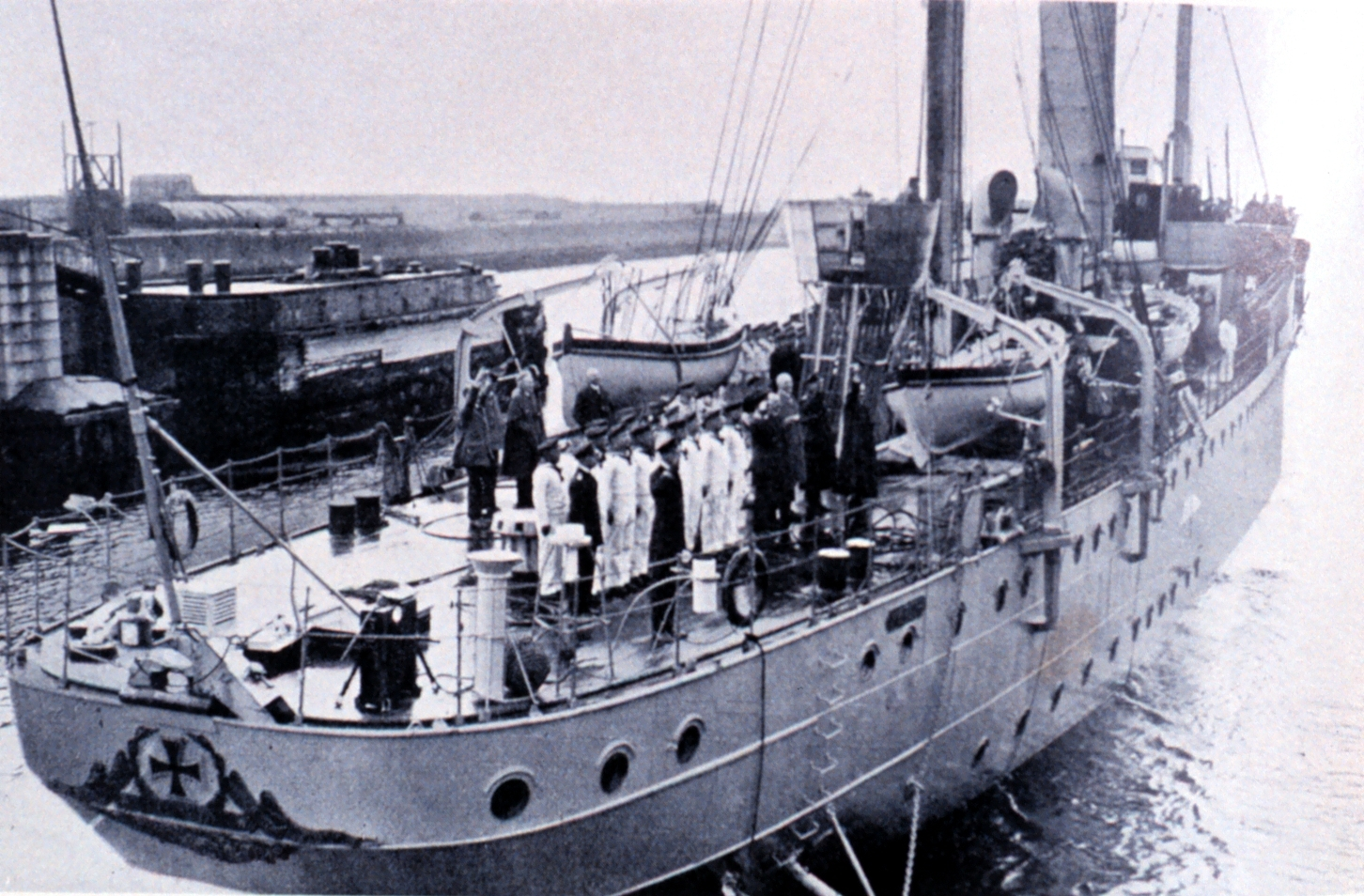
Meteor departing its homeport with full military honors

The German Meteor expedition (German: Deutsche Atlantik Expedition) was an oceanographic expedition that explored the South Atlantic ocean from the equatorial region to Antarctica in 1925–1927, conducting depth soundings, water temperature studies, water samples, studies of marine life and atmospheric observations.

== Expedition ==
The survey vessel Meteor left Wilhelmshaven on 16 April 1925 with the oceanographer Alfred Merz in charge of the expedition.

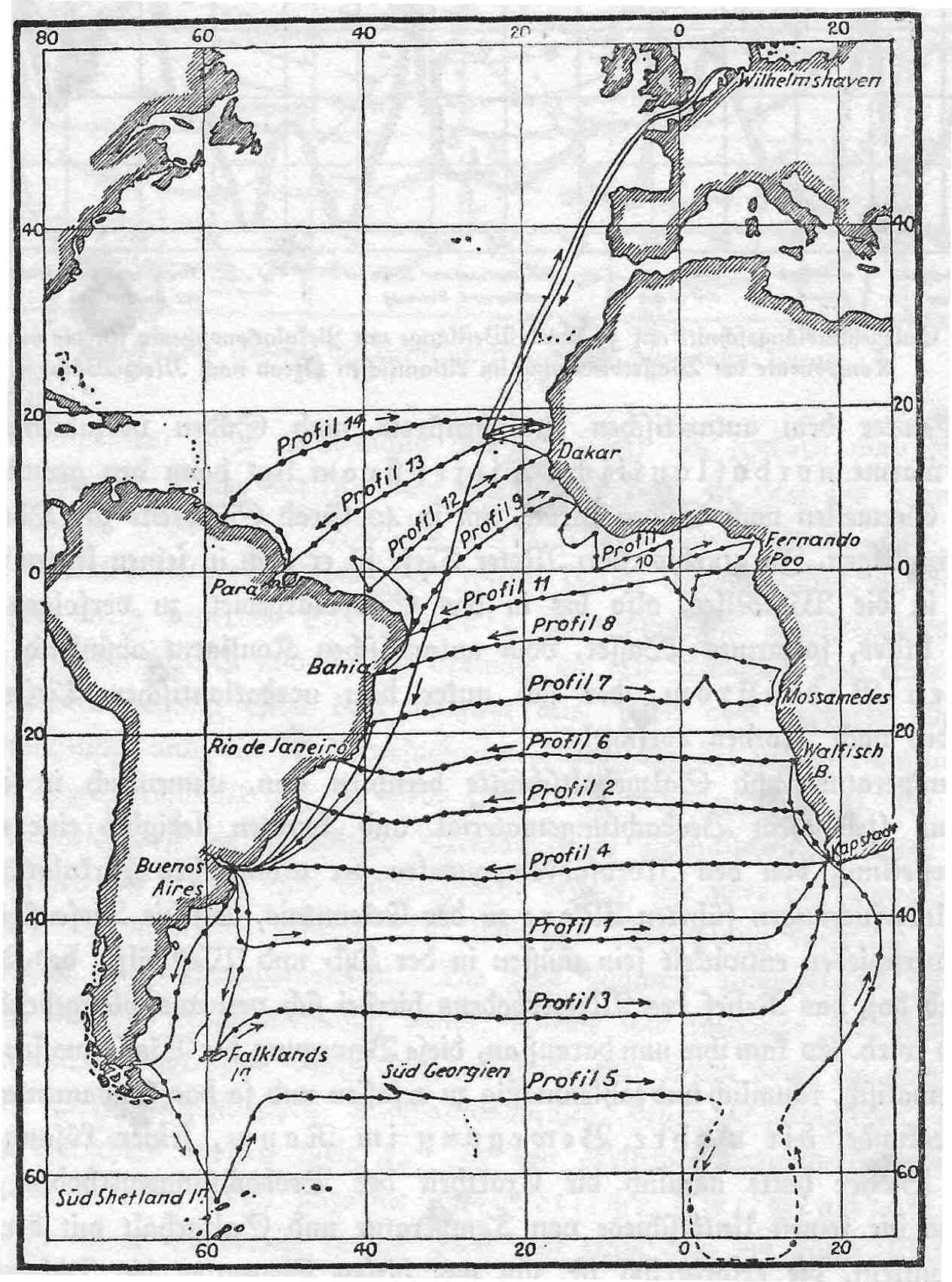
Planned route of the expedition Alfred Merz, 1925

The ship zigzagged between Africa and South America and took echo soundings of the South Atlantic between 20° North and 60° South. In January 1926 the Strait of Magellan was transited; in March the same year a seamount was found and named Meteor Bank (48°16′S 08°16′E).

In June 1926 Merz, who already had health problems before the start of the expedition, was hospitalised at the German Hospital in Buenos Aires. He died of pneumonia on 25 August 1926. The overall lead of the expedition was assumed by the ship's captain Fritz Spieß, while Georg Wüst became chief oceanographer.

The expedition returned to Wilhelmshaven on 2 June 1927. In the course of the venture 67,000 depth soundings were made, more than 67,000 nautical miles (124,000 km; 77,000 mi) were sailed and more than 800 weather balloons were launched.

== Results ==
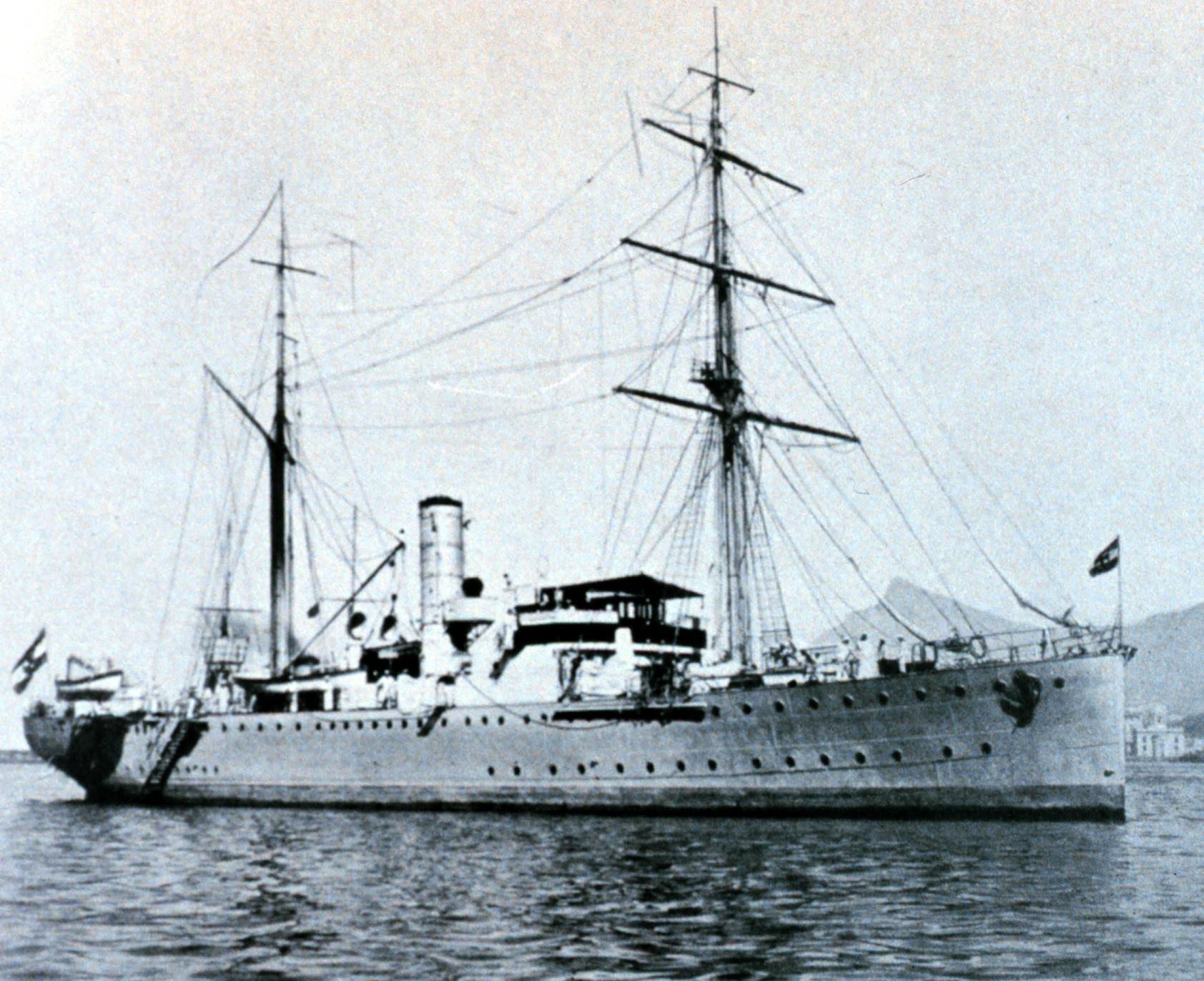
Meteor at sea

Meteor was equipped with early sonar equipment with which it produced the first detailed survey of the south Atlantic Ocean floor. The survey established that the Mid-Atlantic Ridge was continuous through the South Atlantic and continued into the Indian Ocean beyond the Cape of Good Hope.
