= Gotthilf Hempel =

German marine biologist and oceanographer

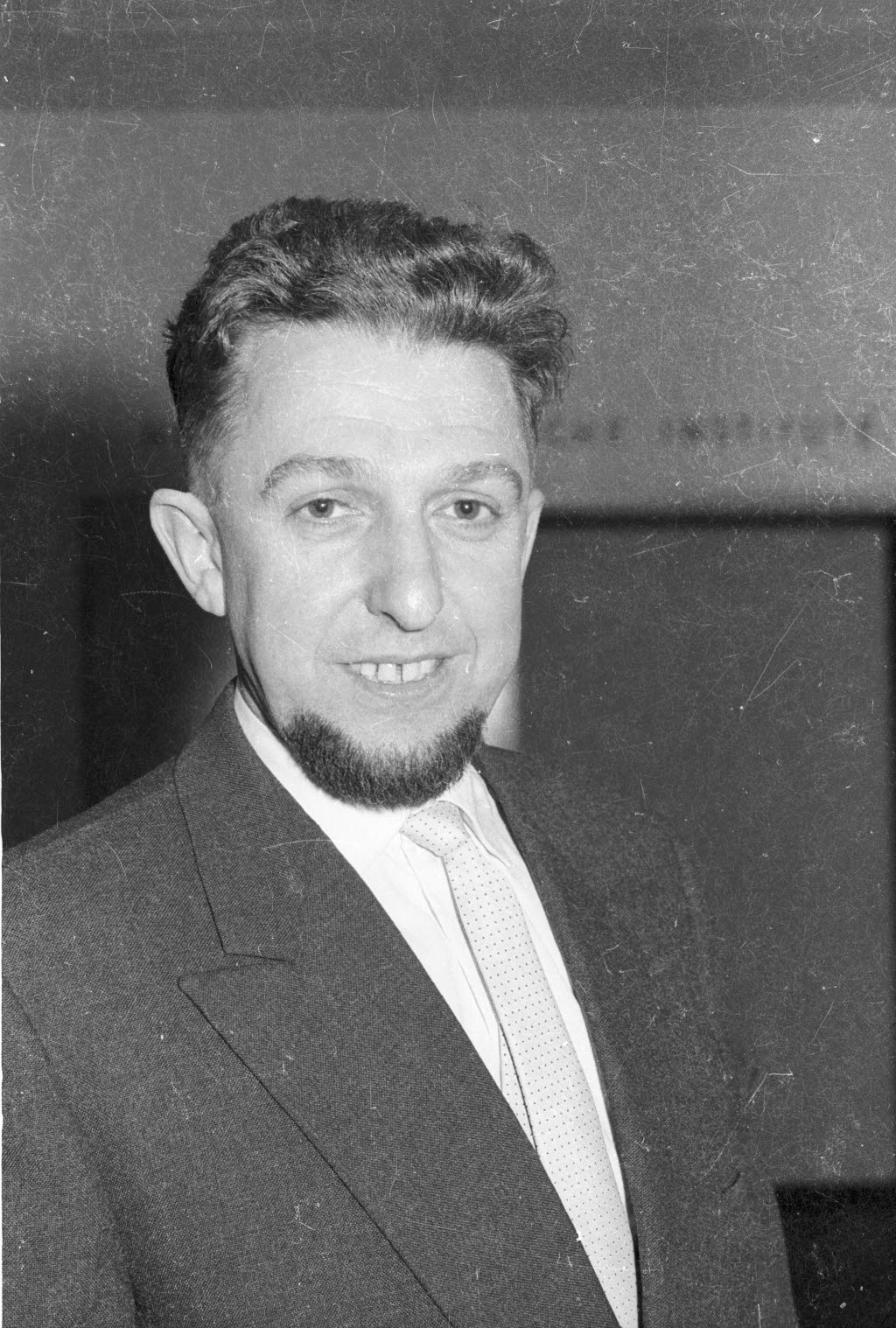
Hempel in 1967

Gotthilf Hempel (born March 8, 1929) is a German marine biologist and oceanographer.

He helped to initiated 1981 the Alfred Wegener Institute for Polar and Marine Research in Bremerhaven and in 1992 of the Leibnitz Center for Tropical Marine Research.

== Live ==
Hempel studied biology and geology at the universities of Mainz and Heidelberg. In 1952 he gained his Ph.D. with a study on the energetics of grasshopper jumps from Heidelberg University. He then went on to work as a scientific assistant at various research institutes in Wilhelmshaven, Heligoland, and Hamburg, where he habilitated with a thesis on the ecology of fry in 1963.

In 1967 he became a professor at the University of Kiel at the Institute of Marine Sciences (Institut für Meereskunde Kiel), where he remained director of the Department of Fisheries Biology for the next 14 years and served as Acting Director of the institute from 1972 to 1976.

In 1981, he helped found the Alfred Wegener Institute for Polar and Marine Research in Bremerhaven whereupon he became the institution's first director. In the same year, he also became director of the Institute for Polar Ecology at the University of Kiel. In Bremerhaven, he initiated the construction of the polar research vessel PFS Polarstern. In 1992, he became the first director of the then newly founded Center for Marine Tropical Ecology at this time part of University of Bremen. Hempel retired in 1994.

He has been interested and active in research politics throughout his career. From 1963 to 1967 he worked for UNESCO and the FAO and from 1990 to 1996 he was a member of the Wissenschaftsrat, the scientific advisory committee of Germany. He has been and is an active proponent of scientific collaboration and education initiatives in underdeveloped countries, and has advocated a more sustainable exploitation of natural resources. Hempel is the editor of the journal Polar Biology, and he has also published several books. He has had more than 70 doctoral candidates, notably Daniel Pauly. From his time spent researching oceanological topics he has managed to spend over 1000 days aboard research vessels.

He became a foreign member of the Royal Netherlands Academy of Arts and Sciences in 1989. He was awarded the German Order of Merit (Grosses Verdienstkreuz) in 1993.

== Selected publications ==
- Early Life History of Marine Fish: The Egg Stage; University of Washington Press; 1980; ISBN 0-295-95672-0.
- Antarctic Science: Global Concerns; Springer 1994; ISBN 0-387-57559-6.
- Nachhaltigkeit und globaler Wandel: guter Rat ist Teuer; Peter Lang Publishing, Frankfurt 2003; ISBN 3-631-50400-4. (Ed.)
