= Albert Defant =

Austrian meteorologist, oceanographer and climatologist

Albert Joseph Maria Defant (July 12, 1884, Trient – December 24, 1974, Innsbruck) was an Austrian meteorologist, oceanographer and climatologist. He published fundamental works on the physics of the atmosphere and ocean and is regarded as one of the founders of physical oceanography.

== Early life and academic work ==
Albert Defant was born in Trient when this was then part of the Austro-Hungarian Empire. Defant went to schools in Trient and Innsbruck and then studied mathematics, physics, and geophysics at the University of Innsbruck in Austria from 1902. He received his PhD at Innsbruck University in 1906 with a thesis on raindrop sizes. He started working at the Zentralanstalt für Meteorologie und Geodynamik (Central Institute for Meteorology and Geodynamics) in Vienna, Austria in 1907. He obtained his Habilitation (degree permitting to teach at the university) at Vienna University in 1909 with a thesis on water level changes of Lake Garda.

Defant stayed at the Zentralanstalt until 1918, working mostly on problems of atmospheric physics, in particular in mountain ranges. He also gained experience in applied weather forecasting. During the later years of that period, he mainly focused on large-scale atmospheric circulation and on water level changes in lakes and adjacent seas, in particular tides and seiches.

The idea that asymmetries were essential to the general circulation received only minor support until Defant (1921) proposed that the motions in middle latitudes were simply a manifestation of turbulence on a very large scale. Defant went beyond Bigelow by applying the results of turbulence theory to estimate the amount of heat that would be transported poleward by turbulent eddies with diameters of thousands of kilometers. He found that this agreed well with the required transport and concluded that his ideas were confirmed.

Defant was Professor of Cosmic Physics (corresponding to meteorology and geophysics) at Innsbruck University from 1919 to 1926. During that time he was able to show that large-scale structures in the atmosphere can provide meridional heat transport from tropical to high latitudes.

By that time he was also rated as an expert on tides, and he was invited to participate in two cruises of the German survey vessel "Panther" in the North Sea in 1925 and 1926. Defant was Professor of Oceanography at the "Friedrich-Wilhelms-Universität" (later Humboldt University) and also Director of the "Institut and Museum für Meereskunde" (Institute and Museum of Marine Science) in Berlin from 1926 to 1945. This institute was the leading institution of marine research in Germany at that time.

The famous German Meteor expedition (1925-1926) had been started in 1925. The chief scientist Alfred Merz unfortunately died in Buenos Aires in 1925, and Albert Defant took over the task of Merz from 1926 to 1927.

His later work in Berlin focused on the physics of the ocean, in particular on the upper ocean and its boundary to the atmosphere. International relations were important for him, particularly to Scandinavian scientists. These contacts were interrupted by World War II. Defant stayed in Berlin until the bomb strikes stopped the scientific work. The institute’s library had been evacuated to Wunsiedel in central Germany, and Defant did some teaching in Vienna and scientific work in Wunsiedel until the end of the war.

The University of Innsbruck (now an Austrian city again) offered him the Chair of Meteorology and Geophysics in 1945, and he was Professor and Director of the Institute for Meteorology and Geophysics at Innsbruck University until 1955. He accepted a visiting appointment at the Scripps Institution of Oceanography of the University of California, San Diego in 1949-1950. He was Rektor (president) of Innsbruck University in 1950-1951.

After his retirement in 1955 he repeatedly worked as visiting professor, during 1952-1956 at the University of Hamburg, Germany, and during 1956-1958 at the Free University of Berlin. Between these stays he was also hosted by the Swedish Meteorological and Hydrological Institute in Stockholm, Sweden, in 1957-1958.

== Family ==
Albert Defant was married to Maria Krepper in 1909, and the couple had three children. The meteorologist Friedrich Defant is his son. His wife died in 1949, and he married Maria Theresia Schletterer in 1952.

== Awards ==
- "Ludwig Haitinger Preis" der Österreichischen Akademie der Wissenschaften, Wien, Österreich ("Haitinger Prize" of the Austrian Academy of Sciences, Vienna, Austria)
- 1917 Österreichisches Verdienstkreuz in Gold, Wien, Österreich (National Decoration in Gold awarded for services to the community, Vienna, Austria)
- 1928 "Alfred Ackermann-Teubner-Gedächtnispreis" zur Förderung der Mathematischen Wissenschaften, Leipzig, Deutschland ("Alfred Ackermann-Teubner Memorial Medal" promoting mathematical sciences, Leipzig, Germany)
- 1932 "Vega-Medaille" der Schwedischen Gesellschaft für Anthropologie und Geographie, Stockholm, Schweden ("Vega Medal" of the Swedish Society for Anthropology and Geography, Stockholm, Sweden)
- 1933 Golden "Alexander Agassiz Medal" of the National Academy of Sciences in Washington, D.C., USA
- 1935 "Galathea Medaillon" of the Royal Danish Geographical Society, Copenhagen, Denmark
- 1943 "Arrhenius-Preis" der Universität Leipzig, Deutschland ("Arrhenius Award" of Leipzig University, Germany)
- 1947 "Honorary Ring" of the Austrian Society of the United Nations League, Vienna, Austria
- 1956 "Emil-Wiechert-Medaille" der Deutschen Geophysikalischen Gesellschaft ("Emil Wiechert Medal" of the German Geophysical Society).
- 1957 Ehrendoktor der Freien Universität Berlin, Deutschland (Honorary Doctor at the Free University of Berlin)
- 1962 Orden "Pour le Mérite für Wissenschaften und Künste" (Order "Pour le mérite for sciences and arts"), Germany
- 1963 "Joachim-Jungius-Medaille", Joachim Jungius-Gesellschaft der Wissenschaften, Hamburg, Deutschland ("Joachim Jungius Medal", Joachim-Jungius Society of Sciences, Hamburg, Germany)
- 1974 "Goldene Jubiläumsmedaille" der Universität Innsbruck, Österreich ("Golden Anniversary Medal", Innsbruck University, Austria)
- 1974 Österreichisches Ehrenzeichen für Wissenschaft und Kunst, Wien, Österreich (Austrian Honorary Medal for Science and Art, Vienna, Austria)
- 1975 (posthum) Golden Honorary Medal of the Oceanographic Society of Japan, Tokyo, Japan

== Honorary memberships ==
- 1926 Naturwissenschaftlich-Medizinischer Verein, Innsbruck, Österreich (Society of Natural Sciences and Medicine, Innsbruck, Austria)
- 1939 Pommersche Geographische Gesellschaft, Greifswald, Deutschland (Pomeranian Geographical Society, Greifswald, Germany)
- 1939 Russische Geographische Gesellschaft, Leningrad, Russland (Russian Geographical Society, Leningrad, Russia)
- 1939 Royal Dutch Geographical Society, Amsterdam, the Netherlands
- 1949 New York Academy of Sciences, New York, USA
- 1956 Deutsche Wissenschaftliche Kommission für Meeresforschung (German scientific commission for marine research)

== Memberships in professional societies ==
- 1919 Deutsche Akademie der Naturforscher Leopoldina (German Academy of Sciences Leopoldina)
- 1935 Preußische Akademie der Wissenschaften, Berlin, Deutschland (Prussian Academy of Sciences, Berlin, Germany)
- 1935 Akademie der Wissenschaften zu Göttingen, Deutschland (Academy of Sciences in Göttingen, Germany)
- 1939 Österreichische Akademie der Wissenschaften, Wien, Österreich (Austrian Academy of Sciences, Vienna, Austria)
- 1939 Royal Academy of Sciences, Göteborg, Sweden
- 1942 Finnish Academy of Sciences, Helsinki, Finland
- 1945 Royal Swedish Academy of Sciences, Stockholm, Sweden
- 1951 Bayerische Akademie der Wissenschaften, München, Deutschland (Bavarian Academy of Sciences, Munich, Germany)
- 1964 Norwegian Academy of Science and Letters, Oslo, Norway
- 1964 Akademie der Wissenschaften und der Literatur Mainz, Deutschland (Academy of Sciences and Literature, Mainz, Germany)

== Bibliography ==
Albert Defant published 222 papers and 12 books. A selection is given in the following.

- Defant, A., 1921. Die Zirkulation der Atmosphäre in den gemäßigten Breiten der Erde (Grundzüge einer Theorie der Klimaschwankungen.) Geografiska Ann. 3, 209-266 (The circulation at mid-latitude zones of the earth).
- Defant, A., 1922. Die meridionale Temperaturverteilung auf der Erde und der Massenaustausch zwischen Äquator und Pol. Meteor. Z. (The meridional distribution of temperature on the earth and the mass exchange between equator and pole).
- Defant, A., 1925. Gezeitenprobleme des Meeres in Landnähe, Probleme der Kosmischen Physik, Bd. 6. H. Grand, Hamburg (Problems of tides of the sea near the land).
- Defant, A., 1926. Wetter und Wettervorhersage. Fr. Deutike, Wien, erste Auflage 1918, zweite Auflage (Weather and weather forecast).
- Defant, A., 1928. Lufthülle und Klima. Enzyklopädie der Erdkunde. FR. Deutike, Wien (Atmosphere and climate).
- Defant, A., 1928 . "Statik und Dynamik der Atmosphäre. In Handbuch der Experimentalphysik, Geophysik, vol.1, Wien und Harms, Leipzig (Statics and dynamics of the atmosphere).
- Defant, A., 1928 (korr. 1931). "Physik des Meeres". In Handbuch der Experimentalphysik, Geophysik, Band 2, Wien und Harms, Leipzig (Physics of the sea).
- Defant, A., 1929. Dynamische Ozeanographie. - Einführung in die Geophysik, Bd. 3. J. Springer, Berlin (Dynamic oceanography).
- Defant, A., 1932. Ebbe und Flut des Meeres. In: "Meereskunde. Sammlung volkstümlicher Vorträge", Institut für Meereskunde, Berlin, Band 18, 7, Heft 203 (Ebb and high tide of the sea).
- Defant, A., 1936. Schichtung und Zirkulation des Atlantischen Ozeans - Die Troposphäre. Wiss.Ergebn. Deutsch. Atlant. Exp. "Meteor" 1925 - 27, Bd. VI.(1), Lfg. 3, Berlin.

Translated by Emery, W.J., 1981. Stratification and Circulation of the Atlantic Ocean - The Troposphere. Scientific Results of the German Atlantic Expedition of the Research Vessel "Meteor" 1925 – 27, Vol.VI, Part 1, Al-Ahram Center for Scientific Translations, Cairo.

- Defant, A., Böhnecke, G., und Wattenberg, H., 1936. Die ozeanographischen Arbeiten des Vermessungs-Schiffes "Meteor" in der Dänemarkstraße und in der Irmingersee in den Jahren 1929, 1930, 1933 und 1935. l. Teil. Veröff. d. Inst. f. Meereskunde, Berlin (The oceanographic work of the survey ship „Meteor“ in the Denmark Strait and the Irminger Sea during the years 1929, 1930, 1933 and 1935).
- Defant, A., Hg. mit Hans Frebold, 1942. Der Einfluss des Reflexionsvermögens von Wasser und Eis auf den Wärmeumsatz der Polargebiete. Reihe: Veröffentlichungen des Deutschen Wissenschaftlichen Instituts DWI zu Kopenhagen. Reihe 1: Arktis. Nr. 5 Gebrüder Borntraeger, Berlin (The influence of the reflectivity of water and ice on the heat budget of polar regions).
- Defant, A., 1943. Die Gezeiten der festen Erde, des Meeres und der Atmosphäre. - Preuß. Akad. d. Wissenschaften, Vorträge u. Schriften H. 10 (The tides of the solid earth, the sea and the atmosphere).
- Defant, A., 1951. Die Geophysik und ihre Stellung im Rahmen der übrigen Naturwissenschaften. — Rektorinaugurationsrede, Universität Innsbruck (Geophysics and its rank among the other natural sciences).
- Defant, A., 1953. Ebbe und Flut des Meeres, der Atmosphäre und der Erdfeste. Verständliche Wissenschaft, Bd. 49. Springer-Verlag, Berlin u. Heidelberg 1953, 2. Aufl. (Ebb and high tide of the sea, the atmosphere and the solid earth).
- Defant, A., 1957. Flutwellen und Gezeiten des Wassers. In Encyclopedia of Physics, vol. 48, Geophysics II. Springer-Verlag, Berlin und Heidelberg (Tidal waves and tides of the water).
- Defant, A., F. Defant, 1957. Atmosphärische Dynamik. Akademische Verlagsgesellschaft, Frankfurt a. M. (Atmospheric dynamics).
- Defant, A., Defant, F., 1958. Physikalische Dynamik der Atmosphäre, Akademische Verlagsgesellschaft, Frankfurt, 527 p. (Physical dynamics of the atmosphere).
- Defant, A., 1960. Ebb and Flow. In Ann Arbor Sciences Library, The University Press of Michigan, first edition 1958, second edition.
- Defant, A., 1961. Physical Oceanography. Pergamon Press, New York, London, Paris, Vol.II, 1960, Vol.I.

== See also ==
- Defant Bank
