= Alfred Merz =

Austrian geographer and oceanographer (1880–1925)

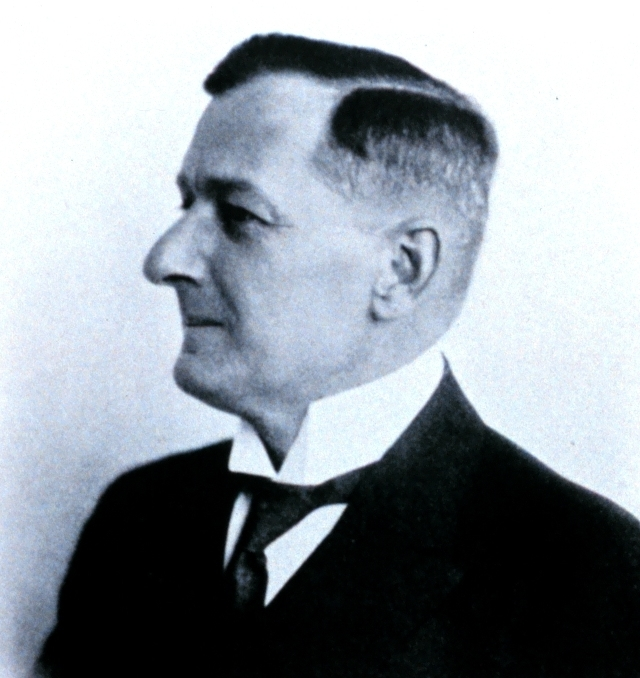
- Born: 24 January 1880; Perchtoldsdorf, Lower Austria, Austria
- Died: 16 August 1925 (aged 45); Buenos Aires, Argentina
- Education: University of Vienna
- Scientific career
- Fields: Geography, oceanography
- Workplaces: Institute of Marine Science, Berlin

Signature
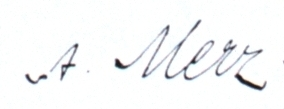

Alfred Merz (24 January 1880 – 16 August 1925) was an Austrian geographer, oceanographer and director of the Institute of Marine Science in Berlin. He died of pneumonia in Buenos Aires while on an expedition to survey the South Atlantic and is buried in Perchtoldsdorf. Merz Peninsula is named after him.

== Literary works ==
- Hydrographische Untersuchungen im Golf von Triest, 1911
- Die Oberflächentemperatur der Gewässer, 1920
- Die atlantische Vertikalzirkulation, 1922-1933 (with Georg Wüst)

=== Other readings ===
- Writings about exploration with the German research vessel Meteor, completed by Albert Josef Maria Defant
