= RV Meteor (1986) =

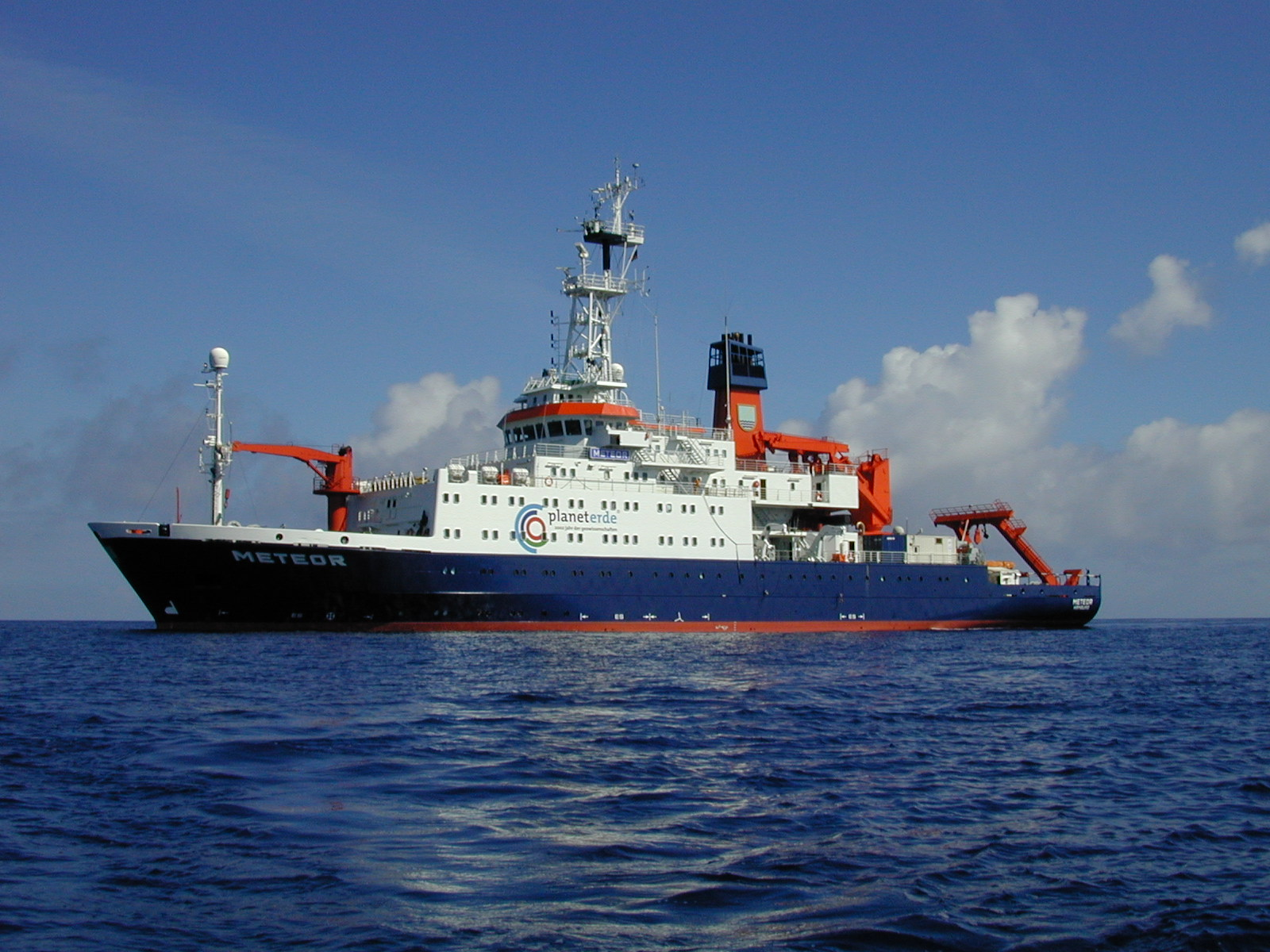
- RV Meteor

History

Germany
- Name: Meteor
- Owner: Federal Ministry of Education and Research (Germany)
- Operator: Briese Schiffahrts GmbH
- Port of registry: Germany
- Builder: Schlichting-Werft, Travemünde, Germany
- Launched: September 3, 1985
- Home port: Hamburg
- Identification: IMO number: 8411279; Call sign: DBBH; MMSI number: 211206980
- Status: Active as of 2018

General characteristics
- Class & type: Research vessel
- Length: 97.5 m (319 ft 11 in)
- Beam: 16.5 m (54 ft 2 in)
- Draught: 5.61 m (18 ft 5 in)
- Installed power: 2 x 1,150 kW (1,540 hp) electrical engines
- Propulsion: Diesel-electrical system
- Speed: 11.5 knots (21.3 km/h; 13.2 mph)
- Crew: 33 + 30 scientists

RV Meteor (also Meteor III) is a multidisciplinary research vessel operating mainly on the high sea. She is owned by the German state represented by its Federal Ministry of Education and Research and registered in Hamburg.

Meteor operates mainly in the areas of the Atlantic, the eastern Pacific, and the western Indian Oceans, as well as the Mediterranean and the Baltic Seas. The current Meteor is the third German research vessel in a row sharing the same name, after Meteor and RV Meteor (1964).

Until 2012, Meteor was operated by Bremerhaven based company F. Laeisz GmbH. Since January 2013 the ship has a new operator, Briese Schiffahrt in Leer. It can accommodate up to 30 scientists for work in 20 laboratories on the main deck.

A new ship named Meteor was ordered at Meyer Werft and Fassmer in 2022 to replace the Meteor and the Poseidon, which has already been retired, in 2026. The Keel was laid on 11 July 2023 at Neptun Werft, Rostock. The ship is going to be completed at Meyer Werft, Papenburg. The hull was trowed from Rostock to Emden by the Tugs 'VB Bremerhaven' and 'VB Roennbeck' to Emden. On 10 August around noon, the section left Emden towed by the Radbod at the bow and the Gruno IV at the aft, followed by the Gruno 2, towards Papenburg.
