= Frank Hagar Bigelow =

American scientist

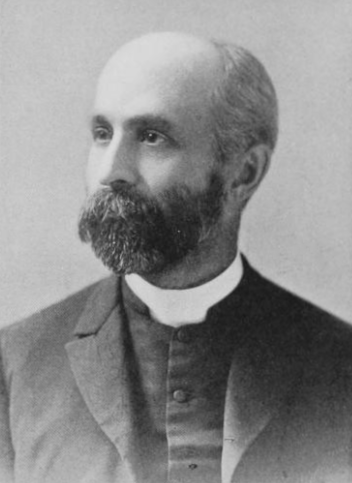
- Born: August 28, 1851; Concord, Massachusetts, US
- Died: March 2, 1924 (aged 72); Vienna, Austria
- Education: Boston Latin School; Harvard College; Episcopal Theological School
- Occupations: Scientist, priest
- Spouse: Mary Ellen Spalding (m. 1881)

Frank Hagar Bigelow (August 28, 1851 – March 2, 1924) was an American scientist and Episcopal priest.

== Biography ==
Frank Hagar Bigelow was born in Concord, Massachusetts on August 28, 1851. His mother took an interest in astronomy, and her involvement caught his interest. Bigelow was educated at the primary and high school in Concord, in the Boston Latin School, Harvard College (graduated 1873), and at the Episcopal Theological School in Cambridge, Massachusetts, and entered orders. For some years he was assistant astronomer in the Argentine National Observatory in Cordoba. This service (1873–1876; 1881–1883) was interrupted for his theological studies, and for the short time (1880–1881) after entering orders he was a rector in Natick, Massachusetts.

He married Mary Ellen Spalding on October 6, 1881.

Later he was professor of mathematics in Racine College, Wisconsin, assistant in the National Almanac office in Washington, D.C., and in 1891 he became professor of meteorology in the United States Weather Bureau in Washington. He was also an assistant rector of St. John's Church in Washington.

He died in Vienna, Austria, on March 2, 1924.

== Work ==
Bigelow's name is especially associated with an instrument for the photographic record of the transit of stars and with some novel studies by which the solar corona, the aurora, and terrestrial magnetism are shown to be associated. The theories met with a favorable reception in scientific circles.

=== Tornadic formula ===
In 1901 and later again in 1906, Bigelow, as chief of the United States Weather Bureau, calculated and published formulas to find the rotational speed of a tornado based on the height above sea level. In his study, Bigelow studied a waterspout off the coast of Cottage City, Massachusetts. Bigelow's formula went on to help Alfred Wegener, a leading geophysicist, atmospheric scientist, and an Arctic explorer, develop the hypothesis that tornadoes can form off of a gust front.

Bigelow's Formula
Height above sea level (ft)	Diameter of tube (ft)	Radial velocity outward (mph)	Rotational velocity (mph)	Vertical velocity upwards (mph)
4,200 ft (1,300 m)	–	–	–	–
4,198 ft (1,280 m)	3,402 ft (1,037 m)	7.0 mph (11.3 km/h)	14.1 mph (22.7 km/h)	0.04 mph (0.064 km/h)
3,901 ft (1,189 m)	506 ft (154 m)	1.0 mph (1.6 km/h)	94.4 mph (151.9 km/h)	2.50 mph (4.02 km/h)
3,599 ft (1,097 m)	400 ft (120 m)	0.6 mph (0.97 km/h)	119.5 mph (192.3 km/h)	3.90 mph (6.28 km/h)
3,301 ft (1,006 m)	290 ft (88 m)	0.6 mph (0.97 km/h)	164.0 mph (263.9 km/h)	7.40 mph (11.91 km/h)
2,999 ft (914 m)	250 ft (76 m)	0.5 mph (0.80 km/h)	189.0 mph (304.2 km/h)	9.90 mph (15.93 km/h)
2,898 ft (883 m)	204 ft (62 m)	0.4 mph (0.64 km/h)	233.0 mph (375.0 km/h)	14.90 mph (23.98 km/h)
1,802 ft (549 m)	178 ft (54 m)	0.4 mph (0.64 km/h)	268.0 mph (431.3 km/h)	19.80 mph (31.87 km/h)
1,499 ft (457 m)	168 ft (51 m)	0.3 mph (0.48 km/h)	284.0 mph (457.1 km/h)	22.20 mph (35.73 km/h)
1,201 ft (366 m)	158 ft (48 m)	0.3 mph (0.48 km/h)	300.0 mph (482.8 km/h)	24.70 mph (39.75 km/h)
601 ft (183 m)	144 ft (44 m)	0.3 mph (0.48 km/h)	328.0 mph (527.9 km/h)	29.60 mph (47.64 km/h)
479 ft (146 m)	144 ft (44 m)	0.3 mph (0.48 km/h)	333.0 mph (535.9 km/h)	29.70 mph (47.80 km/h)
0 ft (0 m)	134 ft (41 m)	0.3 mph (0.48 km/h)	354.0 mph (569.7 km/h)	34.60 mph (55.68 km/h)

== Writing ==
Bigelow edited the Monthly Weather Review (1909–10). He published many articles on the subjects of his work and a monograph on the “Solar Corona,” published by the Smithsonian Institution (1889). His later writings were devoted to an isolated effort to reform meteorology through his publications. This bore little or no fruit.
