= Hugo Lichte =

German physicist

Hugo Lichte (11 April 1891 in de:Mengede, Germany − 27 July 1963 in Berlin, Germany) was a German physicist. He did pioneering work on the theory of sound propagation in the ocean and was a leading developer of motion picture technology during the transition from silent to sound film.

== Life ==
Hugo Lichte studied mathematics, physics and chemistry at the University of Göttingen from 1909 to 1913. (Note: Helmut Mielert: Lichte, Hugo. In: Neue Deutsche Biographie. 1985, S. 448 f. Access12 April 2019.) He then joined the scientific staff of the “Torpedoinspektion Kiel” of the Imperial German Navy until 1919. After the end of World War I he worked at the “Signal GmbH” in Kiel and then in Berlin, starting in 1924 at the de:Mix & Genest AG and in 1926 at the AEG.When the research institute of the AEG was founded in 1928 under the leadership of Carl Ramsauer, he was appointed head of the electro-acoustic department in Berlin. After the end of World War II he became a teacher at the de:Lilienthal-Gymnasium (Berlin-Lichterfelde) in Berlin until 1959. In addition he was a lecturer of physics at the Free University of Berlin from 1949.

== Work and achievements ==
Lichte promoted the understanding of physical processes and related technical developments mainly in two fields: marine acoustics. (Note: Peter C. Wille: "Sound images of the ocean in research and monitoring" 2005, Springer, Berlin, p. 15.) and sound film technology

He presented his pioneering work on the theory of sound propagation in the layered ocean in 1919. (Note: Hugo Lichte: Über den Einfluß horizontaler Temperaturschichtung des Seewassers auf die Reichweite von Unterwasserschallsignalen. In: Physikalische Zeitschrift. 1919, 20 (17), 385–389. Access 12 April 2019.) (Note: Hugo Lichte: On the influence of horizontal temperature layers in sea water on the range of underwater sound signals. In: Tracer Science & Systems. Übersetzt von A.F. Wittenborn. Access 12 April 2019.) (Note: Albert E. Theberge: The Discovery of Long-Distance Sound Transmission in the Ocean - The Deep Sound Channel. Access 12 April 2019.) In his paper he was able to show that decreasing temperature and increasing pressure with depth lead to a minimum of sound velocity at mean depth. The resulting sound refraction patterns induce largely enhanced ranges of sound propagation. Urick (Note: R. J. Urick: Sound propagation in the sea. In: Defense Advanced Research Projects Agency. US Government Printing Office, Washington, D.C. 1979, 20402. 1, 1–1. Access 12.April 2019.) commented: “This paper was far ahead of its time, and is an indication of the highly advanced state of German physics in the early years of this century.“

In his later work at the AEG research institute he was a leader in the development of sound technology, in particular the techniques for the transition from silent to sound movies and for sound recognition. (Note: F. Hehlgans, H. Lichte: "Aufnahme und Wiedergabe von Musik und Sprache bei Tonfilmen". In: "Petersen W. (eds), Forschung und Technik". 1930, Springer, Berlin, Heidelberg (Recording and playback of music and voice for sound films).) (Note: W. Bürck, P. Kotowsky, H. Lichte: "Der Aufbau des Tonhöhenbewußtseins" in: "Elektrische Nachrichten Technik" 12, pp. 326–333 (The setup of sound recognition).) (Note: W. Bürck, P. Kotowsky, H. Lichte(1935a): "Hörbarkeit von Laufzeitdifferenzen" in: "Elektrische Nachrichten Technik" 1935,12, 355 ff (Audibility of signal propagation time differences).) (Note: Hugo Lichte, Albert Narath: "Physik und Technik des Tonfilms" 1943, 411 pp. Leipzig, Verlag S. Hirzel (Physics and technology of sound film).) (Note: Friedrich-Wilhelm Hagemeyer: Die Entstehung von Informationskonzepten in der Nachrichtentechnik - Eine Fallstudie zur Theoriebildung in der Technik in Industrie- und Kriegsforschung. Dissertation, Berlin 1979, S. 272. Website weisses-rauschen.de. Access 26 April 2019.)

== Awards and honors ==
Oskar-Messter-Medal (in German: de:Oskar-Messter-Medaille) 1961 of the “Deutsche Kinotechnischen Gesellschaft“, from 1972 de:Fernseh- und Kinotechnische Gesellschaft) (Society for the Technology of Television and Cinema).

Lichtestrasse (Lichte Street) in Kiel was named in memory of Hugo Lichte on 16 February 2006.
