= Leibniz Centre for Tropical Marine Research =

Research institution of the Leibniz Association

Coordinates: 53°06′28″N 8°50′45″E

Leibnitz Center for Tropical Marine Research
- Leibnitz Zentrum für Marine Tropenforschung
- Type: Non-profit
- Established: 1991
- Founder: Gotthilf Hempel
- Affiliations: Leibniz Association
- Budget: 13.000.000 Euro (2023)
- President: Raimund Bleichschwitz (CEO)
- Location: Bremen, Bremen, Germany
- Website: zmt-bremen.de

The Leibniz-Zentrum für Marine Tropenforschung (ZMT) (Leibniz Centre for Tropical Marine Research) in Bremen is a German institute for research and developments for tropical and subtropical coastal areas and ecosystems.

ZMT is the only scientific institute in Germany that exclusively investigates this ecosystems and their significance for nature and humans in an interdisciplinary approach. The mission of ZMT is to provide a scientific basis for the protection and sustainable use of tropical coastal ecosystems by conducting research, capacity development and consulting activities in close cooperation with national and international partners in the tropics.

The centre was founded as research institute affiliated with the University of Bremen in 1991. It is a participating member of MARUM. Since 2009 ZMT is an independent research institute and member of the Gottfried Wilhelm Leibniz Scientific Community. ZMT is also a member of the Deutsche Allianz für Meeresforschung (German Alliance for Marine Research). ZMT houses a scientific diving centre and laboratories such as the Marine Experimental Ecology Facility (MAREE).

== Background ==
Coral reefs, mangrove forests and seagrass meadows as well as rivers, estuaries, coastal waters and upwelling areas comprise some of the most important tropical coastal ecosystems. They are in close physical, biological and geochemical interaction as transitional areas between land and water and host high biodiversity. However, climate change, overexploitation of resources, population increase, and urbanisation profoundly alter these ecosystems. These developments impact social-ecological and socio-economic structures and confront society with the need for sustainable management of coastal ecosystems. Tropical coasts are particularly vulnerable to transformations in their morphology, ecological conditions, and societal dynamics.

Facing these challenges requires a holistic view that encompasses entire social-ecological systems in their complexity. Research at ZMT, therefore, spans across various disciplines and methodologies in natural and social sciences, and involves transdisciplinary stakeholders at science-to-policy and science-to-practice interfaces. This approach can be regarded as a unique feature of ZMT.

ZMT addresses societal issues, particularly the ongoing use of ecosystem services and the protection of ecosystems along the populated and developing tropical coasts. Active partnerships with academic institutions and actors from civil society, industry, and policy in the tropics form a transregional research network of scientific, technical, and societal expertise. Based on its research activities, ZMT advises policy- and decision-makers with regard to mitigation and adaptation strategies. In accordance with the credo of the Leibniz Association theoria cum praxi, ZMT's emphasis ranges from fundamental research to problem-oriented applied research. Combining research with capacity development in the field of scientific expertise and ecosystem management, ZMT conducts research projects with partners in tropical countries that contribute to a scientific basis for implementing coastal zone management strategies.

== History ==
In 1992, the Free Hanseatic City of Bremen founded the Center for Tropical Marine Ecology (ZMT) at University of Bremen. The initiator and founding director was Gotthilf Hempel, who in 1980 already successfully founded the Alfred Wegener Institute for Polar and Marine Research (AWI) in Bremerhaven. Venugopalan Ittekkot succeeded Gotthilf Hempel and guided ZMT for more than 10 years. ZMT expanded steadily, and became a member of the Leibniz Association in 2009. At this time the institute was dedicated to research and training exclusively for the protection and sustainable use of tropical coastal ecosystems and their resources. ZMT runed long-term projects in South America and Southeast Asia supported by the BMBF.

In 2010, Hildegard Westphal was appointed as new scientific director at ZMT and expanding the disciplinary spectrum and the size considerably. In addition, Nicolas Dittert joined the ZMT leadership in 2017 with the new additional position of Administrative Director.

The institute was restructured in 2010/2011 and since then consists of four scientific departments and one infrastructure department. At the beginning of 2017, ZMT changed its name from Leibniz Center for Tropical Marine Ecology to Leibniz Centre for Tropical Marine Research.

In 2017, the ZMT was represented for the first time at side events with lectures and in discussion panels at the 23rd Conference of the Parties to the Framework Convention on Climate Change (COP23) in Bonn. The ZMT also had observer status at the conference. ZMT was accused of self-censorship and falsifying scientific articles and publication lists. Frankfurter Allgemeine Zeitung and DUZ reported, there were complaints from China in the run-up to the conference because of the mention of Taiwan on the ZMT homepage. The institute management then falsified the title of a scientific paper and added “Taiwan, Province of China”. To no jeopardize accreditation for the conference, the scientific director of the institute Hildegard Westphal, ordered to delete parts of the titles of scientific articles, associated publication lists and pages from the institute's homepage.

ZMT also hosts the Future Earth Coasts (FEC) office, a global network of experts investigating the drivers of global change in coastal zones has been at ZMT from 2019 to 2021.

In 2020 the economist Raimund Bleichschwitz became director of ZMT.

In 2022 ZMT decided to build a new ZMT-building and decided in 2023 for a Architektur from Vienna with almost 6,500 square metres for 34.8 million euros. The German Federal Government and the State of Bremen will share financing.

== Research Practice ==
ZMT has the overarching vision to contribute to enabling people in tropical coastal regions to live healthy, self-determined, and safe lives that offer them positive perspectives in terms of education and personal development. ZMT operationalises its vision across the three pillars of its mission by:

- conducting empirical research in the field and the laboratory, as well as data analyses at ZMT;
- supporting the development of academic structures in tropical coastal countries;
- collecting, evaluating, and providing research data to the scientific community, as well as to policy- and decision-makers and the public;
- offering academic training, in particular for doctoral candidates;
- providing advice to industry, policy, and civil society in the field of sustainable use of tropical coastal ecosystems; and
- supporting the formation of South-South networks as a contact hub.

== Teaching and Training ==
ZMT scientists teach at German Universities with which ZMT joint professors are affiliated mainly with the University of Bremen, but also the Constructor University, the University of Oldenburg, and Kiel University.

In cooperation with the University of Bremen, ZMT offered the international Master's programme ISATEC. It was taught in English and was interdisciplinary in scope. The master existed from 1999 to 2021. ZMT has no own master-programme anymore but is participating in the Master-programme Marine Biology of University of Bremen along with other institutes since.

== Working Areasz ==
ZMT is organised in four scientific departments: (1) Biogeochemistry and Geology, (2) Ecology, (3) Social Sciences, and (4) Theoretical Ecology and Modelling, complemented by a (5) Research Infrastructure Department, and the Science Management. The scientific departments are composed of 20 working groups and junior working groups. In order to facilitate the interdisciplinary work, ZMT activities are structured in cross-cutting programme areas, forming a matrix across the departments. Departments and working groups:

=== 1. Biogeochemistry and Geology (Nils Moosdorf (interim)) ===
- WG Geoecology and Carbonate Sedimentology (Hildegard Westphal, Marleen Stuhr)
- WG Submarine Groundwater Discharge (Nils Moosdorf)
- WG Carbon and Nutrient Cycling (Tim Rixen)
- WG Ecological Biogeochemistry (Tim Jennerjahn)

=== 2. Ecology (Martin Zimmer) ===
- WG Mangrove Ecology (Martin Zimmer)
- WG Experimental Aquaculture (Andreas Kunzmann)
- WG Fisheries Biology (Martin Zimmer)
- WG Reef Systems (Sonia Bejarano)

=== 3. Global Change Impacts and Social-ecological Responses (Achim Schlüter) ===
- WG Institutional and Behavioral Economics (Achim Schlüter)
- WG Development and Knowledge Sociology (Achim Schlüter)
- WG Social-ecological Systems Analysis (Marion Glaser)
- WG Deliberation, Valuation and Sustainability (Marie Fujitani, junior working group)

=== 4. Theoretical Ecology and Modeling (Jan Haerter) ===
- WG Complexity and Climate (Jan Haerter)
- WG Systems Ecology (Agostino Merico)
- WG Resource Management (Jan O. Härter)
- WG Spatial Ecology and Interactions (Hauke Reuter)
- WG Data Science and Technology (Arjun Chennu)

== Collaborations ==
The main asset of ZMT lies in the systematic dialogue between key disciplines necessary for a holistic assessment of coastal and marine resources and their use as well as sustainable governance in the tropics. The ZMT approach relies on consistent, transparent, and respectful collaboration and shared responsibilities with its worldwide partners in tropical countries based on mutual trust and respect. ZMT conducts this alliance in a transparent manner and on an equal footing to cultivate debates and to provide the intellectual foundation for action from a scientific perspective. This manifesto was formalised in the Bremen Criteria, developed by ZMT in 1991, and updated in 2015, creating the basis for the planning, development and structure of ZMT’s projects.

== Equipment and Infrastructure ==
The ZMT has several chemical and biological laboratories as well as seawater testing facilities for experiments and the evaluation of samples taken in the field. In 2011, ZMT commissioned its extended marine aquarium system MAREE (MARine Experimental Ecology) which has 24 mesocosms. The facility can be used to design supplementary laboratory experiments under controlled conditions. MAREE has five independent water circuits and a total of more than 60 maintenance aquariums for carrying out scientific experiments. The laboratory is equipped so that a number of environmental conditions such as temperature, nutrient and light availability as well as pH and water flow can be adopted. ZMT hosts a research diving facility established in 2013. It is accredited to undertake training for gaining the certificate of a German Research Diver. It is the only facility in Germany training for tropical waters. The ZMT office for Knowledge exchange was established by chief Westphal in 2014 and aims to support and facilitate stakeholder exchange with non-scientific partners, industry collaboration, and networking activities.

== Financing and Organization ==
ZMT is organised and financed within the framework of the Leibniz Association by the Federal Government and the states. In addition, third-party funds (Drittmittel) are raised, including financing through German Research Association (DFG), the EU and the ERC, the German Federal Ministry of Education and Research (BMBF), for Economic Cooperation and Development (BMZ), for Environment, Nature Conservation, and Nuclear Safety (BMU), and other German ministries, as well as development agencies and banks (e.g. GIZ, KfW), and in cooperation with companys and other organisations.

== Website ==
- Official website
