= German survey ship Meteor =

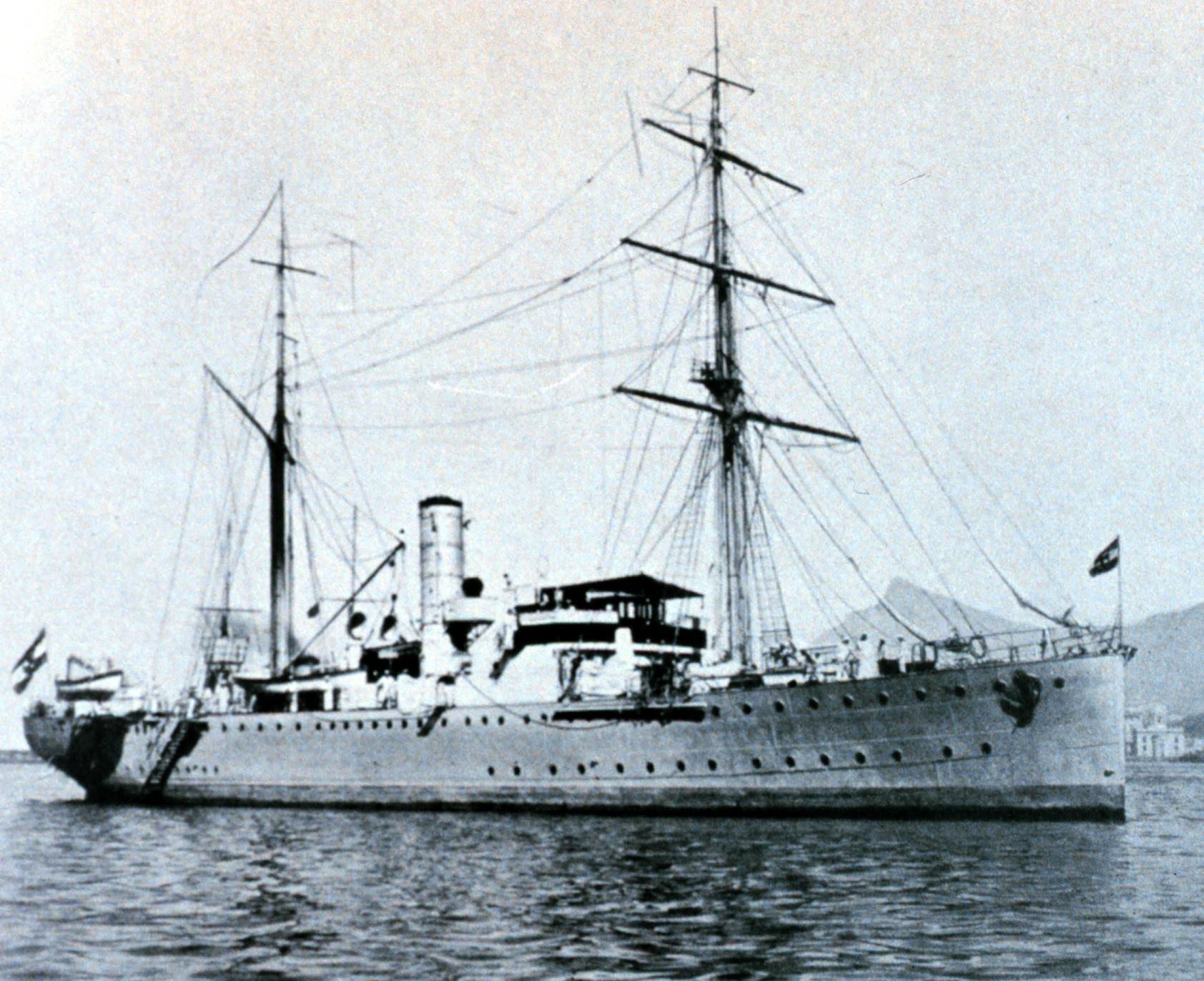
- Meteor

History
- Name: Meteor
- Owner: Reichsmarine
- Route: Atlantic Ocean
- Builder: Kaiserliche Werft, Danzig, Germany
- Laid down: 26 February 1914
- Launched: 18 January 1915
- In service: 15 November 1924
- Home port: Wilhelmshaven, Germany
- Fate: Ceded to the Soviet Union 1945, scrapped 1968 or later

General characteristics
- Class & type: Survey vessel
- Displacement: 1,504 tonnes
- Length: 71.10 m (233 ft 3 in)
- Beam: 10.20 m (33 ft 6 in)
- Draught: 4.00 m (13 ft 1 in)
- Speed: 11.5 knots (21.3 km/h)
- Crew: 138
- Armament: 1 × 8.8 cm (3.5 in) SK L/45 gun

Meteor was a German survey vessel, noted for her survey work in the Atlantic Ocean between 1925 and 1927. Handed over to the Soviet Union following World War II, the ship was renamed Ekvator. Her ultimate fate is not known.

== Design and construction ==
Her keel was laid at the Kaiserliche Werft at Danzig in February 1914 and Meteor was launched in January 1915. Originally intended to become a gunboat for the Imperial German Navy's colonial service she was not finished during the First World War due to limited need for lightly armed vessels.

After the war the uncompleted hull was tugged to Wilhelmshaven for outfitting work at the Reichsmarinewerft. She was outfitted as a survey vessel and early sonar equipment was fitted. The ship had a steel hull with two propellers each driven by a triple-expansion steam engine. Additionally she had a brigantine rig to boost range.

== Career ==
Meteor was commissioned as a military ship with the Reichsmarine but spent most of her life in a scientific role.

=== Scientific work ===
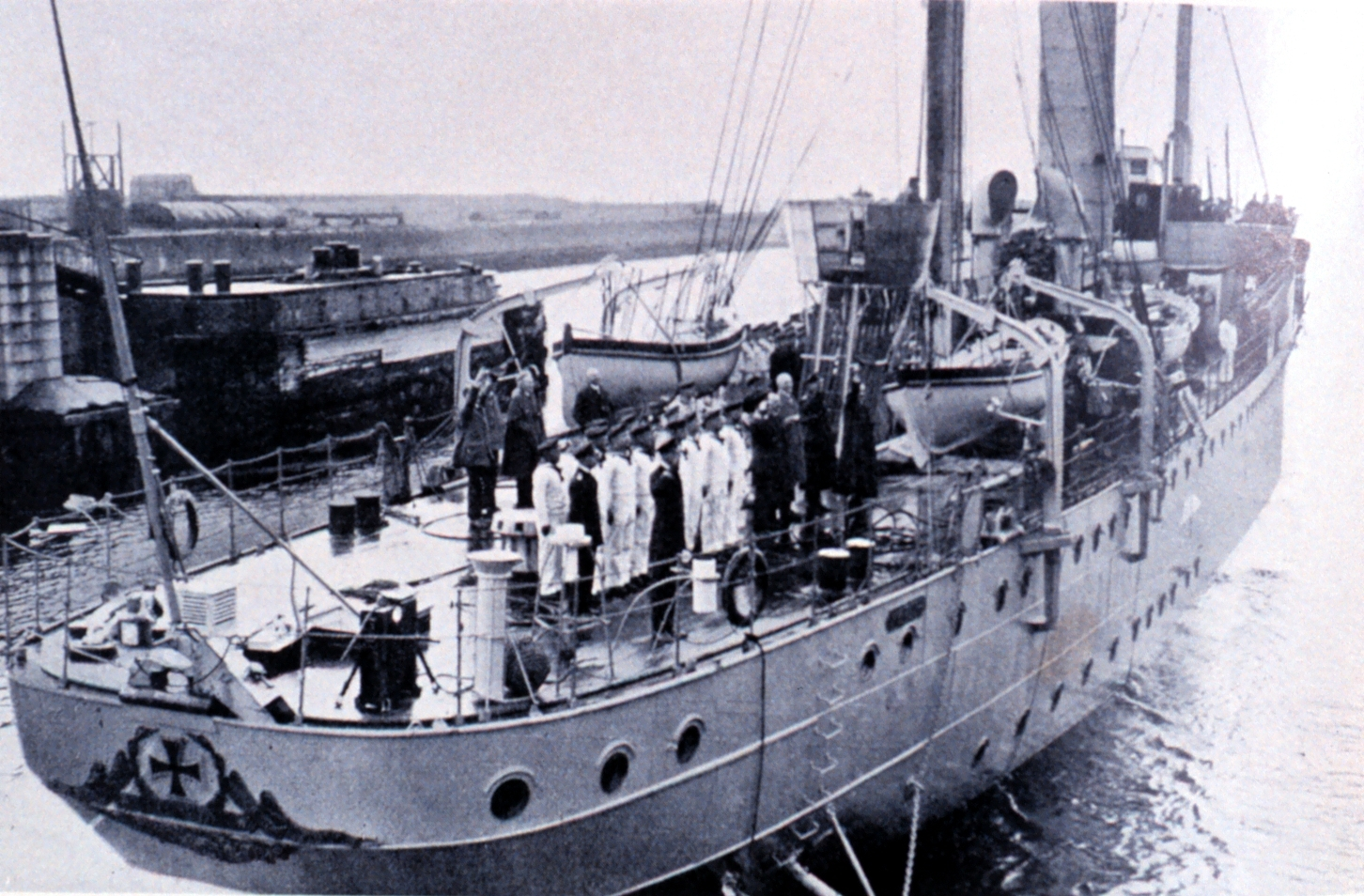
Meteor departing her homeport with full military honors

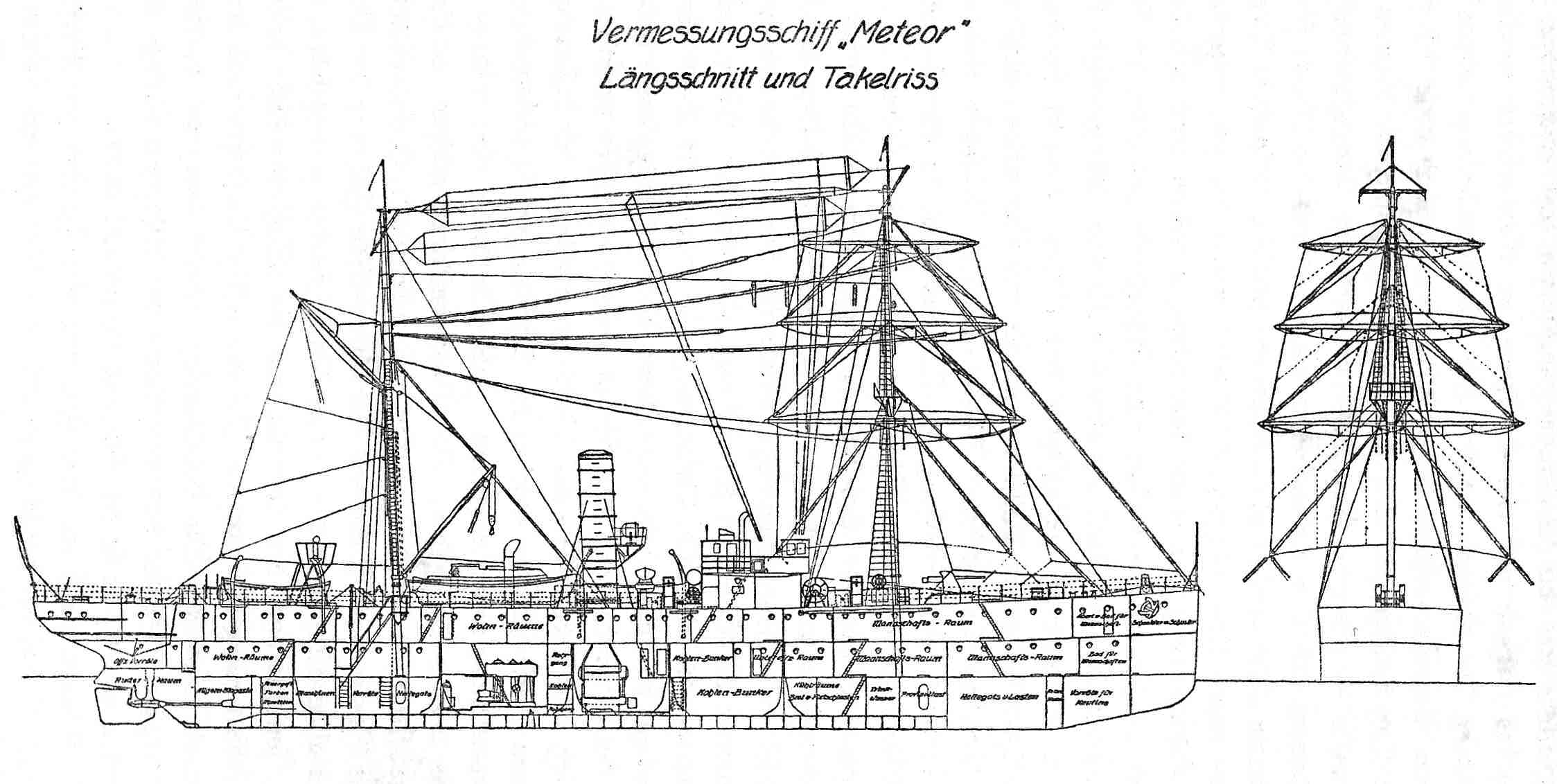
An outline of Meteor, circa 1925

Meteor entered service in November 1924 and made her maiden survey expedition between 20 January and 17 February 1925 with the main purpose to check the equipment. On 16 April 1925 Meteor started the German Atlantic expedition, also known as German Meteor expedition, and did not return to Germany until 2 June 1927. During this expedition the ship sailed more than 67,500 nautical miles (125,000 km; 77,700 mi) and took cross sections of the South Atlantic between Africa and South America mapping the entire ocean. In the course of this survey work Meteor found a bank (seamount) that rises to 560 metres (1,840 ft) below sea level from a depth of 4,000 metres (13,000 ft). This bank was named "Meteor Bank" (48°16′S 08°16′E).

Between 1929 and 1935 Meteor made several journeys to Iceland and Greenland, where she performed survey work as well as fishery protection duties.

A North Atlantic Expedition was performed in 1937/38 in order to take cross sections of the North Atlantic that complemented the earlier survey work done in the South Atlantic. During the Gulf Stream Expedition from 1938 a plateau rising to 269 metres (883 ft) below surface from a sea depth of more than 4,000 m was discovered. In order to distinguish it from the smaller bank found in the South Atlantic, this bank was named "Great Meteor Bank" and is today known as Great Meteor Seamount (29°58′N 28°38′W).

=== Second World War ===
With the outbreak of the Second World War the ship was removed from service on 8 September 1939. Reactivated in 1940 Meteor was used as a tender in the Baltic Sea as well along the Norwegian Coast. With the end of the war, the ship was laid up in Kiel.

=== Soviet service ===
In November 1945 the ship was handed over to the Soviet Union, but briefly returned into German service for a few months in 1946 to perform survey work under Soviet supervision. Eventually she became the Soviet survey vessel Ekvator. Her final fate is unclear, she was either scrapped in 1968 or survived some more years as a barracks ship.

== Heritage ==
Thee German research vessels were named after the Meteor:

- RV Meteor (1964); sold to New Zealand in 1986 and renamed Rapuhia; scrapped 1993
- RV Meteor (1986); in service
- RV Meteor (2026), newbuilt, under construction

== See also ==
- German Meteor expedition 1925-27
- Meteor Deep, deepest spot of the South Sandwich Trench (8,428 m)
- Great Meteor Seamount
