= Bess Ward =

American oceanographer

- Education: University of Washington (PhD, MS); Michigan State University (BS)
- Known for: Biological oceanography, Biogeochemistry, Nitrogen cycle
- Scientific career
- Fields: Oceanography, Biogeochemistry, Microbiology
- Workplaces: Princeton University
- Thesis: Marine Ammonium-Oxidizing Bacteria: Abundance And Activity In The Northeast Pacific Ocean (1982)
- Doctoral advisor: Mary Jane Perry
- Doctoral students: Mary Voytek, Sarah Fawcett

Bess Ward is an American oceanographer, biogeochemist, microbiologist, and William J. Sinclair Professor of Geosciences at Princeton University.

Ward's studies include marine and global nitrogen cycles, and how marine organisms such as phytoplankton and bacteria influence the nitrogen cycle. Ward was the first woman awarded the G. Evelyn Hutchinson Award from the Association for the Sciences of Limnology and Oceanography (ASLO) for her pioneering work on applying molecular methods for nitrogen and methane conversions as well as scaling up organismal biogeochemical rates to whole ecosystem rates.

== Education and early career ==
Ward received her Bachelor of Sciences degree in zoology from the Michigan State University in 1976. Ward went on to obtain a Master's degree in biological oceanography from the University of Washington in 1979, followed by her PhD at the same institution in 1982. Ward's early work focused on quantifying the rates of nitrogen transformation performed by bacteria and phytoplankton, and was the editor for a special edition of Marine Chemistry on "Aquatic Nitrogen Cycles" in 1985.

After her PhD, Ward worked as a research biologist and oceanographer at the Scripps Institution of Oceanography in San Diego, California, where she also served as the chairperson of the Food Chain Research Group.

== Career ==
Ward became a professor of Marine Sciences at the University of California, Santa Cruz in 1989. From 1995–1998, Ward was the Chair of the Ocean Sciences Department at University of California, Santa Cruz before becoming a professor in the Department of Geosciences at Princeton University in 1998. In 2006, Ward became the Chair of the Department of Geosciences at Princeton and has held the position ever since. Ward has held numerous visiting scientist and trustee positions throughout her career at institutions such as the Bermuda Institute of Ocean Sciences, Plymouth Marine Laboratory, and the Max Planck Institute für Limnologie. As of 2018, Ward had advised 21 graduate students and 20 postdoctoral scholars. Broadly, Ward and her lab members research how bacteria and phytoplankton transform and use nitrogen in marine and coastal ecosystems using various molecular and isotopic techniques. Ward spends time on research cruises and expeditions, conducting research (and sometimes teaching remotely) while on the ocean for days to weeks at a time.

=== Nitrogen cycling ===
Areas in the ocean that are low in oxygen, called oxygen deficient zones (ODZs), are important areas for nitrogen cycling yet only make up about 0.1-0.2% of the total volume of the world ocean. Over one quarter of all nitrogen in the oceans is lost to gaseous nitrogen forms (e.g. N_{2}, N_{2}O) in the ODZs through various nitrogen transformation pathways including denitrification and anammox, however, the rates of nitrogen transformation and type of transformation that is taking place in ODZs remains unclear and subject of much of Ward's research. Ward and her lab developed an isotopic tracer method to measure the rate of N_{2}O reduction in the Eastern Tropical North Pacific Ocean and found that incomplete denitrification in ODZs increases N_{2}O accumulation and eventual efflux to the atmosphere. N_{2}O is a potent greenhouse gas and Ward's research shows that the expanding ODZs in the global ocean may increase the amount of N_{2}O entering the atmosphere.

=== Professional service ===
Ward has served on review panels of university graduate programs, institutional oceanography programs, and National Science Foundation funding programs.

== Awards ==
- Marie Tharp Award Lecture, Helmholz Center for Ocean Research, Kiel, Germany, (2016)
- Charnock Lecturer, Southampton Oceanography Center, UK, (2015)
- Woods Hole Oceanographic Institution Chemical Oceanography H. Burr Steinbach Scholar of (2015)
- Rachel Carson Award Lecture, American Geophysical Union (2014)
- Samuel A. Waxman Honorary Lectureship, Theobald Smith Society, (2014)
- Procter & Gamble Award, American Society for Microbiology, (2012)
- Fellow of the American Academy of Arts and Sciences, (2004)
- Fellow of the American Geophysical Union, (2002)
- Fellow of the American Academy of Microbiology, (1999)
- Who's Who in American University Teachers, (1997)
- G. Evelyn Hutchinson Medal, American Society of Limnology and Oceanography, (1997)
- Distinguished Visiting Biologist, Woods Hole Oceanographic Institution, March (1996)

== Selected publications ==
- Community composition of nitrous oxide related genes and their relationship to nitrogen cycling rates in salt marsh sediments, Frontiers in Microbiology, 9: 170 (2018)
- Denitrification as the dominant nitrogen loss process in the Arabian Sea., Nature, 461: 78-82 (2009)
- Methane oxidation and methane fluxes in the ocean surface layer and in deep anoxic waters. Nature, 327: 226-229 (1987)
