= Nils Jerlov =

Swedish oceanographer (1909–1990)

Nils Gunnar Jerlov
- Born: October 12, 1909; Malmöhus County, Sweden
- Died: May 29, 1990 (aged 82); Haga, Gothenburg, Sweden
- Occupation: Oceanographer
- Spouse: Elwi Galeen
- Parent(s): David Johnson and Hilma Henriksson

Nils Gunnar Jerlov (1909–1990) was a Swedish oceanographer, physicist, scientist, and researcher who studied how light interacts with water. He was a scientist in the field of ocean optics, and his water types are used to define the color and characteristics of natural water bodies.

== Biography ==
Nils Jerlov was born October 12, 1909, in Bosjokloster parish in what was then Malmöhus County, Sweden. Nils Jerlov was the son of David Johnson and Hilma Henriksson. He was the nephew of Sigbert and Emil Jerlov.

Jerlov attended the University of Lund, Sweden. He received a Master of Philosophy in 1932 and graduated with a Ph.D. in 1939. During that time, he became an assistant at the Swedish Hydrographic-Biological Commission in 1935 and worked in a laboratory there. In 1949 he married Elwi Galeen (1913–2008), the daughter of German director Henrik Galeen and his Swedish wife Elvira Adler.

Jerlov became an associate professor of oceanography at the University of Gothenburg, Sweden in 1953. He worked at the Swedish Fisheries Board from 1948 to 1958, at the Oceanographic Institute from 1957 to 1961, and managed a laboratory in oceanography in Gothenburg in 1961. In 1963 he was appointed professor of physical oceanography in Copenhagen, Denmark.

Jerlov participated in the Swedish deep-sea Albatross expedition in 1947–1948, a joint Italian-Swedish oceanographic expedition in 1955, Auguste Piccard's diving expedition with the Bathyscaphe deep-sea submersible in the Mediterranean in 1957, and the international oceanographic expedition with RRS Discovery II in 1959. He became a member of the Royal Society of Arts and Sciences in Gothenburg in 1954, a Fellow of International Oceanographic Foundation and Member of Corporation of Bermuda Biological Station in 1958, and Chairman of the Commission on Radiant Energy in the Sea in 1960. Beyond ocean optics, Jerlov also researched nuclear physics, environmental pollution, and the ocean heat budget. He was a knight of the Order of the North Star.

Aboard the Albatross expedition in the 1940s, Jerlov began to observe the variability in the color and light-absorbing properties of ocean waters. He proposed a water mass classification scheme for different water bodies based on their optical properties. After becoming a professor at the University of Copenhagen in Denmark in 1963, he wrote a book called Optical Oceanography (1968), later renamed Marine Optics (1976), a fundamental text to the field of oceanography. He served on the International Association for Physical Oceanography, the Scientific Committee on Oceanic Research, the Nordic Committee on Physical Oceanography, and the Danish National Board for Oceanography. Jerlov retired in 1978.

Jerlov died May 29, 1990, in Haga, Gothenburg, Sweden. He is buried in the memorial grove at Kviberg Cemetery in Gothenburg.

== Published works ==
- 1939: Effect of Chemical Combination on X-Ray Emission Spectra (Doctoral Thesis)
- 1951: Optical Studies of Ocean Water. Reports of the Swedish Deep-Sea Expedition
- 1953: Particle Distribution in the Ocean
- 1956: The Equatorial Currents in the Pacific
- 1958: Maxima in the vertical Distribution of Particles in the Sea
- 1961: Optical Measurements in the eastern North Atlantic. Discovery II exp. of August and September 1959, Medd. Oceanogr. Inst. Goteborg
- 1964: Factors influencing the colour of the oceans, in: Studies on Oceanography
- 1968: Optical Oceanography
- 1964: Optical classification of ocean water, in: Physical Aspects of Light in the Sea: A Symposium (University of Hawaii Press), J. E. Tyler, Ed.
- 1976: Marine Optics

== Jerlov Water Types ==
Light transmittance of different Jerlov water types over the visible light spectrum.

Light attenuation of different Jerlov water types over the visible light spectrum.

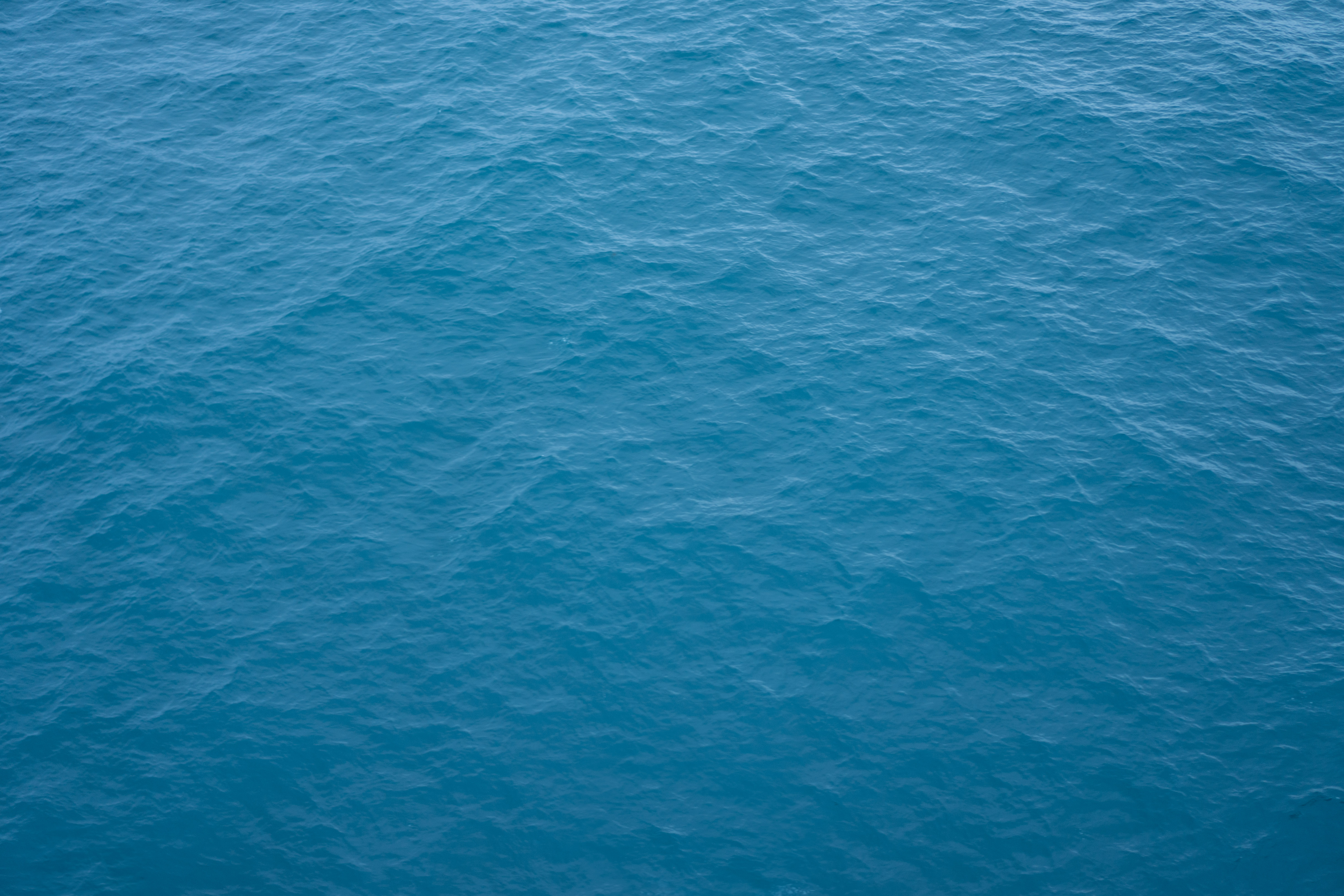
Jerlov is well known for his classification of water types by their color and optical properties.

Jerlov is perhaps best known for his classification of water bodies by their color and optical properties into several "water types" that group waters by their light absorption and scattering properties. They range from pure blue ocean waters to darker, greener coastal waters, with "Baltic Sea", and "Black Sea" representing the darkest, most turbid water types. Jerlov water types are used by researchers in many fields to understand the heat content and transparency of lakes, rivers, estuaries, and oceans. For example, Jerlov water types are a feature of hydrodynamic computer models of the ocean (for example, ROMS) to more accurately simulate how water will absorb heat and light. Dark water bodies absorb more energy than bright blue waters of the open ocean. His water types remain useful for climate modeling and ocean circulation research, among many other applications.

== Recognition ==
The Oceanography Society presents an award in Jerlov's honor every two years to a prominent researcher in the field of ocean optics. The Jerlov Award is presented at the Ocean Optics conference with support from the NASA and the U.S. Office of Naval Research, with a pin designed by Judith Munk.

== See also ==
- Albatross expedition
- Color of water
- Ocean color
- Ocean optics
- The Oceanography Society
