= Mary Jane Perry =

American oceanographer

- Scientific career
- Thesis: Dynamics of phosphate utilization by marine phytoplankton in chemostat cultures and in oliogotrophic waters of the Central North Pacific Ocean (1974)
- Doctoral advisor: Richard W. Eppley
- Doctoral students: Collin Roesler, Bess Ward

Mary Jane Perry is an American oceanographer known for the use of optics to study marine phytoplankton.

== Education and career ==
Perry has a B.A. from the College of New Rochelle (1969) and a Ph.D. from Scripps Institution of Oceanography, University of California, San Diego (1974). Following her Ph.D., she was a postdoc fellow at Washington University School of Medicine with Oliver H. Lowry and then joined the research faculty at the University of Washington. Perry was at the National Science Foundation from 1980 to 1982 before returning to the University of Washington. In 1999, she became a professor at the School of Marine Sciences at the University of Maine, and transition into emerita Professor in 2016.

In addition to her research, Perry is known for starting an optical oceanography class with Kendall Carder that was initially held at Friday Harbor Laboratories and subsequently moved to the University of Maine. In 2015, the class celebrated 30 years of educating over 200 students and postdocs on the use of optics to study the ocean.

In 2009, Perry was named a fellow of The Oceanography Society and her nomination reads as follows:

For contributions to the founding and advancement of the sub-discipline of bio-optical oceanography and the education of more than a generation of bio-optics students

== Research ==
Perry's graduate research centered on the utilization of phosphorus in the marine environment where she first adapted a method from the medical community to measure alkaline phosphatase in the North Pacific. She then used radiolabeled phosphorus to quantify phosphate uptake in diatom cultures and in seawater samples.

As Perry's research became more centered on phytoplankton, she was involved in early research projects using flow cytometery in the marine environment and worked on photoadaption in phytoplankton. Perry and her students' research further examined how phytoplankton and non-living organic material could be separated with light and the absorption of light by phytoplankton.

Perry was a part of a collaborative effort to expand the use of gliders to make optical measurements. This portion of her research led to examining the role of stratification in driving the North Atlantic spring bloom and how eddies remove organic carbon from the surface ocean. While Perry is officially retired, in 2018 she joined the group using gliders to examine production and flux of carbon in the euphotic zone as part of the EXPORTS program.

=== Selected publications ===
- Rudnick, Daniel L.; Davis, Russ E.; Eriksen, Charles C.; Fratantoni, David M.; Perry, Mary Jane (2004-06-01). "Underwater Gliders for Ocean Research". Marine Technology Society Journal. 38 (2): 73–84. doi:10.4031/002533204787522703.
- Perry, Mary Jane (2020-01-03). "A 50-Year Journey from Phosphate to Autonomous Underwater Vehicles". Annual Review of Marine Science. 12 (1): 1–22. Bibcode:2020ARMS...12....1P. doi:10.1146/annurev-marine-010419-010945. ISSN 1941-1405. PMID 31525127.
- Roesler, Collin S.; Perry, Mary Jane; Carder, Kendall L. (1989). "Modeling in situ phytoplankton absorption from total absorption spectra in productive inland marine waters". Limnology and Oceanography. 34 (8): 1510–1523. Bibcode:1989LimOc..34.1510R. doi:10.4319/lo.1989.34.8.1510. ISSN 1939-5590.
- Spinrad, Richard W.; Carder, Kendall L.; Perry, Mary Jane (1994). Ocean optics. New York: Oxford University Press. ISBN 1-4294-1089-2. OCLC 252589565.

== Awards ==
- Fellow, The Oceanography Society (2009)
- Distinguished MAINE Professor (2014)
- Rachel Carson lecture, American Geophysical Union (2015)
