= Ellen S. Kappel =

American oceanography science communicator

- Education: Columbia University, Cornell University
- Occupations: Oceanographer, editor, science communicator
- Employers: Columbia University (1985–1986); National Academies of Sciences, Engineering, and Medicine (1999–2000); National Research Council (1999–2000)
- Awards: Waldo E. Smith Award (2022)

Ellen Sue Kappel Berman is a science communicator in the area of oceanography. After earning her Ph.D. in marine geology and geophysics, Kappel worked as program manager for the Ocean Drilling Program and later established a company helping to make the case for funding of geoscience programs. She has been the head editor of Oceanography since 2004.

== Early life and education ==
Ellen Kappel grew up in New York City.

She received a bachelor's degree in geology from Cornell University in 1980. Her undergraduate thesis was on seismicity in the Sunda Arc. She went on to earn a Ph.D. in marine geology and geophysics from the Lamont–Doherty Earth Observatory of Columbia University in 1985.

== Career ==
Several field trips during Kappel's undergraduate education established her interest in geology. During her Ph.D. program at the Lamont–Doherty Earth Observatory, she started her studies on the seismology group but a research cruise with marine geophysicist William B. Ryan changed her focus. Kappel's Ph.D. thesis, Evidence for volcanic episodicity and a non-steady state rift valley, focused on volcanic episodicity of the ocean's crust along the Juan de Fuca Ridge. Ryan describes the impact of her work: "More than 20 years after the publication of her thesis, Kappel's interpretation that volcanic construction of the ocean's crust along mid-ocean ridge spreading centers occurs in episodic pulses is still widely cited." Her doctoral and postdoctoral work at Lamont–Doherty included multiple research cruises in the Atlantic and Pacific Oceans and the use of side-scan sonar, deep-sea photography, and submersible observations.

After nine months of postdoctoral work, Kappel moved to Washington, D.C. and became the assistant program manager at the Ocean Drilling Program at the Joint Oceanographic Institutions. At that position she also served as the director of the U.S. Science Support Program, allocating funds to those in the Ocean Drilling Program. Kappel worked at Joint Oceanographic Institutions for twelve years.

During a sabbatical break Kappel found work communicating scientific material to agency managers and others in the scientific community. In 1999 she established her own company, Geo Prose (Geosciences Professional Services), working with community members in academia and government to help promote funding for geoscience programs.

In 2004 the council of The Oceanography Society asked Kappel to serve as the editor of Oceanography, a quarterly peer-reviewed scientific journal.

She is a member of the Advisory Council for Cornell University's Department of Earth and Atmospheric Sciences. Kappel is also a member of the EV Nautilus team.
