= Oceanography (journal) =

- Discipline: Oceanography
- Language: English
- Edited by: Ellen S. Kappel

Publication details
- History: 1988–present
- Publisher: Oceanography Society (United States)
- Frequency: Quarterly
- Impact factor: 3.431 (2019)

Standard abbreviations
- ISO 4: Oceanography

Indexing
- ISSN: 1042-8275
- LCCN: 89645257
- OCLC no.: 848186317

Links
- Journal homepage; Online archive

Oceanography is a quarterly peer-reviewed scientific journal that publishes articles about ocean science and its applications. It is published by The Oceanography Society, a nonprofit professional society based in the United States.

In addition to its scientific articles, the journal also has a special section for news and information, society meeting reports, book reviews, and shorter editor-reviewed articles on public policy and education. One section, titled "Breaking Waves", is for short papers describing novel multidisciplinary approaches to oceanographic problems. The journal and all its back issues, dating to 1988, are available both in print and in full PDF format online in the journal website's archives. Oceanography is abstracted and indexed in the Science Citation Index Expanded. According to the Journal Citation Reports, the journal had an impact factor of 3.431 in 2019. In 2022, the journal had an h-index of 95.

Oceanography is a separate publication from Journal of Oceanography, the journal of the Oceanographic Society of Japan.
