= Ocean optics =

Study of light interaction with water and submerged materials

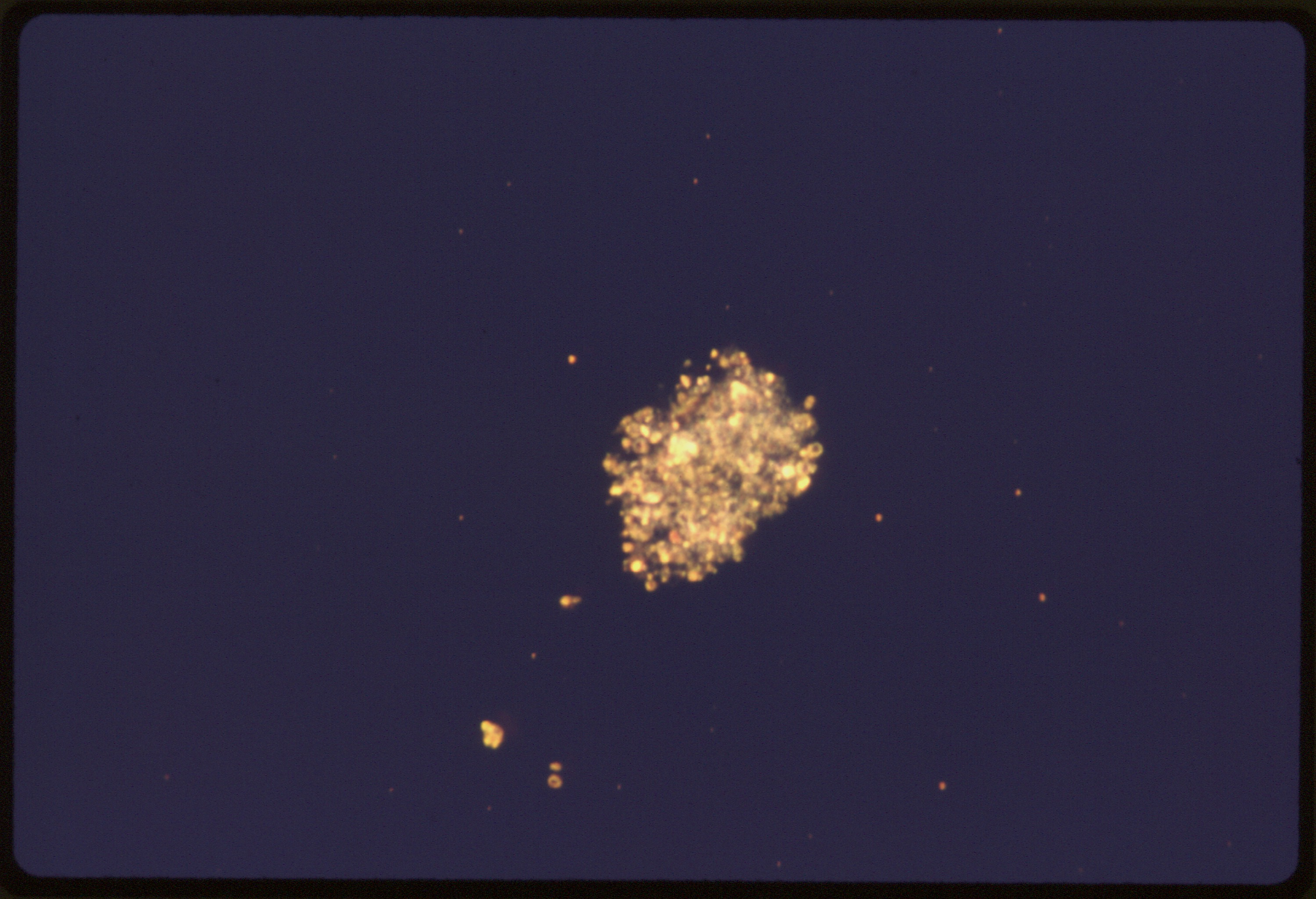
The properties of particles, such as this single particle of detritus, determine how they absorb and scatter light.

Ocean optics is the study of how light interacts with water and the materials in water. Although research often focuses on the sea, the field broadly includes rivers, lakes, inland waters, coastal waters, and large ocean basins. How light acts in water is critical to how ecosystems function underwater. Knowledge of ocean optics is needed in aquatic remote sensing research in order to understand what information can be extracted from the color of the water as it appears from satellite sensors in space. The color of the water as seen by satellites is known as ocean color. While ocean color is a key theme of ocean optics, optics is a broader term that also includes the development of underwater sensors using optical methods to study much more than just color, including ocean chemistry, particle size, imaging of microscopic plants and animals, and more.

== Key terminology ==
=== Optically deep ===
Where waters are “optically deep,” the bottom does not reflect incoming sunlight, and the seafloor cannot be seen by humans or satellites. The vast majority of the world's oceans by area are optically deep. Optically deep water can still be relatively shallow water in terms of total physical depth, as long as the water is very turbid, such as in estuaries.

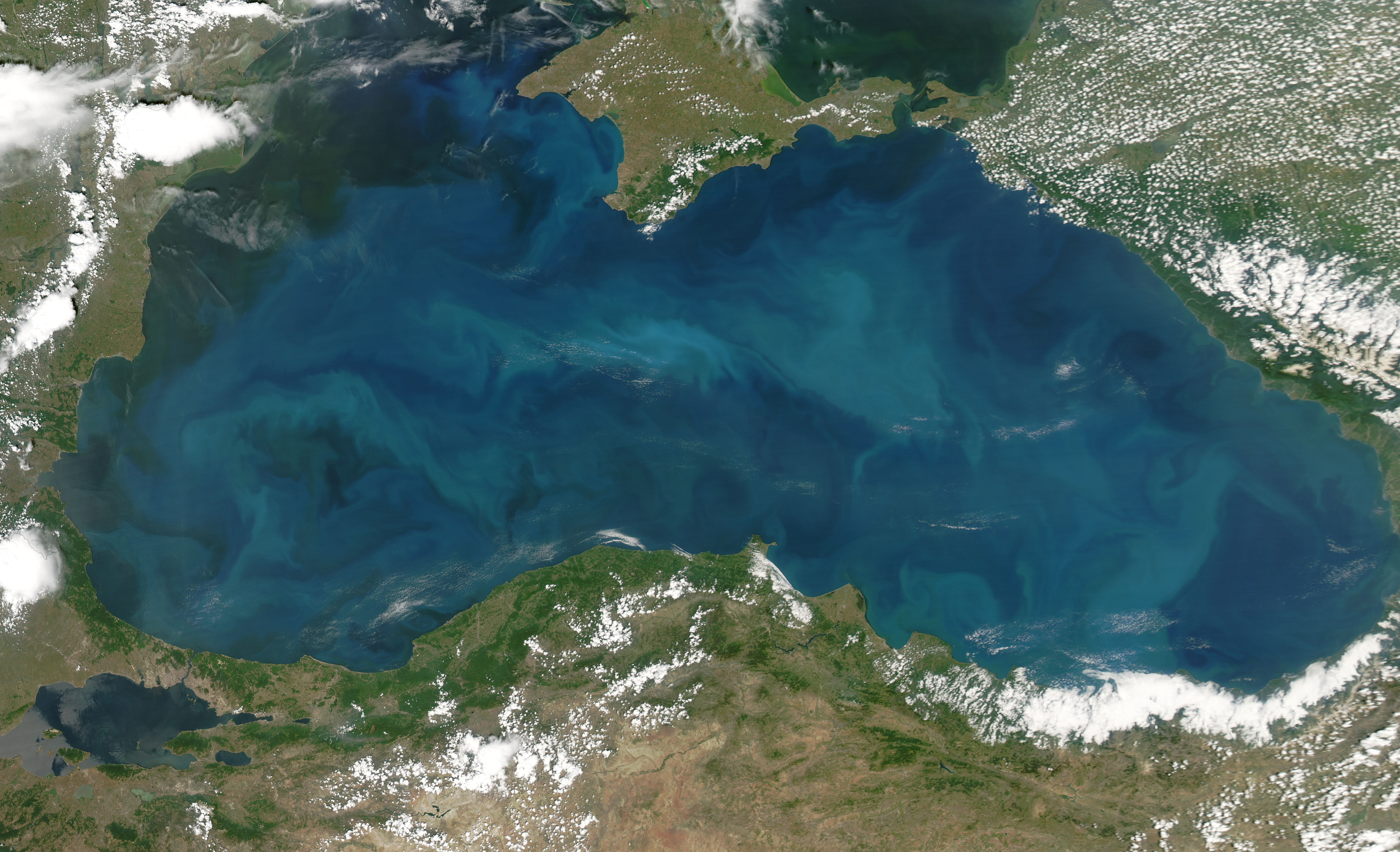
MODIS-Aqua satellite image of the Black Sea captured on June 20, 2006. All the water that we can see at the scale of this image is optically deep, because the seafloor is not visible to the satellite sensor.

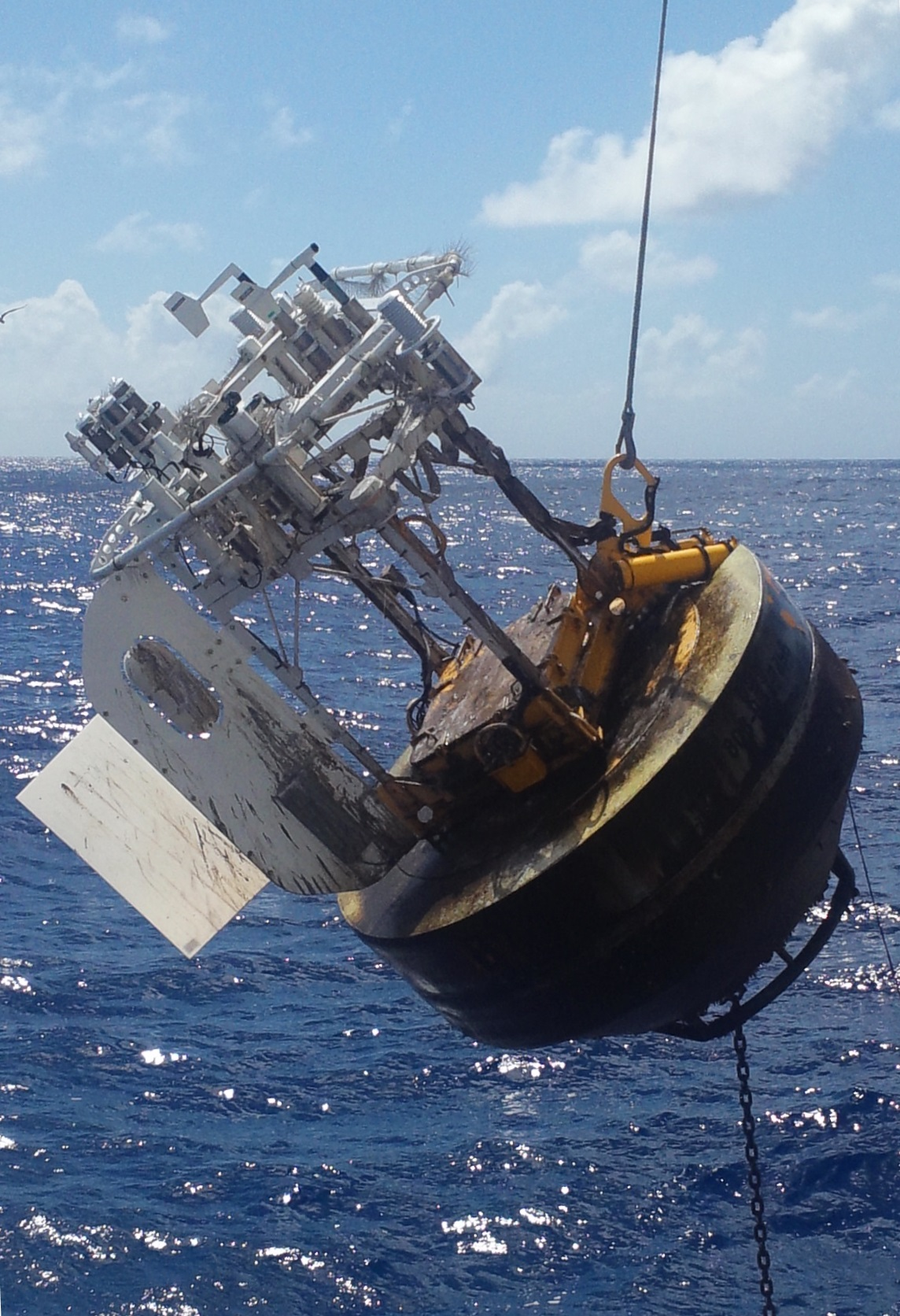
Many oceanographic buoys and weather buoys at sea are located in optically deep waters, like the one being recovered in this photo 60 nautical miles north of Oahu, Hawaii.

=== Optically shallow ===
Where waters are “optically shallow,” the bottom reflects light and often can be seen by humans and satellites. Here, ocean optics can also be used to study what is under the water. Based on what color they appear to sensors, researchers can map habitat types, including macroalgae, corals, seagrass beds, and more. Mapping shallow-water environments requires knowledge of ocean optics because the color of the water must be accounted for when looking at the color of the seabed environment below.

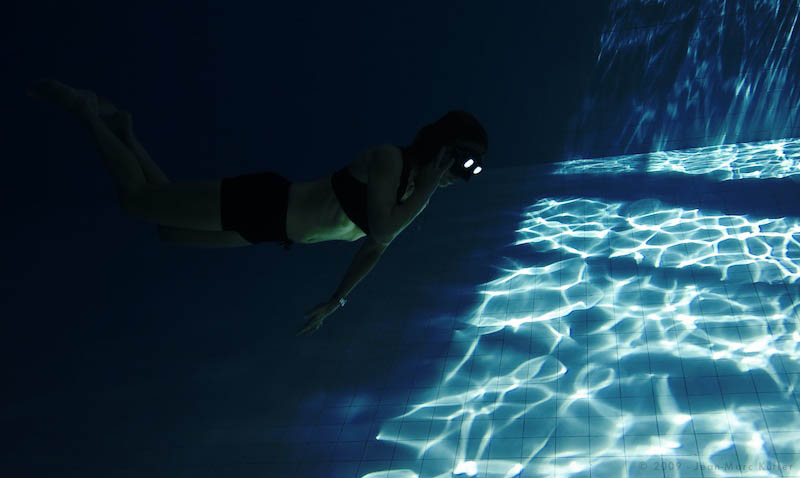
Where light reaches the bottom, the water is known as optically shallow, such as in this pool. The pattern of light on the bottom is caused by light refraction at the surface when ripples and small waves bend the water surface.

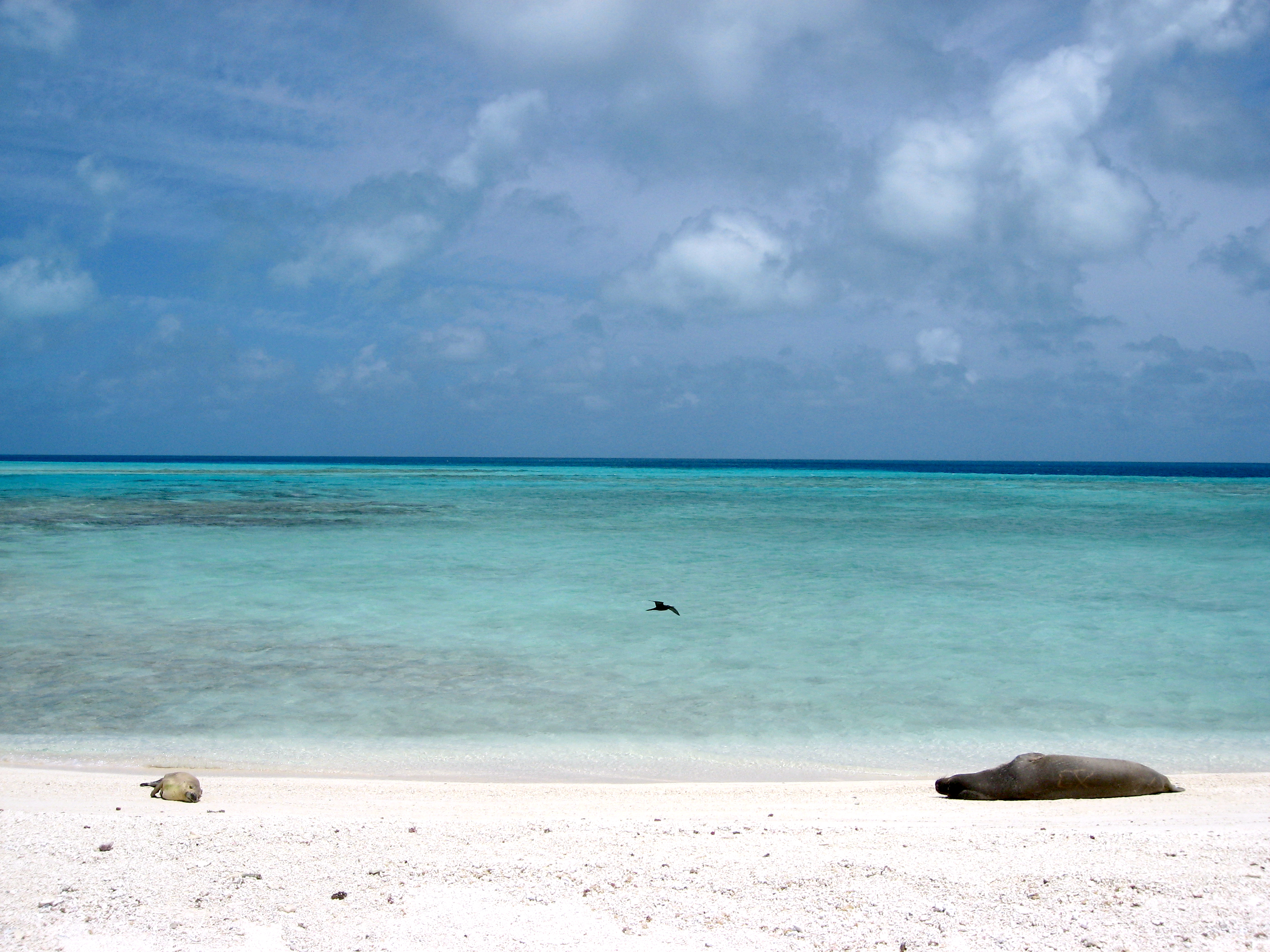
The water at many tropical beaches, such as this beach on the Kure Atoll, is optically shallow. Light reflects off white-colored sand, creating a turquoise color.

=== Inherent optical properties (IOPs) ===
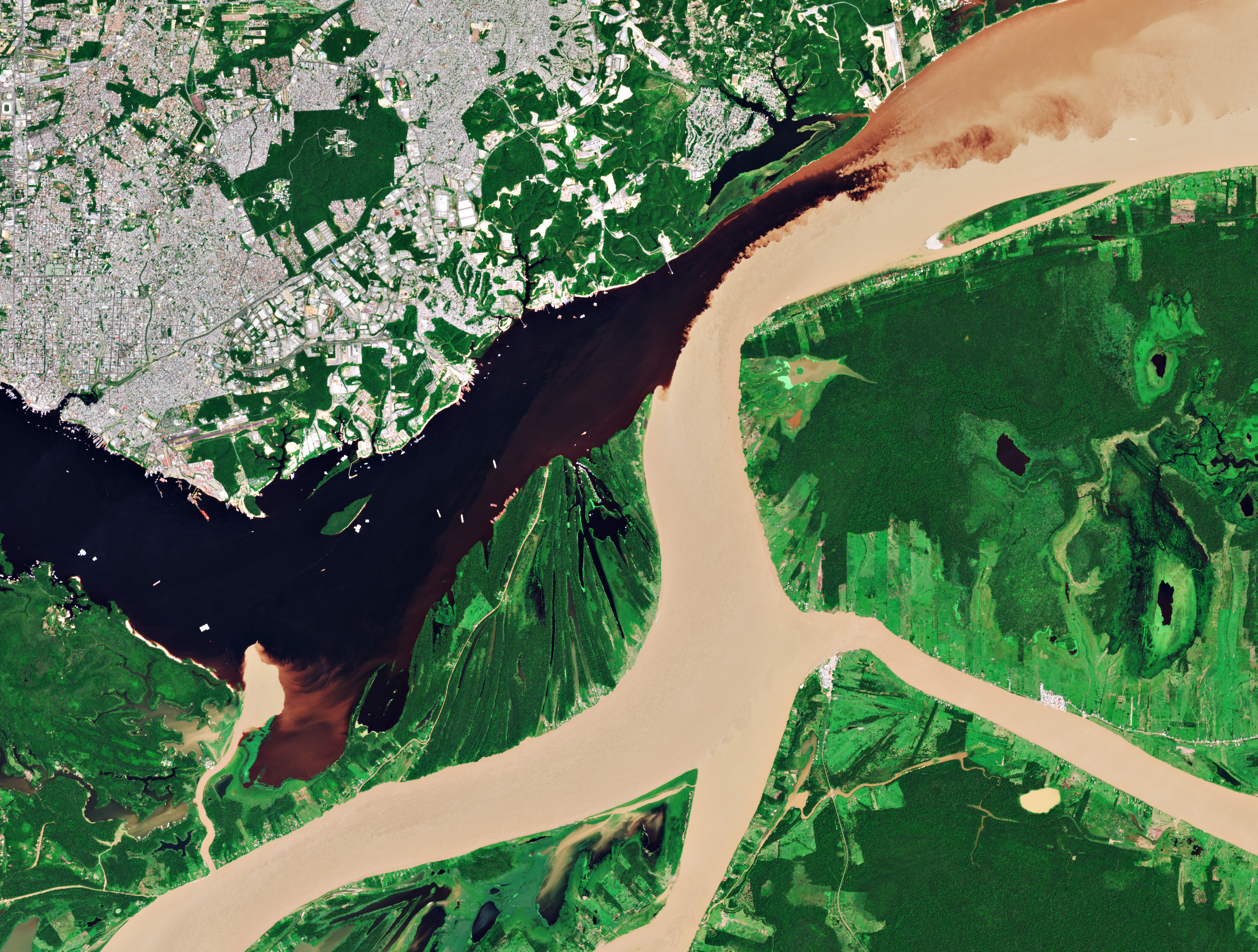
Sentinel-2 satellite image of the confluence of the Rio Negro and the Solimões River in Brazil. The dark colored water of the Rio Negro is rich in dissolved substances (high absorption), while the brighter brown colored water of the Solimões River is rich in sediments (high scattering). The properties of these two water types can be studied with methods central to the field of ocean optics.

Inherent optical properties (IOPs) depend on what is in the water. These properties stay the same no matter what the incoming light is doing (daytime or nighttime, low sun angle or high sun angle).

==== Absorption ====
Water with large amounts of dissolved substances, such as lakes with large amounts of colored dissolved organic matter (CDOM), experience high light absorption. Phytoplankton and other particles also absorb light.

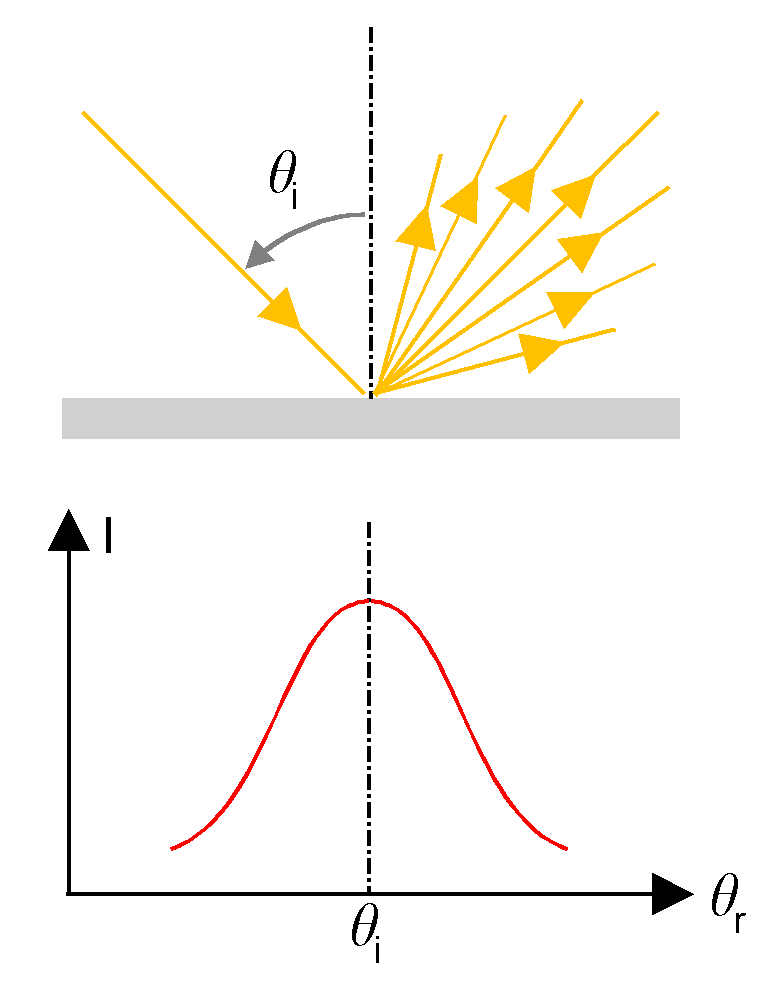
Scattering involves how light is bounced into many directions by objects such as very small particles in the ocean. Measuring light scattering involved measuring light coming from different angles.

==== Scattering ====
Areas with sea ice, estuaries with large amounts of suspended sediments, and lakes with large amounts of glacial flour are examples of water bodies with high light scattering. All particles scatter light to some extent, including plankton, minerals, and detritus. Particle size effects how much scattering happens at different colors; for example, very small particles scatter light exponentially more in the blue colors than other colors, which is why the ocean and the sky are generally blue (called Rayleigh scattering). Without scattering, light would not “go” anywhere (outside of a direct beam from the sun or other source) and we would not be able to see the world around us.

==== Attenuation ====
Attenuation in water, also called beam attenuation or the beam attenuation coefficient, is the sum of all absorption and scattering. Attenuation of a light beam in one specific direction can be measured with an instrument called a transmissometer.

=== Apparent optical properties (AOPs) ===
Apparent optical properties (AOPs) depend on what is in the water (IOPs) and what is going on with the incoming light from the Sun. AOPs depend most strongly on IOPs and only depend somewhat on incoming light aka the “light field.” Characteristics of the light field that can affect AOP measurements include the angle at which light hits the water surface (high in the sky vs. low in the sky, and from which compass direction) and the weather and sky conditions (clouds, atmospheric haze, fog, or sea state aka roughness of the surface of the water).

==== Remote sensing reflectance (Rrs) ====
Remote sensing reflectance (Rrs) is a measure of light radiating out from beneath the ocean surface at all colors, normalized by incoming sunlight at all colors. Because Rrs is a ratio, it is slightly less sensitive to what is going on with the light field (such as the angle of the sun or atmospheric haziness).

Rrs is measured using two paired spectroradiometers that simultaneously measure light coming in from the sky and light coming up from the water below at many wavelengths. Since it is a measurement of a light-to-light ratio, the energy units cancel out, and Rrs has the units of per steradian (sr-1) due to the angular nature of the measurement (upwelling light is measured at a specific angle, and incoming light is measured on a flat plane from a half-hemispherical area above the water surface).

==== Light attenuation coefficient (K_{d}) ====
K_{d} is the diffuse (or downwelling) coefficient of light attenuation (K_{d}), also called simply light attenuation, the vertical extinction coefficient, or the extinction coefficient. K_{d} describes the rate of decrease of light with depth in water, in units of per meter (m^{−1}). The “d” stands for downwelling light, which is light coming from above the sensor in a half-hemispherical shape (aka half of a basketball). Scientists sometimes use K_{d} to describe the decrease in the total visible light available for plants in terms of photosynthetically active radiation (PAR) – called “K_{d}(PAR).” In other cases, Kd can describe the decrease in light with depth over a spectrum of colors or wavelengths, usually written as “K_{d}(λ).” At one color (one wavelength) Kd can describe the decrease in light with depth of one color, such as the decrease in blue light at the wavelength 490 nm, written as “K_{d}(490).”

In general, K_{d} is calculated using Beer's Law and a series of light measurements collected from just under the water surface down through the water at many depths.

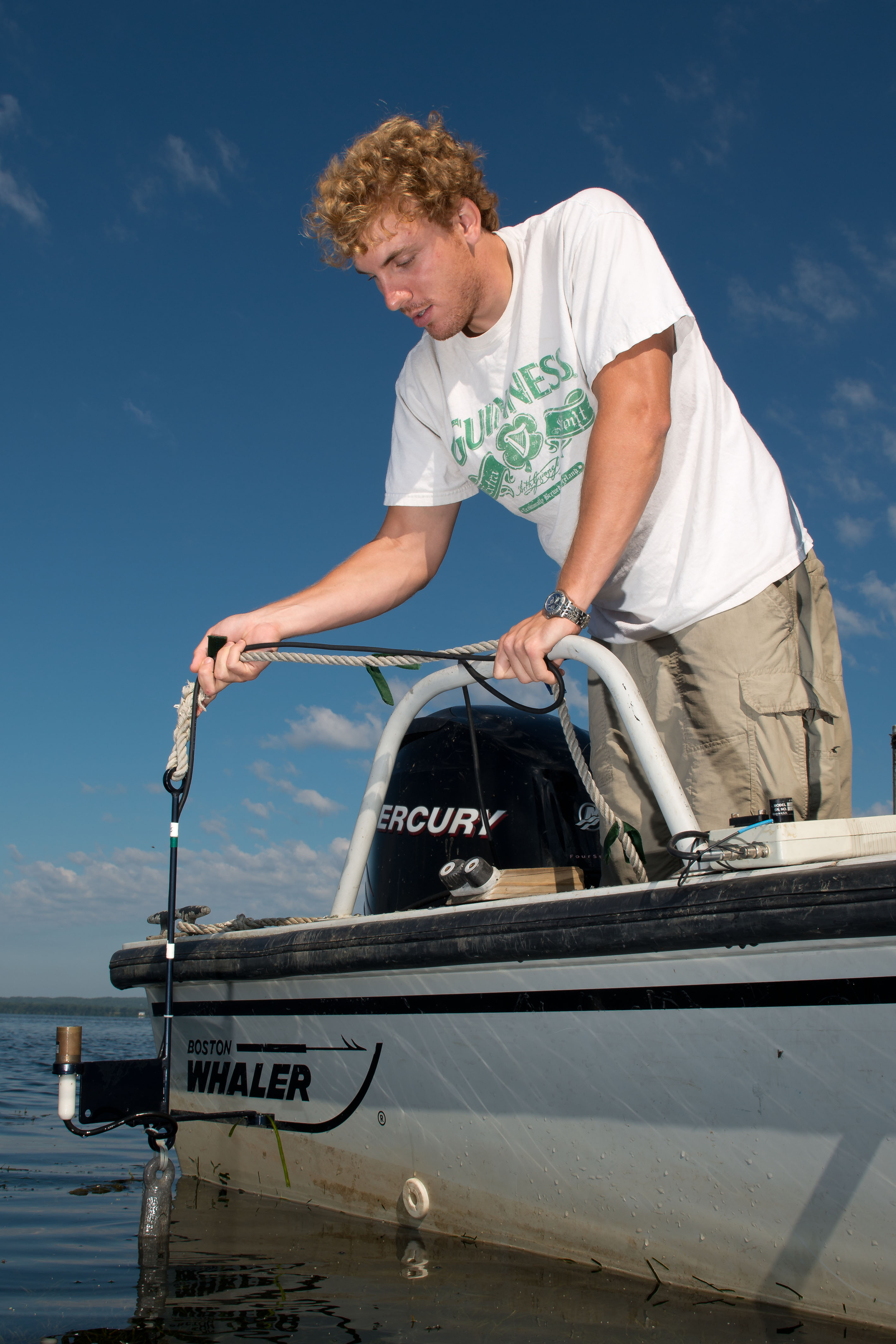
A scientist measures K_{d}(PAR) from a boat in the Chesapeake Bay. This is a measure of downwelling light attenuation using a flat-topped light sensor (small brown metal cylinder at left), called a cosine collector, to measure the light coming down onto a flat surface from above.

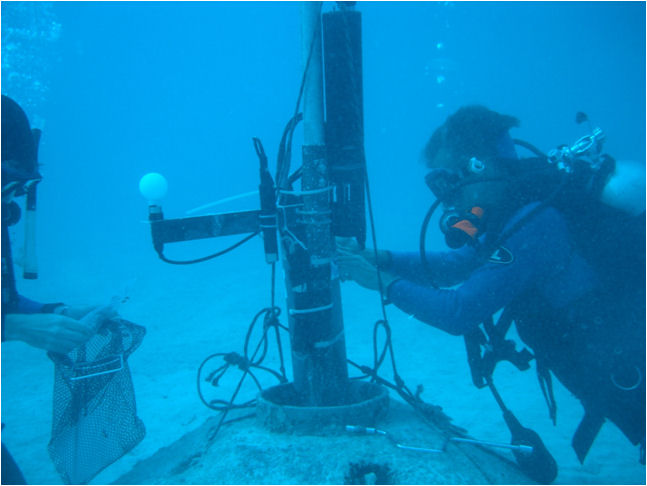
Divers set up an equipment package including a sensor to measure PAR at the seafloor. This is a measure of scalar light using a round shaped light sensor (white lightbulb-like object at left), called a spherical quanta sensor, to measure light coming from all directions spherically.

=== Closure ===
“Closure” refers to how optical oceanographers measure the consistency of models and measurements. Models refer to anything that is not explicitly measured in the water, including satellite-derived variables that are estimated using empirical relationships (for example, satellite-derived chlorophyll-a concentration is estimated from the ratios between green and blue remote sensing reflectance using an empirical relationship). Closure includes measurement closure, model closure, model-data closure, and scale closure. Where model-data closure experiments show misalignment between data and models, the cause of the misalignment may be due to measurement error, issues with the model, both, or some other external factor.

== Focus areas ==
Ocean optics has been applied to study topics like primary production, phytoplankton, zooplankton, shallow-water habitats like seagrass beds and coral reefs, marine biogeochemistry, heating of the upper ocean, and carbon export to deep waters by way of the ocean biological pump. The portion of the electromagnetic spectrum usually involved in ocean optics is ultraviolet through infrared, about 300 nm to less than 2000 nm wavelengths.

=== Common optical sensors used in oceanography ===
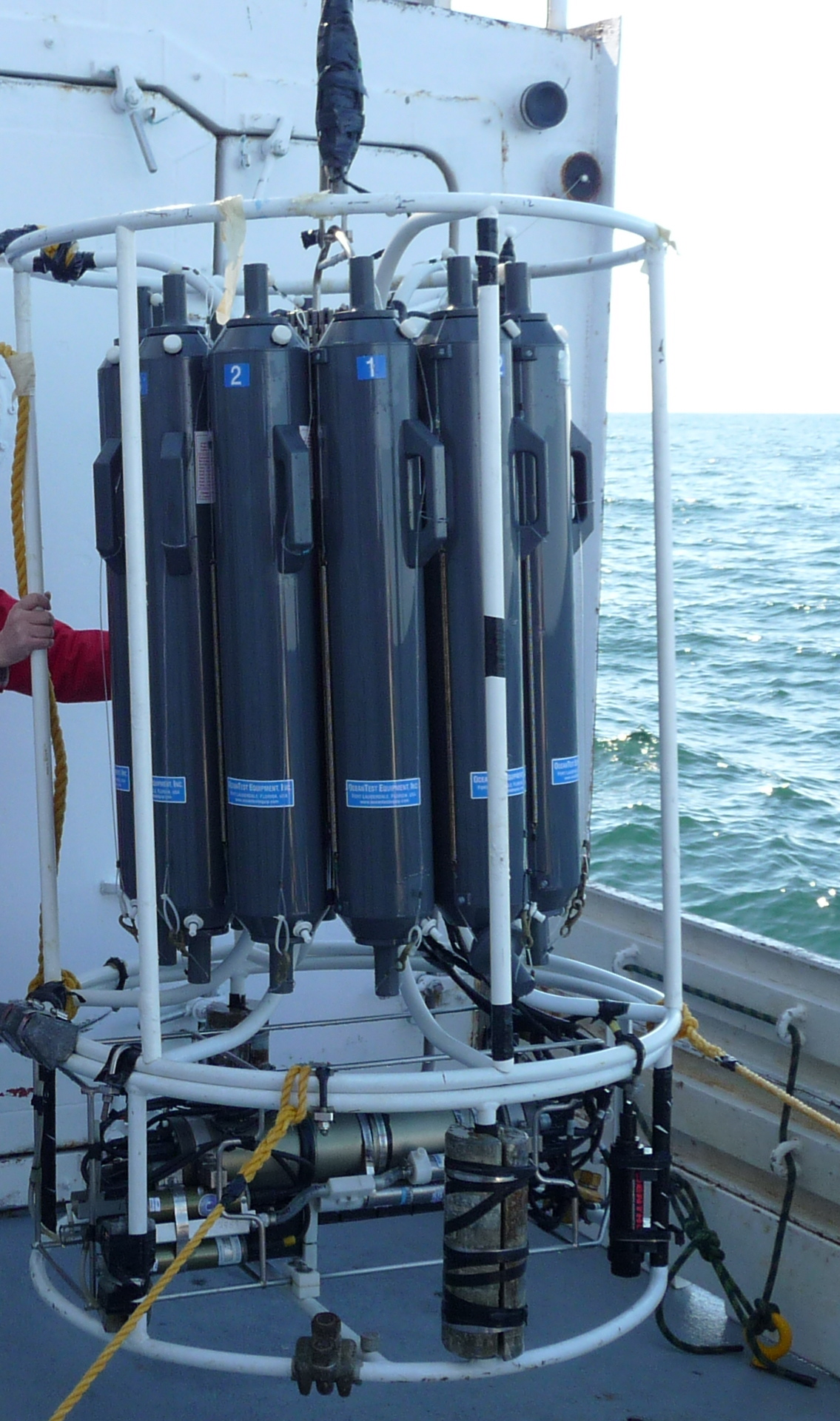
A conductivity-temperature-depth rosette (CTD-rosette) sampler instrument package ready for deployment. PAR sensors are often attached to the top circular rung of the equipment package. Optical sensors like fluorometers and transmissometers are often attached to the bottom section of the equipment package, below the Niskin bottles, on the same level as the CTD sensor (light green cylinder just visible at the bottom of this image).

The most widely used optical oceanographic sensors are PAR sensors, chlorophyll-a fluorescence sensors (fluorometers), and transmissometers. These three instruments are frequently mounted on CTD(conductivity-temperature-depth)-rosette samplers. These instruments have been used for many years on CTD-rosettes in global repeat oceanographic surveys like the CLIVAR GO-SHIP campaign.

=== Particle size in the ocean ===
Optical instruments are often used to measure the size spectrum of particles in the ocean. For example, phytoplankton organisms can range in size from a few microns (micrometers, μm) to hundreds of microns. The size of particles is often measured to estimate how quickly particles will sink, and therefore how efficiently plants can sequester carbon in the ocean's biological pump.

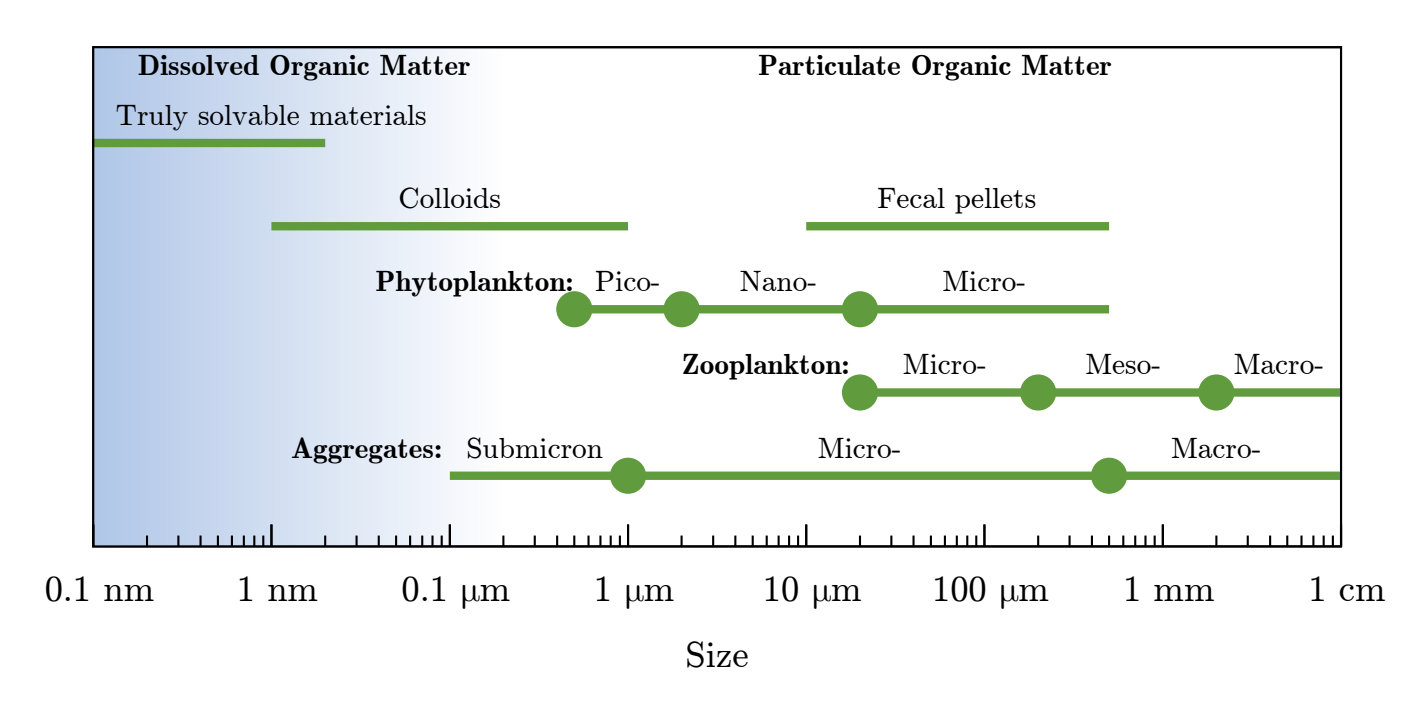
Ocean optics studies dissolved and particulate substances in the water, spanning a wide range of sizes. Many of these things are very small in size, from less than 0.1 nm to organisms at the centimeter scale. A single human hair is ~100 microns in width, for reference.

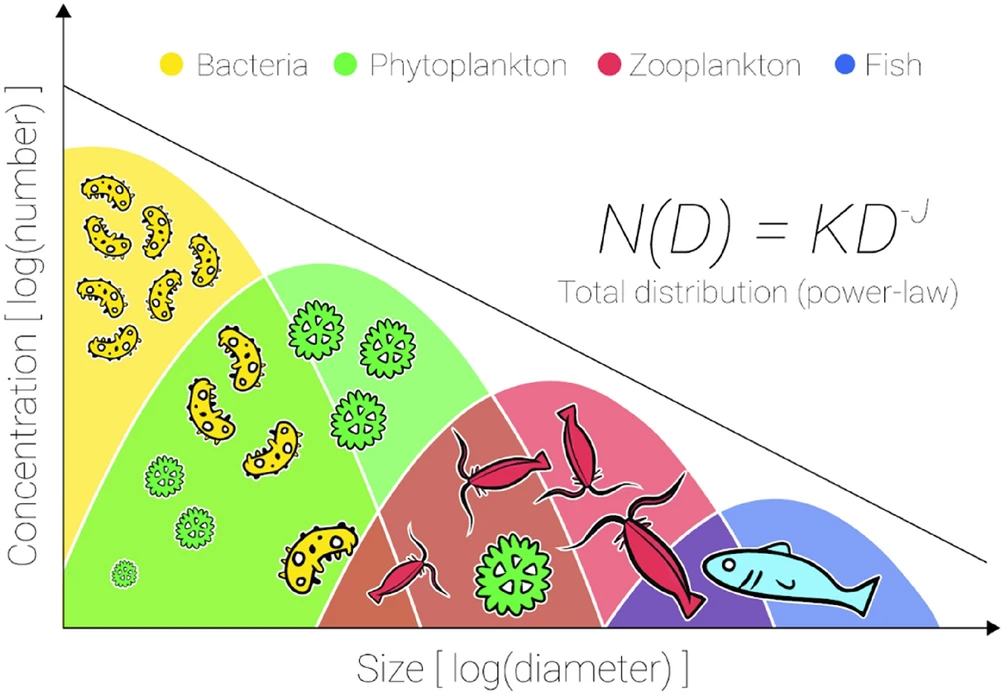
Particle size in the ocean follows a logarithmic pattern with concentration: there are exponentially more small particles than large particles. This plot shows concentration (number of particles per volume of water) on the y axis vs. particle size on the x axis.

=== Imaging of ocean particles and organisms ===
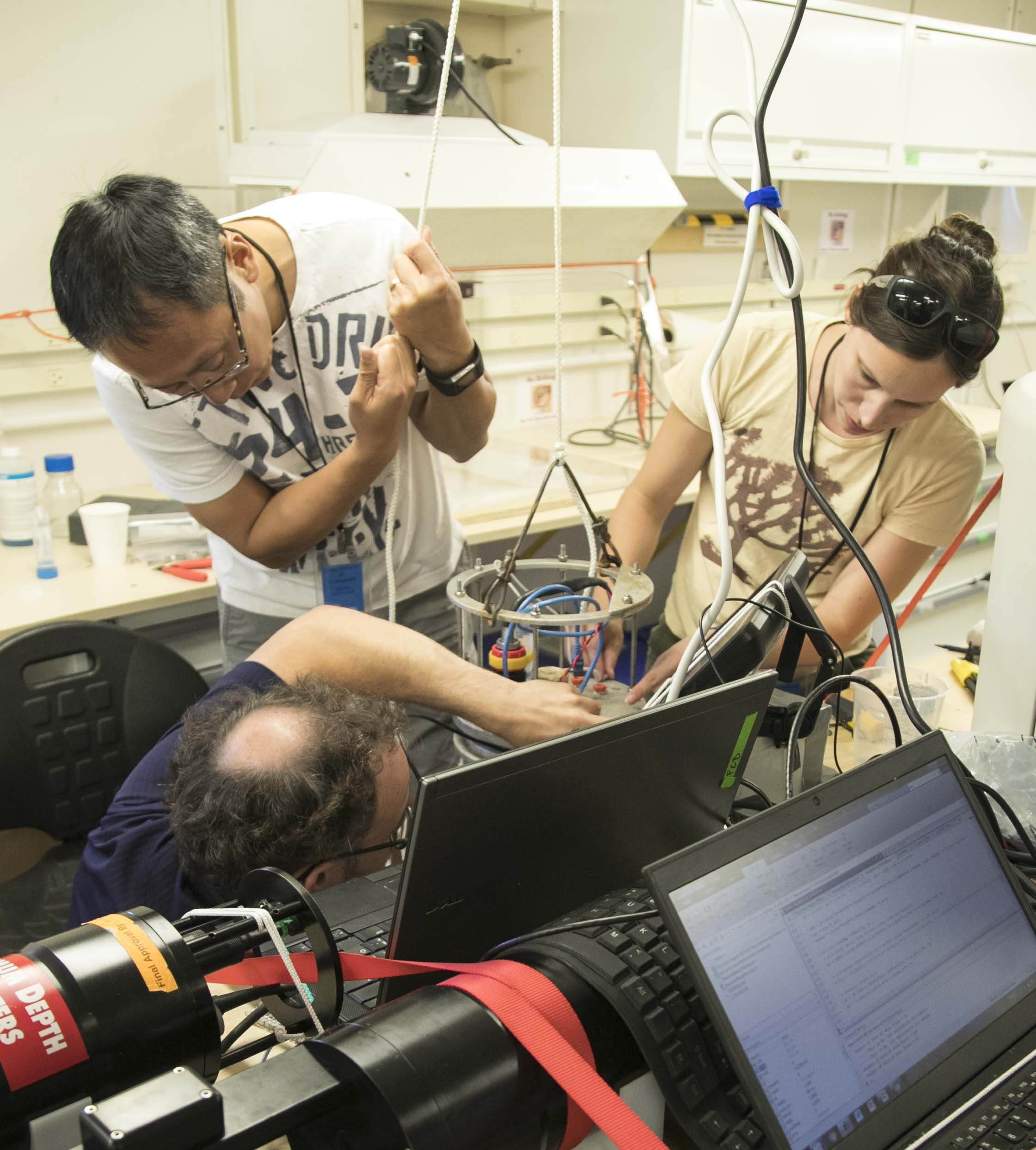
Researchers prepare an Imaging FlowCytoBot (IFCB) for water sampling.

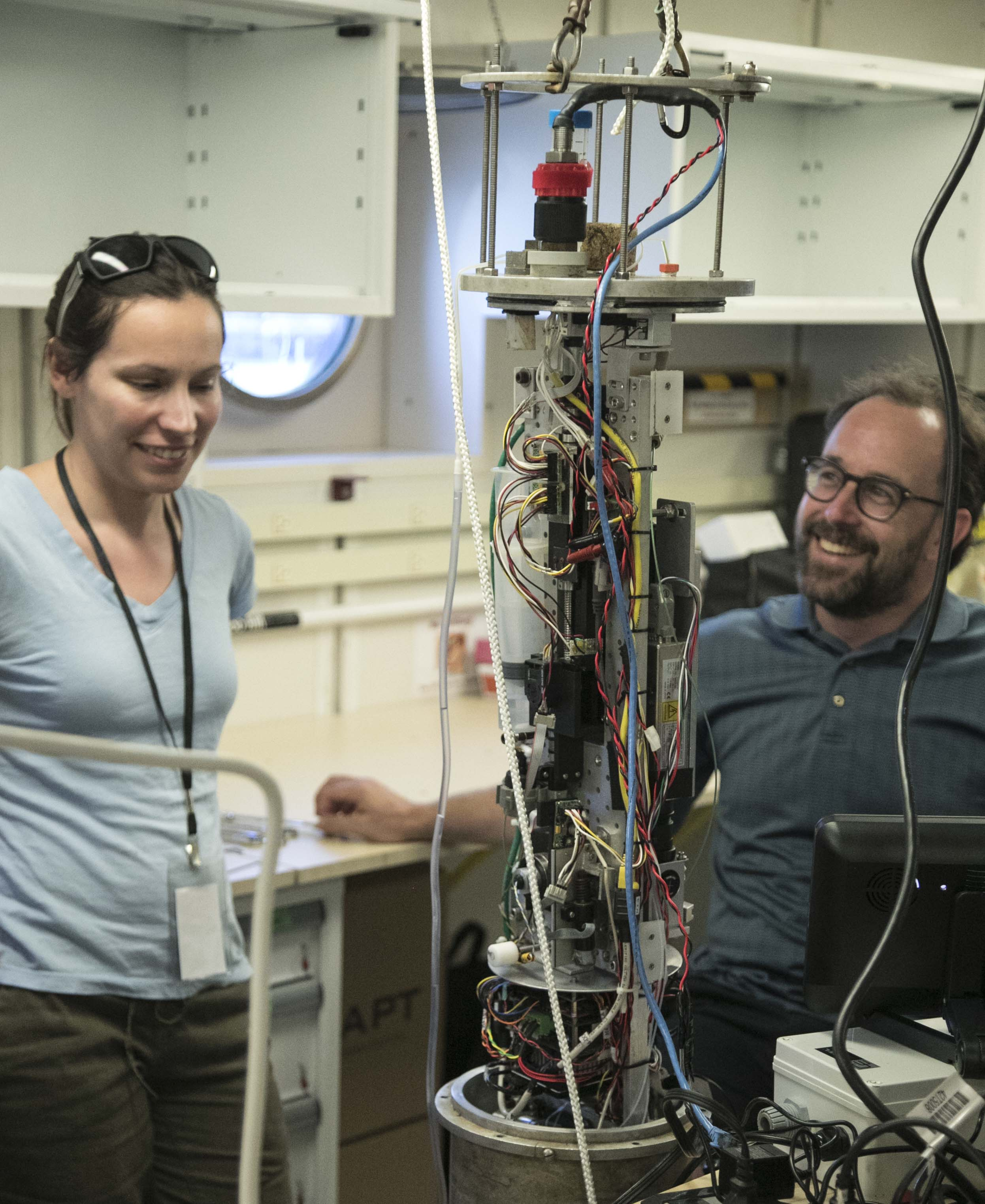
Scientists stand next to an Imaging FlowCytoBot (IFCB).

Scientists study individual tiny objects such as plankton and detritus particles using flow cytometry and in situ camera systems. Flow cytometers measure sizes and take photographs of individual particles flowing through a tube system; one such instrument is the Imaging FlowCytoBot (IFCB). In situ camera systems are deployed over the side of a research vessel, alone or attached to other equipment, and they capture photographs of the water itself to image the particles present in the water; one such instrument is the Underwater Vision Profiler (UVP). Other imaging technologies used in the ocean include holography and particle imaging velocimetry (PIV), which uses 3D video footage to track the movement of underwater particles.

=== Research in support of satellite remote sensing ===
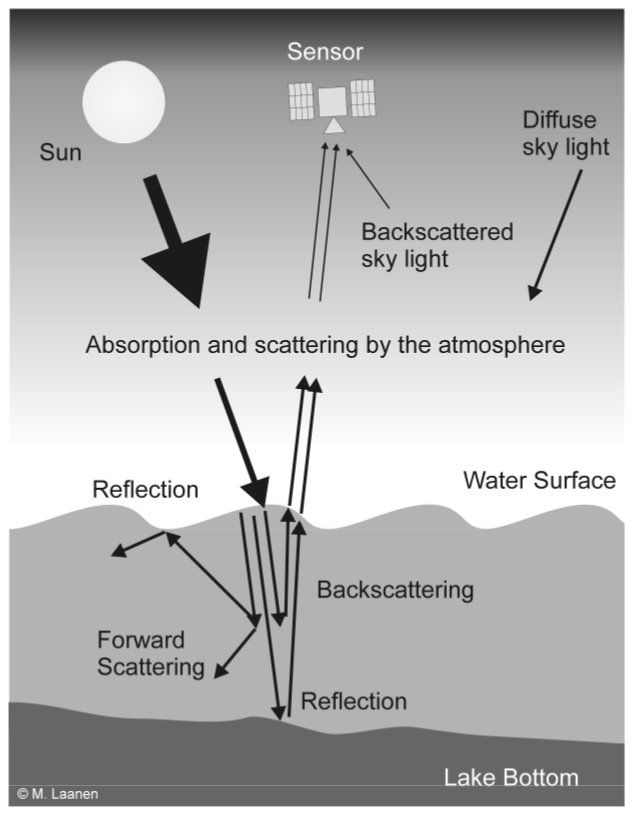
Ocean color remote sensing involves learning about the ocean based on its color as viewed by satellite sensors. The light reaching the satellite sensor starts as incoming light from the Sun, then gets scattered and absorbed by Earth's atmosphere and surface, including water on the surface. Accurate ocean color measurements depend on accurate measurements of the optical properties of the water.

Ocean optics research done “in situ” (from research vessels, small boats, or on docks and piers) supports research that uses satellite data. In situ optical measurements provide a way to: 1) calibrate satellite sensors when they are just beginning to collect data, 2) develop algorithms to derive products or variables like chlorophyll-a concentration, and 3) validate data products derived from satellites. Using satellite data, researchers estimate things like particle size, carbon, water quality, water clarity, and bottom type based on the color profile as seen by satellite; all of these estimations (aka models) must be validated by comparing them to optical measurements made in situ. In situ data are often available from publicly accessible data libraries like the SeaBASS data archive.

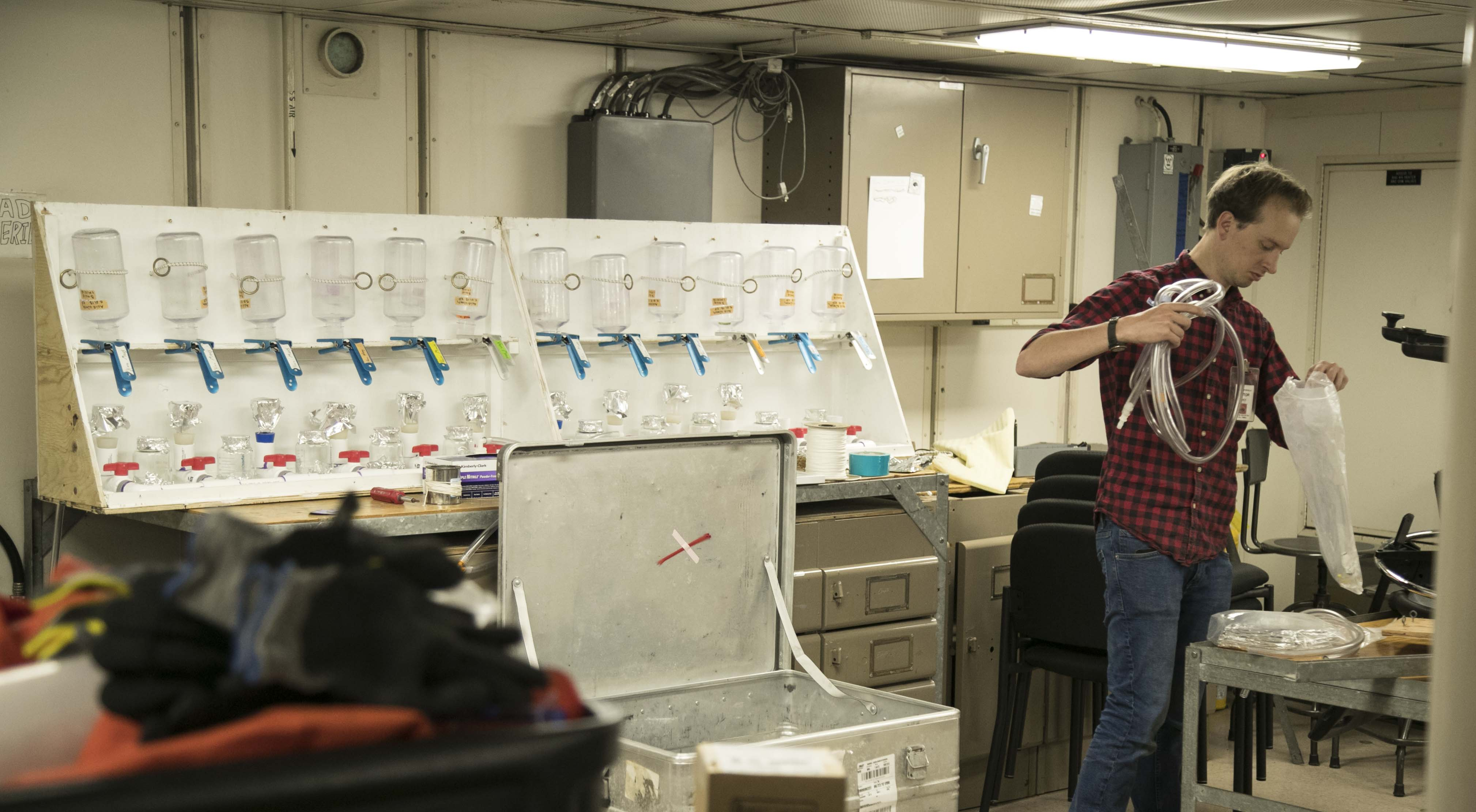
A researcher prepares a filtration rig aboard a research vessel. Some optical properties of water, like absorption by particles, are measured by filtering water and measuring the color signature of the material on the filter.

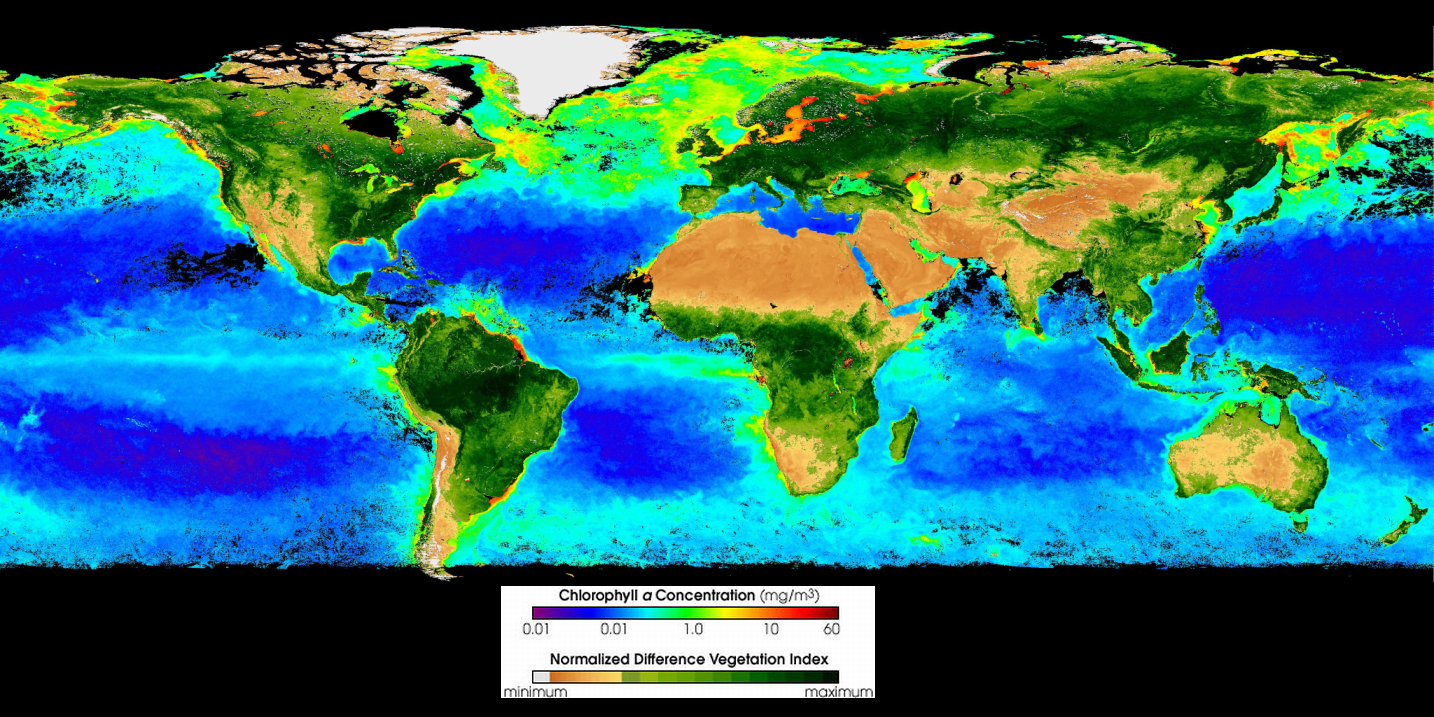
Visualization of satellite-derived global plant life, both oceanic (mg m^{−3} chlorophyll-a) and terrestrial (normalized difference land vegetation index), provided by the SeaWiFS Project, NASA Goddard Space Flight Center. The field of ocean optics includes methods that help researchers estimate ocean chlorophyll-a concentrations.

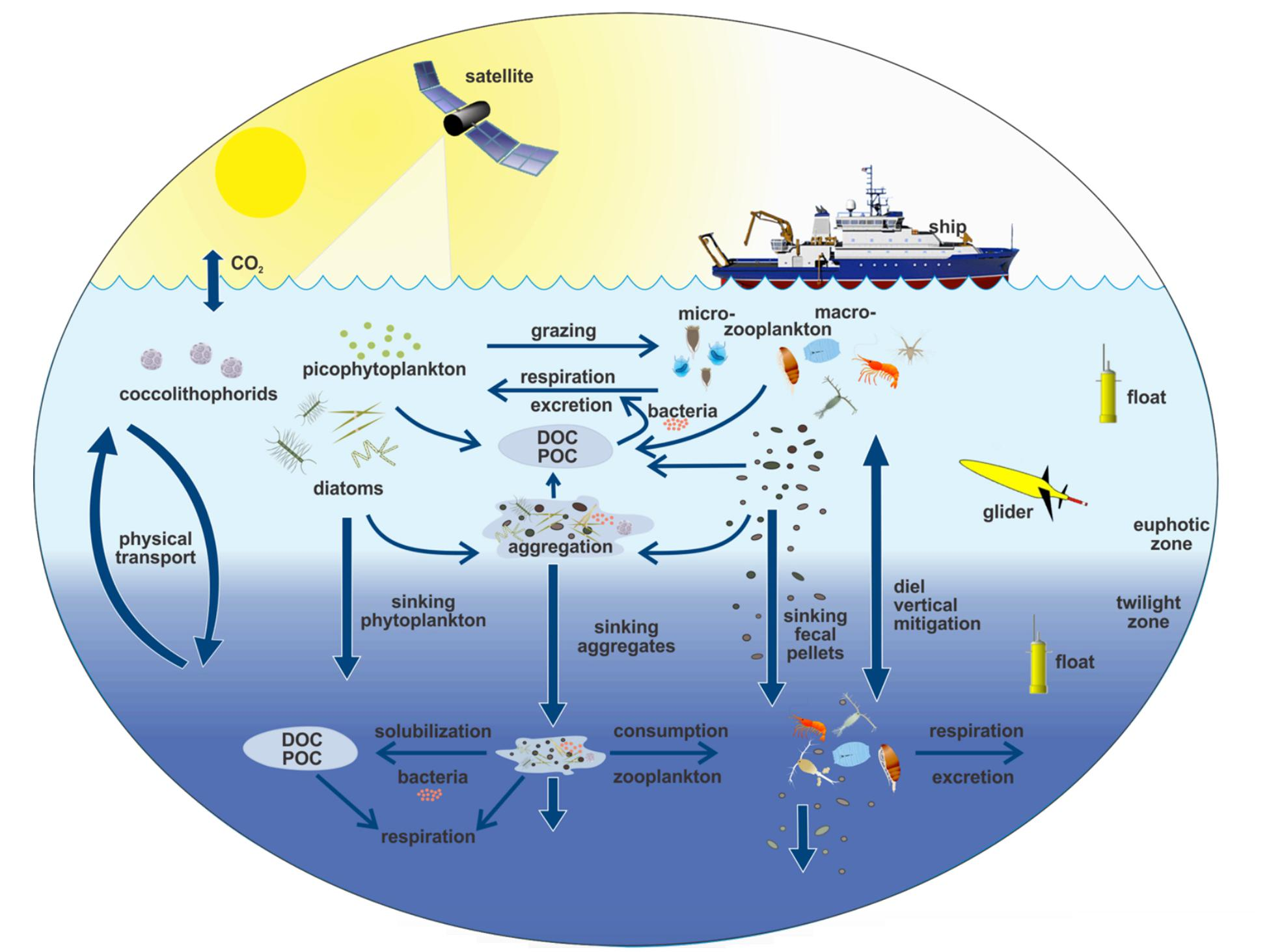
Schematic of processes that need to be measured to fully understand ocean productivity and carbon sequestration. Many of these topics involve optical measurements.

== Major contributing scientists ==
Oceanographers, physicists, and other scientists who have made major contributions to the field of ocean optics include (incomplete list):

David Antoine, Marcel Babin, Paula Bontempi, Emmanuel Boss, Annick Bricaud, Kendall Carder, Ivona Cetinic, Edward Fry, Heidi Dierssen, David Doxaran, Gene Carl Feldman, Howard Gordon, Chuanmin Hu, Nils Gunnar Jerlov, George Kattawar, John Kirk, ZhongPing Lee, Hubert Loisel, Stephane Maritorena, Michael Mishchenko, Curtis Mobley, Bruce Monger, Andre Morel, Michael Morris, Norm Nelson, Mary Jane Perry, Rudolph Preisendorfer, Louis Prieur, Chandrasekhara Raman, Collin Roesler, Rüdiger Röttgers, David Siegel, Raymond Smith, Heidi Sosik, Dariusz Stramski, Michael Twardowski, Talbot Waterman, Jeremy Werdell, Ken Voss, Charles Yentsch, and Ronald Zaneveld.

== Education ==
While ocean optics is an interdisciplinary field of study applies to a wide range of topics, it is not often taught as a course in graduate programs for marine science and oceanography. Two summer-term courses have been developed for graduate students from many different institutions. First, there is a summer lecture series operated by the International Ocean Colour Coordinating Group (IOCCG) which usually takes place in France. Second, there is an ongoing course in the United States called the “Optical Oceanography Class” or “Ocean Optics Class” in Washington State and later in Maine, which has been running continuously since 1985.

For independent learning, Curt Mobley, Collin Roesler, and Emmanuel Boss wrote the Ocean Optics Web Book as an open-access online guide.

== See also ==
Related fields and topics:

- Atmospheric optics
- Color of water
- Electromagnetic spectrum
- History of optics
- Oceanography
- Ocean color
- Optical depth
- Spectral color
- Transparency and translucency
- Visible spectrum
- Water clarity
- Water remote sensing
- Water quality

Inherent and apparent optical properties and in-water methods:

- Absorption (electromagnetic radiation)
- Argo (oceanography)
- Attenuation coefficient
- Beer-Lambert Law
- Marine optical buoy
- Scattering
- Secchi disk

Remote sensing and radiometric methods:

- Albedo
- Atmospheric correction
- NASA Earth Science
- Spectralon
