= Mary Voytek =

Director of NASA Astrobiology Program and USGS microbiologist

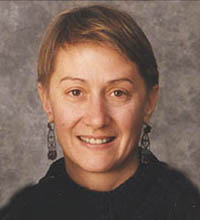
- 2004

Director of the National Aeronautics and Space Administration Astrobiology Program
- Incumbent
- Assumed office September 15, 2008
- President: Barack Obama; Donald Trump
- Website: astrobiology.nasa.gov/nai/directory/voytek-mary/
- Scientific career
- Education: Johns Hopkins University (BS); University of Rhode Island (MS); University of California, Santa Cruz (Phd)
- Fields: Astrobiology; Aquatic microbial ecology; Biogeochemistry
- Institutions: United States Geological Survey; NASA
- Thesis: Relative abundance and species diversity of autotrophic ammonia-oxidizing bacteria in aquatic systems (1996)
- Doctoral advisor: Bess Ward

Dr. Mary A. Voytek is the Exobiology Branch Chief at NASA's Ames Research Center, and the former director of the National Aeronautics and Space Administration (NASA) Astrobiology Program at NASA Headquarters in Washington, D.C. In 2015, Voytek formed Nexus for Exoplanet System Science (NExSS), a systems science initiative by NASA, to search for life on exoplanets. Voytek came to NASA from the U.S. Geological Survey in Reston, VA, where she headed the USGS Microbiology and Molecular Ecology Laboratory from 1998 to 2009.

== Education ==
B.A. in biology, Johns Hopkins University, 1980

M.S. in Biological Oceanography, University of Rhode Island, 1984

Ph.D. in Biology/Ocean Sciences, University of California, 1995

Postdoctoral Fellow, Rutgers University Institute for Marine and Coastal Sciences, 1995–1997

== Research and Professional Activities ==
Voytek's primary scientific interests are biogeochemistry and aquatic microbial ecology; more particularly, environmental controls on microbial transformations of nutrients, xenobiotics, and metals in freshwater and marine systems. She has worked in several extreme environments, including Antarctica, hypersaline lakes, deep-sea hydrothermal vents, and terrestrial deep-subsurface sites. Voytek has conducted deep biosphere studies at the Chesapeake Bay Impact Structure.

Voytek was a staff scientist at the Environmental Defense Fund (1987–1990) prior to completing her PhD at the University of Rhode Island. After her postdoc at Rutgers University she was a visiting research fellow at the Max Planck Institute for Limnology in Plön, Germany from 1997 to 1998. Voytek joined the U.S. Geological Survey (USGS) National Research Program in 1998 where she led the Microbiology and Molecular Ecology team until 2009. She was an invited scholar for the German-American Frontiers of Science (1997 and 2001), and she received a USGS Superior Service Award in 2005. She took charge of the NASA Astrobiology Program on September 15, 2008, as Interim Senior Scientist for Astrobiology in the Science Mission Directorate at NASA Headquarters.

Voytek has been a member of the American Geophysical Union since 1990, and she served as the secretary of the AGU Biogeosciences section from 2004 to 2006 and was the Biogeosciences section meeting chair from 2003 to 2006. She is currently a board member of the American Geophysical Union. Voytek is also a member of the American Society of Limnology and Oceanography (ASLO) (1984 to present) and the American Society of Microbiology (1991 to present).

She has served on several advisory groups to Department of the Interior, Department of Energy, the National Science Foundation, and NASA, including the Planetary Protection Subcommittee. She has also supported NASA's Astrobiology Program serving as a NASA representative to a number of COSPAR convened studies exploring the potential for life in the universe. She has held positions in several science societies.

In December 2010, she defended a news release of NASA on the possibility there might be a principally wider basis of life than so far assumed, following conclusions of a study by Felisa Wolfe-Simon on the arsenic-eating bacterium GFAJ-1, as presenting a "phenomenal finding".

== Publications ==
Voytek has been an author or co-author on over 70 peer-reviewed publications in interdisciplinary journals.

Her top 5 most cited publications are:

1. Groffman, PM; Altabet, MA; Böhlke, JK; Butterbach-Bahl, K; David, MB; Firestone, MK; Giblin, AE; Kana, TM; Nielsen, LP; Voytek, MA (2006). "Methods for measuring denitrification: diverse approaches to a difficult problem". Ecol Appl. 16 (6): 2091–122. CiteSeerX 10.1.1.550.1423. doi:10.1890/1051-0761(2006)016[2091:mfmdda]2.0.co;2. PMID 17205891..
2. Priscu, J.C.; Adams, E.E.; Lyons, W.B.; Voytek, M.A.; Mogk, D.W.; Brown, R.L.; McKay, C.P.; Takacs, C.D.; Welch, K.A.; Wolf, C.F.; Kirshtein, J.D. (1999). "Geomicrobiology of subglacial ice above Lake Vostok, Antarctica". Science. 286 (5447): 2141–2144. doi:10.1126/science.286.5447.2141. PMID 10591642.
3. Wallenstein, MD; Myrold, DD; Firestone, M; Voytek, M (2006). "Environmental controls on denitrifying communities and denitrification rates: insights from molecular methods". Ecol Appl. 16 (6): 2143–52. doi:10.1890/1051-0761(2006)016[2143:ecodca]2.0.co;2. PMID 17205893..
4. Voytek, MA; Ward, BB (1995). "Detection of ammonium-oxidizing bacteria of the beta-subclass of the class Proteobacteria in aquatic samples with the PCR". Applied and Environmental Microbiology. 61 (7): 1444–1450. Bibcode:1995ApEnM..61.1444V. doi:10.1128/AEM.61.4.1444-1450.1995. PMC 167558. PMID 7618898.
5. Reysenbach, A.L.; Liu, Y.; Banta, A.B.; Beveridge, T.J.; Kirshtein, J.D.; Schouten, S.; Tivey, M.K.; Von Damm, K.L.; Voytek, M.A. (2006). "A ubiquitous thermoacidophilic archaeon from deep-sea hydrothermal vents". Nature. 442 (7101): 444–447. Bibcode:2006Natur.442..444R. doi:10.1038/nature04921. hdl:1912/1408. PMID 16871216. S2CID 4315587.

Additional publications include:

- A Synopsis of Chesapeake Bay research. With Ian Morris, Sarah E. Libourel Houde, and Wayne Harrell Bell. Center for Environmental and Estuarine Studies, University of Maryland System, 1988
- Ominous future under the ozone hole: assessing biological impacts in Antarctica. Environmental Defense Fund, Wildlife Program, 1989
- Relative abundance and species diversity of autotrophic ammonia-oxidizing bacteria in aquatic systems. University of California, Santa Cruz 1996
- Molecular ecology of aquatic communities. With J. P. Zehr, 1999
- Preliminary assessment of microbial communities and biodegradation of chlorinated volatile organic compounds in wetlands at Cluster 13, Lauderick Creek area, Aberdeen Proving Ground, Maryland. With Michelle M. Lorah and Tracey A. Spencer. U.S. Dept. of the Interior, U.S. Geological Survey, 2003
