= Collin Roesler =

American oceanographer

- Education: University of Washington, PhD Oregon State University, MS Brown University, BS
- Scientific career
- Fields: Optical oceanography
- Workplaces: Bowdoin College
- Thesis: The determination of In situ phytoplankton spectral absorption coefficients : direct measurements, modeled estimates, and applications to bio-optical modeling in libraries (WorldCat catalog) (1992)
- Doctoral advisor: Mary Jane Perry

Collin Roesler is an American oceanographer. She is known for her work on optical oceanography, including research on harmful algal blooms in the Gulf of Maine and green icebergs.

== Education ==
Roesler earned her PhD at the University of Washington, where she studied satellite measurement of phytoplankton concentrations. She grew up in Colorado.

== Career ==
Roesler is a Professor of Earth and Oceanographic Science at Bowdoin College. She has varied research interests, with her main focus on optical oceanography techniques, like remote sensing. As part of that work, she has investigated harmful algal blooms, icebergs, and carbon cycling. Her 2019 research on green icebergs, published in Journal of Geophysical Research, was of particular interest in the popular media.

She collaborates with McLane Research Laboratories, researchers at Woods Hole Oceanographic Institution, and works on several NASA projects. As of 2019, she is working on NASA's Plankton, Aerosol, Cloud, ocean Ecosystem (PACE) satellite mission, which will measure the color of the ocean to advance biogeochemistry and carbon cycle research. PACE is scheduled to launch in 2022.

Roesler has spent more than 300 days at sea on research cruises.

=== Liberal arts ===
Roesler is passionate about climate science and environmental justice, telling The Bowdoin Orient, "I think we need to be thinking really seriously about how we are going to care for our communities that are going to be more impacted than others.” With support from NASA, Roesler helped create Ocean Optics Web Book, a community resource for optical oceanography and remote sensing communities. She also credits art with making her a better scientific observer.
