= Hans Pettersson =

Swedish physicist and oceanographer

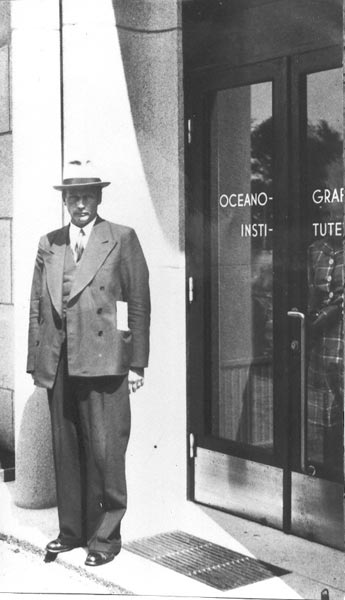
- Hans Pettersson around 1939
- Born: 26 August 1888; Forshälla, Gothenburg and Bohus County
- Died: 25 January 1966 (aged 77); Gothenburg
- Education: Institute for Radium Research, Vienna
- Awards: Fellow of the Royal Society (1956); Member of Royal Swedish Academy of Sciences

Prof Hans Pettersson FRSFor HFRSE RSAS (1888–1966) was a 20th-century Swedish physicist and oceanographer.

== Early life ==
Hans Pettersson was born in Forshalla near Gothenburg on 26 August 1888, the son of the chemist and oceanographer Otto Pettersson (1848-1941). He studied Sciences at Uppsala University, graduating in 1909. He then studied atomic physics as a postgraduate at the Institute for Radium Research, Vienna.

== Career ==
Pettersson's first publication from 1910 was on the issue of radium.

In 1913 he joined the staff of the Swedish Hydrographic-Biological Commission. In 1914 he began lecturing in Oceanography at University of Gothenburg.

He later brought this knowledge to the field of oceanography, and with the help of radium he could determine the age of sediment samples from the bottom of the sea. Pettersson became the first full professor of oceanography in Sweden and in 1938 founded the Institute of Oceanography in Gothenburg, thanks to funding from the Knut and Alice Wallenberg Foundation. Pettersson was its head until 1956. He also was the head of the Bornö Hydrographic Field Station on Stora Bornö.

In 1956, aged 68, he became Professor of Geophysics at the University of Hawaii.

Pettersson also wrote many popular scientific texts which helped disseminate progress in oceanography to the general audience. In July 1947, the Albatross expedition started its around the world voyage with Pettersson as leader of the expedition. This expedition was planned by him, and was financed by private sponsors.

He died in Gothenburg on 25 January 1966.

== Publications ==
- Westward Ho with the Albatross (1953)

== Awards and honours ==
- 1947 elected an Honorary Fellow of the Royal Society of Edinburgh.
- 1948 elected as a member of the Royal Swedish Academy of Sciences.
- 1949 awarded the Patron's Medal of the Royal Geographical Society.
- 1950 elected Foreign Member of the Finnish Society of Sciences and Letters.
- 1956 elected a Foreign Member of the Royal Society of London (ForMemRS) in 1956.
