= Sarah Fawcett =

South African oceanographer and climatologist

- Born: Benoni, Gauteng, South Africa
- Education: Harvard University (Earth and planetary science 2006); Princeton University (PhD, 2012)
- Occupations: Oceanographer and climatologist
- Employer: University of Cape Town

Sarah Fawcett is a South African oceanographer and climatologist. A senior lecturer in the Department of Oceanography at the University of Cape Town, she is particularly interested in the role of oceans in regulating biogeochemical cycles and how their dysregulation contributes to climate change. She was honoured in the World Economic Forum Young Scientists Class of 2020, and a P-Rating from the National Research Foundation, which recognizes that the scientist's work will likely have high impact.

== Early life ==
Fawcett was born in Benoni, Gauteng, and attended Benoni High School. She went on to study Earth and planetary science at Harvard University (2006) and completed a PhD at Princeton University (2012) where she later held a postdoctoral fellowship (2012–2015).

== Career ==
In 2015, Fawcett was appointed a lecturer in oceanography at the University of Cape Town. She has worked to build up a diverse research group, aware of the discrimination still faced by female scientists. From 2016, she has participated in the SEAmester scheme that aims to train up postdoctoral oceanography researchers.

In her doctorate, Fawcett investigated the relationship between nitrogen and populations of phytoplankton in upwelling ecosystems of the Sargasso Sea. She has continued to work on these relationships, concentrating on the subpolar North Atlantic and Southern Ocean as areas of particular importance. The sequestration of carbon through the biological pump in these regions may be an important regulatory of the global ocean system, but the dynamics of the nitrogen-phytoplankton system limit its efficiency. Much of Fawcett's works is based on measurements of stable nitrogen isotopes. Fawcett is also addressing the lack of research in the Benguela Upwelling System, which is important for the biodiversity and economy of the region. She is also primary investigator for the Antarctic Circumnavigation Expedition (ACE).

In 2017, she received the South African Network for Coastal and Oceanic Research (SANCOR) Young Researchers Award and the Claude Leon Merit Award for Early-Career Researchers. She was also distinguished as one of the Top 200 Young South Africans by the Mail and Guardian and received a NRF P-rating meaning her early career had suggested she would go on to become "a future international leader in [her] field". In 2018, the University of Cape Town awarded her its College of Fellows Young Researcher Award. In 2020, the World Economic Forum added Fawcett to its group of 25 young researchers at the "forefront of scientific discovery" for that year on account of her research on "ocean chemistry and biology in climate" and the "impacts of human activities on marine environments."

== Select publications ==
- Katye E. Altieri; Sarah E Fawcett; Andrew J Peters; Sigman, Daniel; Hastings, Meredith (2016). "Marine biogenic source of atmospheric organic nitrogen in the subtropical North Atlantic". Proceedings of the National Academy of Sciences of the United States of America. 113 (4): 925–930. Bibcode:2016PNAS..113..925A. doi:10.1073/pnas.1516847113. PMC 4743774. PMID 26739561. Wikidata Q36551534.
- Hutchinson, Katherine; Julie Deshayes; Jean-Baptiste Sallée; et al. (2020). "Water Mass Characteristics and Distribution Adjacent to Larsen C Ice Shelf, Antarctica". Journal of Geophysical Research: Oceans. 125 (4). Bibcode:2020JGRC..12515855H. doi:10.1029/2019jc015855. Wikidata Q114651293.
- Bonnet, Sophie; Berthelot, Hugo; Kendra Turk-Kubo; Sarah Fawcett; Eyal Rahav; Stéphane L'Helguen; Berman, Ilana (2016). "Dynamics of N2 fixation and fate of diazotroph-derived nitrogen in a low-nutrient, low-chlorophyll ecosystem: results from the VAHINE mesocosm experiment (New Caledonia)". Biogeosciences. 13 (9): 2653–2673. Bibcode:2016BGeo...13.2653B. doi:10.5194/bg-13-2653-2016. Wikidata Q60726774.
