= Albatross expedition =

Swedish oceanographic expedition in 1947 and 1948

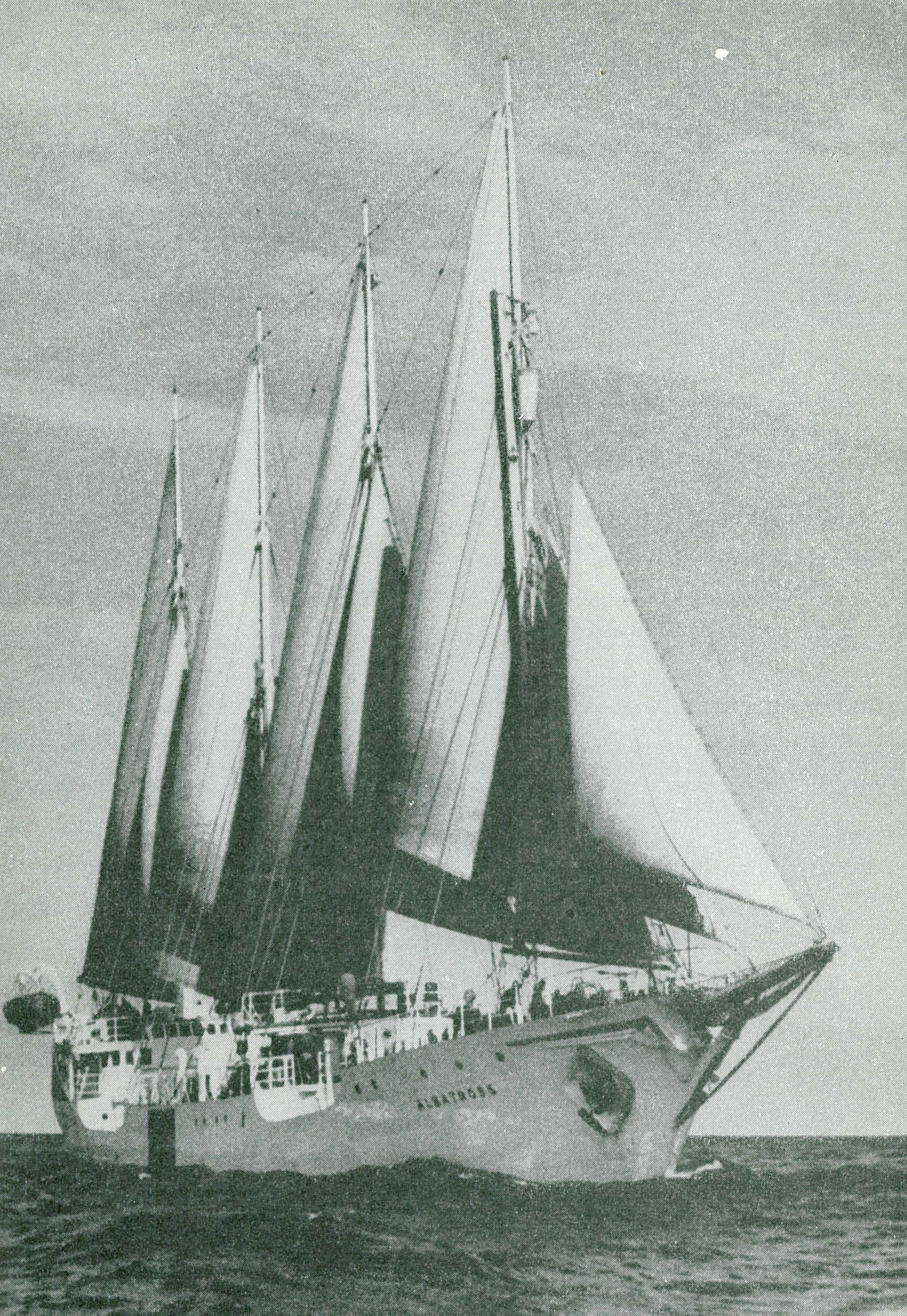
The Albatross

The Albatross expedition (Albatrossexpeditionen) was a Swedish oceanographic expedition that between July 4, 1947, and October 3, 1948, sailed around the world for 15 months covering 45 000 nautical miles. The expedition is considered the second largest Swedish research expedition after the Vega expedition. The expedition was very successful, received international attention, and is considered one of the important steps in the history of oceanography.

== The Albatross ==
The expedition was carried out on board the newly built training ship Albatross. The 70 meter long and 11 meter wide vessel was a combined motor and sailing vessel. The Boström line (Broströmskoncernen) had just built the student ship to train prospective ship's officers and this vessel with associated crew was lent to the expedition.

Since the Boström line lent the ship at almost no cost, the expedition could be financed and carried out with only private donations. The leader of the expedition was Swedish physicist and oceanographer Hans Pettersson.

The main task of the expedition was to take up to 20 m long sediment cores from the ocean floor. This was made using a newly developed corer, known as piston sampler, developed by Börje Kullenberg. Until then the longest cores that could be taken were 2 m.

The expedition also carried out the first seismic reflection measurements of the sediment thickness, using sink bombs. The results of the sediment studies were ground-breaking since they revealed that the sediment thickness increased away from the mid-oceanic ridges, along with the sediment accumulation time. This was one of several pieces of evidence that eventually led to the acceptance of the theory of plate tectonics. Apart from sediments, the expedition looked at biology. The first deep sea trawling, at 7 600-7 900 m depth, revealed that those depths were not the dead zone that previously had been the accepted view.

== Other sources ==
- Hans Pettersson (1950) Med Albatross över havsdjupen (Stockholm: Bonnier)
- Eric Olausson (1996) The Swedish Deep-Sea Expedition with the "Albatross" 1947-1948 (Novum, Grafiska AB)
