= The Oceanography Society =

American nonprofit society

The Oceanography Society (TOS) is a nonprofit society founded in 1988, based in Rockville, Maryland, U.S. and incorporated in the District of Columbia. It is an oceanographical organization that aims to promote communication among oceanographers, spread knowledge through research and education, and to provide a constituency for building consensus amongst the sub-disciplines of the field. The society publishes the scientific journal Oceanography, which publishes articles on all oceanic disciplines.

== History ==
The idea for forming an oceanographic society was hatched by a group of scientists, who approached both the American Geophysical Union and the American Meteorological Society with the idea. The two groups both responded positively, leading to several oceanographic events at the time. However, the need developed for the creation of an independent community, resulting in the formation of the Oceanography Society in March 1988. These early developments by the society were paralleled by developments in the Challenger Society for Marine Science.

== Awards ==
The Oceanography Society gives out three awards—the Jerlov Award, the Walter Munk Medal, and the Oceanography Society Fellows Program.

=== Jerlov Award ===
The Jerlov Award is awarded by the society biennially "in recognition of the contribution made to the advancement of our knowledge of the nature and consequences of light in the ocean" and to "recognize outstanding achievements in ocean optics and ocean color remote sensing research".

It is named after Nils Gunnar Jerlov, an early leader in the area of ocean optics research. Jerlov's work on ocean optical and other similar processes helped to create modern ocean optical research. His book Marine Optics, published in 1976, is still widely referenced by other sources and is read by students of ocean optics and ocean color sensing.

Recipients have been:

- 2020 – Edward S. Fry
- 2018 – Annick Bricaud
- 2016 – Curtis Mobley
- 2014 – George W. Kattawar
- 2012 – Kendall L. Carder
- 2010 – Charles S. Yentsch
- 2008 – Talbot Waterman
- 2006 – J. Ronald V. Zaneveld
- 2004 – Howard R. Gordon
- 2002 – Raymond C. Smith
- 2000 – André Morel

=== Walter Munk Medal ===
The Walter Munk Award was "awarded in recognition of distinguished research in oceanography related to sound and the sea".

It is named after Walter Munk, the first recipient in 1993. The award is given by the society jointly with the Office of Naval Research and the Office of the Oceanographer of the Navy.

Since 2019, it has been reestablished as the Walter Munk Medal to be awarded biennially "to an individual ocean scientist for extraordinary accomplishments and novel insights in the area of physical oceanography, ocean acoustics, or marine geophysics".

Recipients have been:

- 2019 – Larry Mayer
- 2017 – Andone Lavery
- 2015 – Carl Wunsch
- 2013 – W. Steven Holbrook
- 2011 – William Kuperman
- 2009 – James F. Lynch
- 2006 – Peter F. Worcester
- 2003 – H. Thomas Rossby
- 2001 – Robert C. Spindel
- 1999 – Robert Pinkel
- 1997 – Stephen A. Thorpe
- 1996 – Leonid M. Brekhovskikh
- 1994 – David M. Farmer
- 1993 – Walter Munk

=== Oceanography Society Fellows Program ===
The Fellows Program "recognizes individuals who have attained eminence in oceanography through their outstanding contributions to the field of oceanography or its applications during a substantial period of years". Individuals in the Society can be elected as a TOS Fellow with outstanding contributions to the field of oceanography as well as devotion to the field. An individual is usually considered for nomination after he or she has been a member of the society for at least three years.

== Journal ==
Oceanography is published quarterly—every March, June, September, and December. It contains peer-reviewed articles on many aspects of ocean science. The journal was first published in 1988; all of its issues are available both in print and online as PDF files.
