= Wally Fulweiler =

American marine biogeochemist

Robinson W. Fulweiler
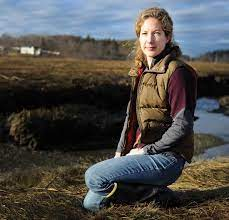
- Education: University of Rhode Island
- Scientific career
- Thesis: The impact of climate change on benthic-pelagic coupling and the biogeochemical cycling of Narragansett Bay, R.I. (2007)

Robinson W. "Wally" Fulweiler is an American marine biogeochemist.

== Education and career ==
Fulweiler received her undergraduate degree in international studies from the University of Vermont in 2000. In 2003, she earned her M.S. in oceanography from the University of Rhode Island, and completed her Ph.D. in 2007 under the advising of Scott Nixon. In 2008 she joined the faculty at Boston University where she was promoted to professor in 2021.

== Research ==
Fulweiler is known for her research in nutrients and energy flow in marine environments. Her early work centered on Narragansett Bay where she worked on the impact of warming in the bay and on the role bacteria play in adding nitrogen to the bay. She has worked on the fluxes of silica, and carbon. Her work on nitrogen includes research into nitrogen runoff, the factors controlling nitrogen in the environment, and the incorporation of nitrogen cycling into biogeochemical models.

Beyond her academic research, Fulweiler speaks to the impact of COVID on women in science, higher education, and the intersection of science and politics.

== Selected publications ==
- Fulweiler, R. W.; Nixon, S. W.; Buckley, B. A.; Granger, S. L. (2007). "Reversal of the net dinitrogen gas flux in coastal marine sediments". Nature. 448 (7150): 180–182. Bibcode:2007Natur.448..180F. doi:10.1038/nature05963. ISSN 0028-0836. PMID 17625562. S2CID 4426161.
- Nixon, Scott W.; Fulweiler, Robinson W.; Buckley, Betty A.; Granger, Stephen L.; Nowicki, Barbara L.; Henry, Kelly M. (2009-03-20). "The impact of changing climate on phenology, productivity, and benthic–pelagic coupling in Narragansett Bay". Estuarine, Coastal and Shelf Science. 82 (1): 1–18. Bibcode:2009ECSS...82....1N. doi:10.1016/j.ecss.2008.12.016. ISSN 0272-7714.
- Groffman, Peter M.; Butterbach-Bahl, Klaus; Fulweiler, Robinson W.; Gold, Arthur J.; Morse, Jennifer L.; Stander, Emilie K.; Tague, Christina; Tonitto, Christina; Vidon, Philippe (2009). "Challenges to incorporating spatially and temporally explicit phenomena (hotspots and hot moments) in denitrification models". Biogeochemistry. 93 (1–2): 49–77. Bibcode:2009Biogc..93...49G. doi:10.1007/s10533-008-9277-5. ISSN 0168-2563. S2CID 45386795.
- Fulweiler, R. W.; Brown, S. M.; Nixon, S. W.; Jenkins, B. D. (2013-05-22). "Evidence and a conceptual model for the co‑occurrence of nitrogen fixation and denitrification in heterotrophic marine sediments". Marine Ecology Progress Series. 482: 57–68. Bibcode:2013MEPS..482...57F. doi:10.3354/meps10240. ISSN 0171-8630.

== Awards and honors ==
In 2012, Fulweiler was awarded a Sloan Research Fellowship. In 2013, she received the Cronin Award from the Coastal and Estuarine Research Federation. In 2015 the University of Rhode Island recognized Fulweiler as a rising star, and in 2016 she was named a fellow of the Association for the Sciences of Limnology and Oceanography. In 2024, Fulweiler was selected as a Pivot Fellow by the Simons Foundation.
