= Scott W. Nixon =

20th-century ecologist

- Born: 1943
- Died: May 21, 2012 (aged 68–69)
- Education: University of Delaware, University of North Carolina at Chapel Hill
- Scientific career
- Fields: Coastal and estuarine ecology
- Workplaces: University of Rhode Island
- Thesis: Characteristics of Some Hypersaline Systems
- Academic advisors: Howard T. Odum
- Notable students: Sybil P. Seitzinger, Wally Fulweiler

Scott W. Nixon (1943 – May 21, 2012) was an ecosystem ecologist whose research primarily focused on nitrogen and eutrophication in coastal and estuarine ecosystems. He was the first to clearly define coastal eutrophication. Nixon was a faculty member of the University of Rhode Island’s Graduate School of Oceanography from 1969 until his death. Throughout his life, he also served important roles in many organizations and committees, including as the director of Rhode Island Sea Grant, editor-in-chief of Estuaries, and a member of the National Research Council's Ocean Studies Board.

== Education ==
In 1965, Nixon obtained a Bachelor of Arts degree in biology from the University of Delaware. Under the mentorship of Howard T. Odum, he received a doctorate in Botany from the University of North Carolina in Chapel Hill in 1970. His dissertation discussed field and laboratory microcosm results from salinas in Puerto Rico.

== Career ==
Identified by the dean John Knauss as having potential, Nixon was hired by the University of Rhode Island's Graduate School of Oceanography as a research associate a year prior to obtaining his doctorate and began working as an assistant professor in 1970. In his early days at the University of Rhode Island, Nixon worked with Candace Oviatt and Michael Pilson, eventually starting the Marine Ecosystem Research Lab together in 1976. MERL is home to several mesocosms, where long term experiments on Narragansett Bay are performed.

Nixon was an elected member of the board of Association for the Sciences of Limnology and Oceanography from 1984 – 1987. He was the coordinator, then director of the Rhode Island Sea Grant from 1986 – 2000. An active member of the Coastal and Estuarine Research Federation, he was editor-in-chief of their journal Estuaries from 1988 – 2005 and additionally an editor on the Journal of Sea Research from 1999 until his death. He additionally participated in the New England Estuarine Research Society. He was appointed the UNESCO/Cousteau Chair in Coastal Ecology and Global Assessment in 2004 and was a long time participant in committees for the National Research Council performing review and advisory for a variety of coastal scientific and restorative projects.

Nixon advised 37 graduate students during his career, while additionally working with 4 students at the time of his death.

Nixon was known to value performing research that could be applied to restoration efforts and met the needs of the affected communities, and was active in service activities with those who worked on coastal management, considering alternatives in a way that had him sometimes labeled contrarian. Nixon had a reputation for his skill in communicating difficult scientific concepts to a general audience and recontextualizing research to find where it fit in the bigger picture.

The University of Rhode Island's Coastal Institute holds the Scott W. Nixon Lecture on coastal research annually in his honor, choosing speakers whose research re-examines scientific consensus.

== Research ==
Nixon's first research often collaborated with Oviatt and focused mainly on the ecology of estuaries and salt marshes near the University of Rhode Island campus, including field studies on the metabolisms of mussels, eelgrass, and fish. Bissel Cove and other locations throughout Narragansett Bay were frequent sites of interest. The collaboration between Nixon and Oviatt on a whole-ecosystem study of Bissel Cove was one of the first whole-ecosystem studies published.

In 1972, Nixon and Oviatt began to more closely study carbon and nitrogen in Bissel Cove. After this, Nixon began to depart from mostly studying metabolisms of specific coastal marine species to studying nutrient dynamics in coastal marine environments, especially their sediments.

In 1977, Nixon published a book with fellow field ecologist James Kremer of the University of Connecticut on using computers to create an ecosystem model for Narragansett Bay. The book, A Coastal Marine Ecosystem, was intended to help connect ecologists with numerical modeling.

In some of his earliest work on eutrophic systems, Nixon published a report for the Rhode Island Water Resources center on the Pettaquamscutt River’s Upper Pond in 1981. He delved further into the nitrogen cycle and eutrophication with several papers during the early 1980s, oftentimes second author to one of his graduate students, like Sybil Seitzinger and Veronica Berounsky.

In the later 1980s, Nixon began to broaden his scope. In his earlier career, Nixon rarely strayed from studies outside the Narragansett Bay area, but he began to perform a study on Chesapeake Bay, wrote a literature review on lakes, coasts, and oceans around the world, and contributed to a special edition of Ambio on marine eutrophication discussing its international significance.

Nixon published fewer papers in the 1990s, but published one of his most significant in 1995 defining the growing international problem of coastal eutrophication. This paper clearly identified and separated the causes of coastal eutrophication from its indicators.

== Awards ==
- Bostwick H. Ketchum Award for Coastal Excellence from Woods Hole Oceanographic Institute, 1992
- Odum Lifetime Achievement Award from the Estuarine Research Federation, 2003
- Posthumous Distinguished Naturalist from the Rhode Island Natural History Survey, 2013
- Citation for Scientific Excellence from the Association for the Sciences of Limnology and Oceanography, 2013
