= D'Elía =

D'Elía is a last name, which may reference to:

- Bill D'Elia, American screenwriter, producer, director and actor
- Carlos D'Elia (or Carlos César Delía; 1923–2014), Argentine equestrian and a brigade general
- Cecilia D'Elia (born 1963), Italian politician
- Chris D'Elia, American comedian and actor
- Christopher D'Elia, American marine biologist
- Elena D'Elia (born 2005), Italian singer-songwriter
- Fabio D'Elia (born 1983), Liechtenstein football midfielder of Italian origin
- Federico D'Elía, Argentine actor
- Jorge D'Elía, Argentine actor
- José D'Elía, Uruguayan labor leader
- Luis D'Elía, Argentine holocaust denier
- Salvatore D'Elia (born 1989), Italian footballer
- Sergio D'Elia (born 1952), Italian politician, activist and former left-wing terrorist
- Silvina D'Elía, Argentine field hockey player
- Sofia Black-D'Elia (born 1991), American actress
- Toshiko D'Elia (1930-2014), American Masters athletics long-distance running legend
- William D'Elia (born 1946), also known as "Big Billy", Pennsylvania mobster and former leader of the Bufalino crime family
