= LJL =

LJL may refer to:

- Liquid Jungle Lab, a tropical marine research station on Panama
- League of Legends Japan League, the top level of professional League of Legends competition in Japan
- Renault Arkana LJL, a version of the Renault Arkana
