= Atlantic Estuarine Research Society =

- AERS logo
- Abbreviation: AERS
- Formation: 1949
- President: Shelley Sullivan Katsuki
- Parent organization: Coastal and Estuarine Research Federation
- Website: http://www.aers.info

The Atlantic Estuarine Research Society (AERS) is an association of researchers and students with an interest in estuarine and coastal environmental issues and policies. The Atlantic Estuarine Research Society (AERS) brings together students, scientists, managers, and educators from the states of DE, MD, NC, NJ, PA, and VA and Washington, DC to discuss estuarine and coastal environmental issues and policies. It is our intent to foster broader interest in our environment by increasing public awareness of current issues.

It is affiliated with the national Coastal and Estuarine Research Federation which sponsors biennial conferences and produces a journal, Estuaries and Coasts.

== See also ==
- Estuary
- Chesapeake Bay
- Long Island Sound
