= Judy Weis =

Judy Weis may refer to

- Judith Weis, American scientist
- Jessica M. Weis, American politician
