= Judith Weis =

American marine biologist

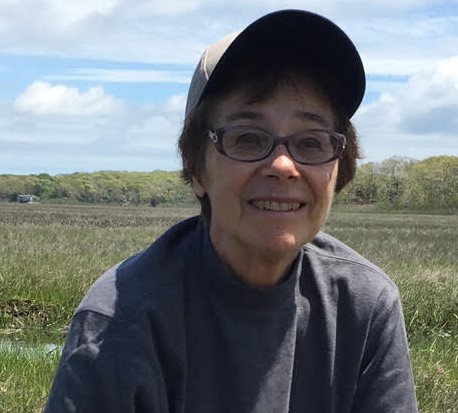
Judith Weis working in a salt marsh

Judith Shulman Weis (born May 29, 1941) is an American marine biologist. Her research and writing focuses on estuarine ecology and ecotoxicology, including the responses of salt marsh and brackish marsh organisms, populations and communities to stresses, particularly heavy metal contaminants, invasive species and parasites. She is also working to reduce the spread of microplastics in the environment and find solutions to protecting coastal marshes from sea level rise.

Weis is professor emerita of marine biology at Rutgers University, where she taught for five decades. She is a Fellow of the American Association for the Advancement of Science and chairs the Science Advisory Board of the NJ DEP, among other bodies.

== Early life and education ==
Weis was born and raised in New York City in a secular Jewish family. She graduated Bronx High School of Science in 1958 and earned her B.A. in 1962 from Cornell University, majoring in zoology. She received her M.S. in 1964 and Ph.D. in biology in 1967, both from New York University.

== Career ==
Weis had a summer internship in 1960, while in Cornell, at the Marine Biological Laboratory in Woods Hole, Massachusetts. Immediately after receiving her Ph.D., Weis joined the faculty of Rutgers University in Newark, New Jersey, in 1967, where she was promoted to Professor in 1976. In addition to teaching, she has conducted research on the threats faced by organisms in shallow coastal estuary environments, such as contamination from pollution, especially heavy metals, and invasive species. Much of her research has been with marine life in the New York–New Jersey Harbor area and the New Jersey Meadowlands, but she has also done research in Indonesia and Madagascar. In the 1970s, Weis and her children starred in a Tang orange drink commercial because General Foods was promoting the product with ads featuring female scientists with cute kids. During a sabbatical in 1983–1984, she received a Congressional Science Fellowship from the American Association for the Advancement of Science (AAAS) where she worked for the Environment and Public Works Committee of the US Senate. By publishing studies about how products such as pressure-treated wood used in bulkheads and pilings leach toxic metals into waterways, Weis has been able to influence laws and regulations that have led to manufacturers removing toxic metals from the products. Among the legislation that she has worked on were amendments to the Safe Drinking Water Act and Resource Conservation and Recovery Act.

Weis later served on advisory committees for the US EPA, National Sea Grant College Program of NOAA, and the New Jersey Department of Environmental Protection, where she chairs the Science Advisory Board. She co-chairs the Science and Technical Advisory Committee for the NY/NJ Harbor Estuary. She also serves on the Waterfront Management Advisory Board of New York City and the National Marine Team of the Sierra Club and Plastic Free Waters Partnership. Weis has served as president of the American Institute of Biological Sciences and volunteered with the Ecological Society of America, among other scientific bodies, and worked on the Intergovernmental Panel on Biodiversity and Ecosystem Services and other United Nations (UN) reports. Since 2020, she has again been coordinating the salt marsh chapter for the next iteration of the World Ocean Assessment for the UN. Earlier in her career, she became interested in the women's movement after an argument with a sexist colleague at Rutgers and soon became active with the National Organization for Women and has served on the board of the Association for Women in Science, among other activist organizations. In 2023, the conservation organization Mission Blue named the NY/NJ harbor estuary a "Hope Spot" and Weis a "Hope Spot Champion" for her "work to connect their community of urbanites with the natural world around them through campaigning for continued improvement in water quality, habitat restoration, and community engagement programs".

Weis is Professor Emerita of Biological Sciences at Rutgers where she taught for over five decades. She has published over 250 scientific papers and written several books about marine biology. She has been married to Peddrick "Pete" Weis since 1962. He is also an academic, and the couple have two children, Jennifer and Eric, and three grandchildren. Weis enjoys choral singing and performing in musical theatre and comic opera, including at the International Gilbert and Sullivan Festival.

== Research ==
In the 1970s, Weis studied mummichogs' response to methylmercury. When exposed to methylmercury, some females produced eggs that were severely deformed, while other females produced eggs that were normal or only mildly affected. In contrast, mummichogs from a polluted estuary, Piles Creek, in Linden, New Jersey, produced embryos that were practically all normal after being exposed to the same amount of methylmercury, showing that they were tolerant to the chemical. This research was the first finding of pollution tolerance in estuarine fish. Tolerance to mercury was also seen in adult grass shrimp and fiddler crabs in the creek. In the 1980s, Weis and her team found that, like the embryos, some sperm and eggs were also tolerant to mercury. Juvenile and adult mummichogs, however, were not mercury-tolerant, and furthermore they did not grow as big or live as long as fish from clean environments. They matures faster and produced (tolerant) embryos sooner. This research led to further studies showing that while various species in estuaries had adapted genetically to the pollutants, many individuals nevertheless developed liver problems and cancer. This in turn has led to efforts to clean up rivers and wetlands.

Later in the 1980s and 1990s, Weis and her team observed that adult mummichogs in the polluted estuary were slow to capture prey (grass shrimp) and were easier to catch by a predator (blue crabs). Most of their diet was detritus in the mud, which is not highly nutritious for them. Weis theorized that poor nutrition may have been partly responsible for their slow growth and reduced life span, and poor predator avoidance may have also been partly responsible for their reduced life span. The shrimp in Piles Creek were larger and more numerous than at clean sites, because their main predator, the mummichogs, were impaired. Other species from polluted estuaries (fiddler crabs, juvenile bluefish and blue crabs) also had altered behavior. Weis's later research in the New Jersey Meadowlands has shown, for example, that levels of mercury and other contaminants in sediment along the Hackensack River are so high that blue crabs, like the mummichogs, are slow at capturing live food (even though they are particularly aggressive), and eat a great deal of detritus, which is abnormal for a carnivorous crab. Juvenile bluefish ("snappers") there exhibit slower swimming speed and reduced prey capture, and grow more slowly than their counterparts in a clean environment. Fish captured in the Hackensack frequently have empty stomachs, which is highly unusual for this voracious species. Weis and her field research team documented, over the decades, the unhealthy effects of pollutants on the coastal species in Piles Creek and the Meadowlands, as compared with similar animals in the cleaner waters of Tuckerton, New Jersey. She concluded that, while the Clean Water Act has helped improve the quality of the environment in industrial areas in northern New Jersey, stronger regulation is needed.

Weis's habitat studies over the decades have included marine animal associations with mangroves and with salt marsh plants, comparing the native Spartina with the invasive reed Phragmites, showing that the invasive plant sequesters more metal pollutants than the native plant, without releasing them back into the environment. This invasive species (which is being removed in restoration projects) performs some services for the environment and should be managed more sensitively.

Weis led a study of the status of New Jersey coastal marshes with respect to sea level rise. It found that most coastal marshes, which protect local communities from flooding and storm surge, are not elevating as rapidly as the sea level is rising and are also losing acreage. The study, published in 2021, discussed four possible remedies: allowing marshes to migrate inland through pathways created by removing developments and structures, changing the management (removal) of the reed Phragmites, adding sediments on top of marshes to increase elevation, and building "living shorelines" that incorporate harder materials, like oyster reefs, at the marsh edge to reduce erosion.

== Bibliography ==
=== Books ===
- Salt Marshes: A Natural and Unnatural History (2009; with Carol A. Butler)
- Do Fish Sleep? (2011)
- Walking Sideways: The Remarkable World of Crabs (2012)
- Physiological, Developmental, and Behavioral Effects of Marine Pollution (2013)
- Marine Pollution: What Everyone Needs to Know (2014)
- Biological Invasions and Animal Behaviour (2016; co-edited with Daniel Sol)
- Polluting Textiles (2022; co-edited with Francesca De Falco and Mariacristina Cocca)

=== Selected articles ===
In addition to the papers cited in this entry, the following are selected articles by Weis:

- Weis, J. S., P. Weis, M. Heber and S. Vaidya (1981). "Methylmercury tolerance of killifish (Fundulus heteroclitus) embryos from a polluted vs. nonpolluted environment", Marine Biology, vol. 65, pp. 283–287
- Smith, G. and J. S. Weis (1997). "Predator/prey interactions of the mummichog, Fundulus heteroclitus: Effects of living in a polluted environment", Journal of Experimental Marine Biology and Ecology, vol. 209, pp. 75–87
- Zhou, T., H. John-Alder, P. Weis and J. S. Weis (1999). "Thyroidal status of mummichogs (Fundulus heteroclitus) from a polluted vs. a reference habitat", Environmental Toxicology and Chemistry, vol. 18, pp. 2817–2823
- Samson, J. C., S. Shumway and J. S. Weis (2008). "Effects of the toxic dinoflagellate Alexandrium fundyense on three species of larval fish: a food web approach", Journal of Fish Biology, vol. 72, pp. 168–188
- Bergey, L. and J. S Weis (2008). "Aspects of population ecology in two populations of fiddler crabs, Uca pugnax", Marine Biology, vol. 154, pp. 435–442
- Candelmo, A., A. Deshpande, B. Dockum, P. Weis and J. S. Weis (2010). "The effect of contaminated prey on feeding, activity, and growth of young-of-the-year bluefish, Pomatomus saltatrix, in the laboratory", Estuaries and Coasts, vol. 33, pp. 1025–1038

== Awards ==
- Fellow of AAAS (elected 1985)
- Governor's Science Advisory Committee, NJ
- Marine Board of the National Research Council, 1991
- Environmental Award from Accabonac Protection Committee, 1996
- Rutgers Class of 1962 Presidential Public Service Award, 2003–2004
- Fulbright Senior Specialist – Indonesia (Hasanuddin University, Makassar, South Sulawesi), May 2006
- Merit Award from the Society of Wetland Scientists, 2016
