= RV Tioga =

American coastal research vessel

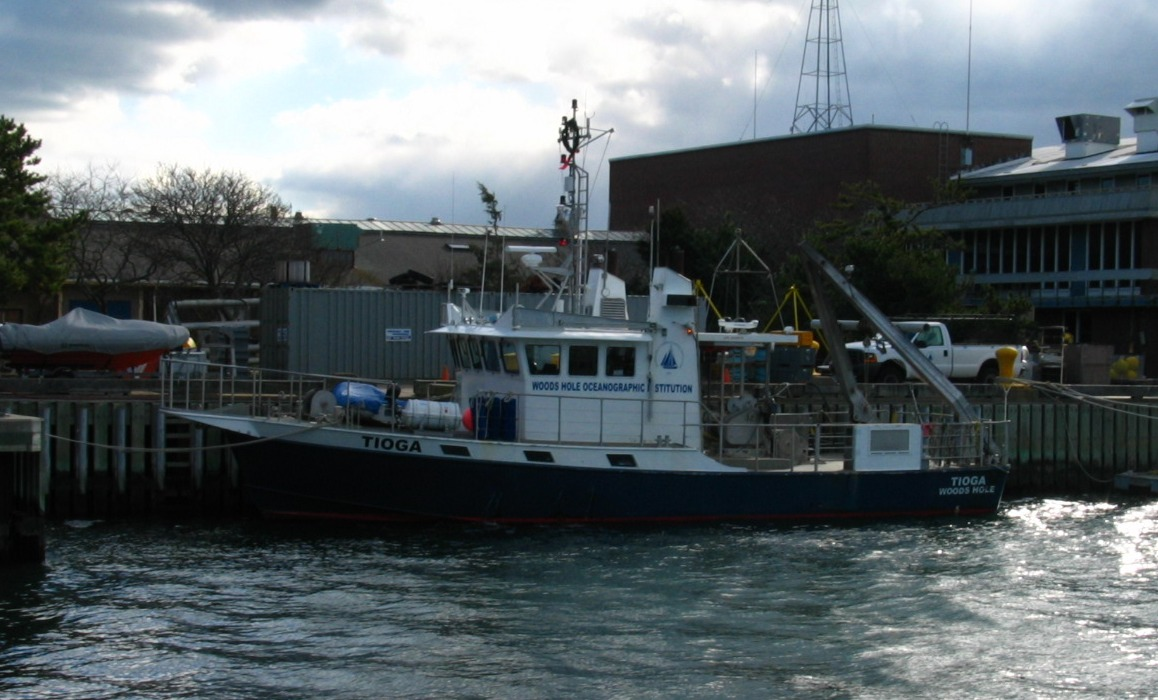
- RV Tioga in Woods Hole

History

United States
- Name: Tioga
- Owner: Woods Hole Oceanographic Institution
- Builder: Gladding-Hearn Shipbuilding, Somerset, Massachusetts
- Launched: April 2004
- Home port: Woods Hole, Massachusetts
- Identification: MMSI number: 366938840; Callsign: WDB7231
- Status: Active

General characteristics
- Type: Challenger-class research vessel
- Tonnage: 53 GT
- Length: 60 ft (18 m)
- Beam: 17 ft (5.2 m)
- Draft: 5 ft (1.5 m)
- Propulsion: 2 × 750 hp (559 kW) Detroit Diesel Series 60 engines
- Speed: 18 knots (33 km/h; 21 mph) cruising
- Range: 300 nmi (560 km; 350 mi)
- Endurance: Day Trips, 2–3 Days
- Capacity: 10+ for day trips, sleeps 4 scientists on overnight cruises
- Complement: 2
- Sensors & processing systems: ADCP, CTD, TSG Flow-Through, Meteorological Sensors, Depth Sounders, Large A-Frame with removable crossbar for deploying large gear, CTD Winch, Trawl Winch

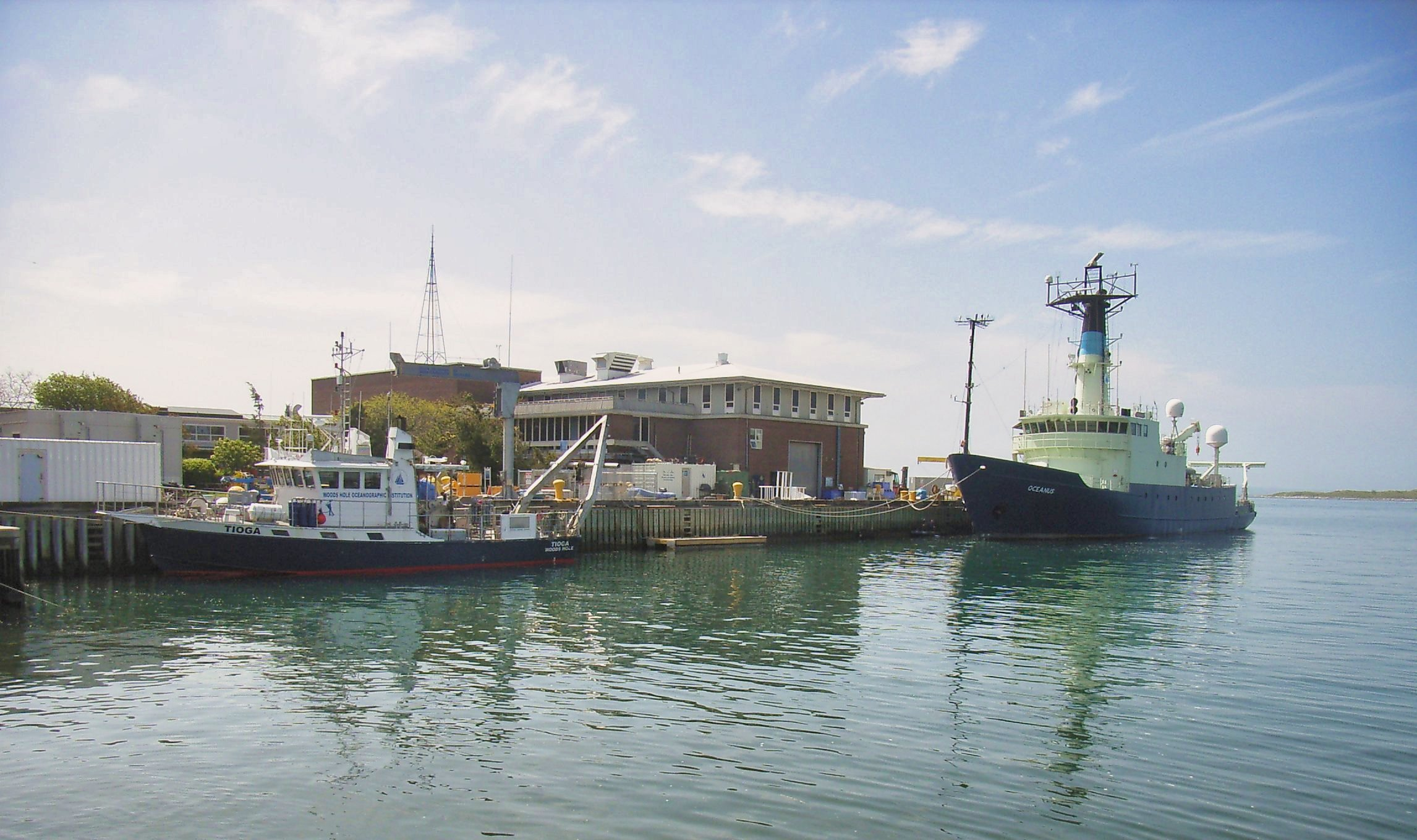
Tioga (at left) with RV Oceanus outside the Woods Hole Oceanographic Institution, May 2009

RV Tioga is a coastal research vessel operated by the Woods Hole Oceanographic Institution.

Tioga is a fast coastal vessel designed to quickly take advantage of weather windows and breaking events, such as the 2004 Harmful Algae Bloom (Red Tide) outbreak.

Currently Tioga is heavily involved in the tagging and studying of the endangered right whales and the maintenance of the Martha's Vineyard Coastal Observatory.

Tioga is capable of many missions such as education, autonomous vehicle operations, coring, water sampling, diving, whale tagging, mooring deployments and recoveries, instrument deployments and is a cost-effective way to test and troubleshoot equipment before longer cruises on larger vessels.

She is the third of the Challenger class research vessels. Her sisters include the 50 foot Gulf Challenger, operated by the University of New Hampshire, the 55 foot Fay Slover, operated by the Old Dominion University, and the 81 foot Rachel Carson operated by the University of Maryland.
