= Christopher D'Elia =

American marine scientist and biologist

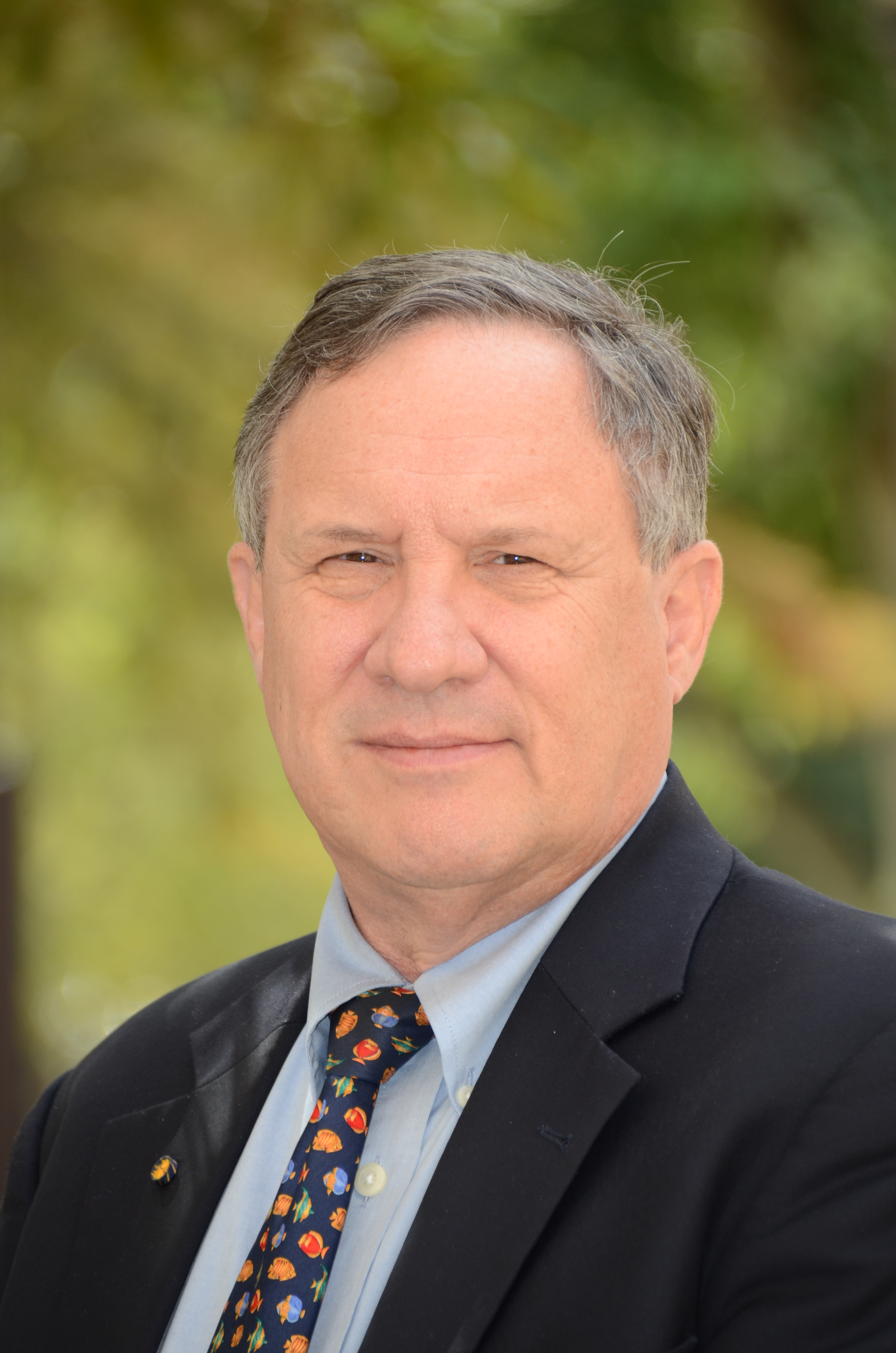
Portrait photograph from 2014

Christopher Francis D'Elia is an American marine scientist whose research concerns nutrient dynamics in estuaries and coral reefs, including nitrogen and phosphorus cycling and coastal nutrient pollution. He was dean of the College of the Coast and Environment at Louisiana State University (LSU) from 2009 to 2023 and retired from the university in 2026.

Earlier in his career he directed the Maryland Sea Grant College Program and the National Science Foundation's Biological Oceanography Program, and was vice president for research at the University at Albany, SUNY. As a graduate student he took part in the 1971 Symbios Expedition, an interdisciplinary study of coral-reef metabolism at Enewetak Atoll. He is an elected Fellow of the American Association for the Advancement of Science.

== Early life and education ==
D'Elia earned an A.B. in biology from Middlebury College in 1968 and a Ph.D. in zoology from the University of Georgia in 1974. He carried out postdoctoral work at the University of California, Los Angeles and, as a Noyes Postdoctoral Fellow, at the Woods Hole Oceanographic Institution, and was a visiting assistant professor at the University of Southern California in 1975.

While a graduate student at Georgia, D'Elia was a member of the scientific party of the Symbios Expedition, a two-month interdisciplinary study of ecosystem processes at Enewetak Atoll in the Marshall Islands carried out in 1971.

== Career ==
In 1977 D'Elia joined the Chesapeake Biological Laboratory of the University of Maryland Center for Environmental Science, where he held appointments as assistant, associate, and full professor and conducted research on the nutrient dynamics of coral reefs and of the Chesapeake Bay. He was the Ruth Patrick Distinguished Scholar at the Academy of Natural Sciences of Philadelphia in 1982–1983, and in the late 1980s was a program director for the Biological Oceanography Program at the National Science Foundation.

D'Elia directed the Maryland Sea Grant College Program from 1989 to 1999. He served twice as president of the Sea Grant Association and was president of the Estuarine Research Federation (now the Coastal and Estuarine Research Federation) from 1991 to 1993. During this period he also held leadership roles in national scientific organizations, including the Council of Scientific Society Presidents and the National Association of State Universities and Land-Grant Colleges.

In 1999 D'Elia was appointed vice president for research at the University at Albany, SUNY, and he subsequently held faculty and administrative positions at the University of South Florida St. Petersburg.

D'Elia joined LSU in 2009 as professor and dean of the College of the Coast and Environment. He served as dean until 2023 and continued to teach before retiring from the university in 2026, after 16 years at the institution. As dean during the Deepwater Horizon oil spill, he spoke to national media about the spill's environmental effects. He taught courses including marine biology and energy and the environment, and co-authored the textbook Energy & Environment: The Grand Challenges of the 21st Century (2022).

== Research ==
D'Elia's research addresses nutrient dynamics in aquatic systems, including nitrogen and phosphorus cycling in coral reefs and estuaries, algal–invertebrate symbiosis, and the eutrophication of the Chesapeake Bay. He has authored or co-authored numerous scientific papers, book chapters, and books on these subjects and on science policy and energy and the environment.

== Honors and recognition ==
D'Elia is an elected Fellow of the American Association for the Advancement of Science. In 2014 the University of Georgia Graduate School named him a recipient of its Alumni of Distinction Award.

== Service ==
D'Elia has served on advisory panels for federal and state science agencies and on a number of non-profit boards.
