= Autonomous Benthic Explorer =

Autonomous underwater vehicle, 1996–2010

Autonomous Benthic Explorer (ABE) was a pioneering autonomous underwater vehicle (AUV) owned and operated by Woods Hole Oceanographic Institution (WHOI) in Woods Hole, Massachusetts. ABE was designed to perform wide-area seabed surveys at depths of up to 4500 m (14,674 ft) and completed 222 missions from 1996 until it was lost at sea in 2010. ABE pioneered the use of a relatively simple AUV to perform wide area surveys, identify points of interest, and "scout" for a more sophisticated crewed vehicle or ROV.

== Design ==
After hydrothermal vents were discovered using DSV Alvin in 1977, there was significant scientific interest in returning to previously surveyed vent sites. Since DSV Alvin was highly sought after, WHOI developed several uncrewed platforms that could perform similar missions without the need for a human operator.

ABE consisted of three torpedo-shaped hulls arranged in a shape similar to the fictional Starship Enterprise. The upper two hulls each contained three glass spheres to provide buoyancy, while the lower platform contained the batteries, navigation equipment, and mission sensors. The vehicle could operated at depths of 4500 m (14,674 ft) for up to 20 hrs. Five independent thrusters allowed for three dimensional maneuverability at speeds up to 1.4 kts.

ABE used long baseline acoustic positioning system to navigate a pre-programmed route along the seafloor. Autonomous vehicles such as ABE quickly became popular for survey and mapping missions as they could remain near the seafloor for up to 5 times as long as crewed platforms such as DSV Alvin.

== History ==
ABE was developed by WHOI in 1994 and participated in its first mission during the summer of 1996 where it was used create sonar and magnetic maps of a subsea lava flow on the Juan de Fuca ridge in the Eastern Pacific. During this first missions, ABE retained an umbilical cable to the deploying research vessel, but navigated autonomously back and forth over the lava flow. From 1999 to 2006, ABE was used to conduct wide area mapping of regions with known hydrothermal vents (such as the Southeast Pacific Rise) and identified many additional vents. ABE's first truly autonomous mission did not occur until 2000, when researchers deployed ABE to survey one site, left for a different site 30 mi away, then returned to recover ABE when it had finished its survey. By 2004, ABE demonstrated a capability to autonomously detect and localize a hydrothermal vent using the chemical concentration of the vent's plume.

ABE was lost during its 222nd mission on March 5, 2010. at a depth of 3000m. At the time, the research vessel USNS Melville was using ABE to map and photograph a hydrothermal vent site near the Chile triple junction. The operators believe that one of the six glass spheres used to provide buoyancy catastrophically failed, leading to the sympathetic detonation of the remaining five spheres. ABE is not believed to be recoverable.

== Legacy ==
ABE demonstrated the capability of an AUV to perform long-duration mapping and sea floor survey missions and spawned a series of deep-diving AUV. It is now rare for oceanographic teams to deploy a crewed deep submergence vehicle without first using an AUV to survey the area and determine the best site to visit. WHOI developed a direct successor to ABE, the AUV Sentry, which saw extensive use in assessing the damage caused by the Deepwater Horizon disaster.

== See also ==
- Autonomous underwater vehicle
- Deep-submergence vehicle
- Hydrothermal vent

=== Modern vehicles with similar configuration ===
- Sentry
- REMUS 6000
- Autosub Long Range
