= Sybil P. Seitzinger =

Oceanographer and climate scientist

Sybil Putnam Seitzinger
- Scientific career
- Thesis: The importance of denitrification and nitrous oxide production in the nitrogen dynamics and ecology of Narragansett Bay, Rhode Island (1982)
- Doctoral advisor: Scott Nixon

Sybil P. Seitzinger is an oceanographer and climate scientist at the Pacific Institute for Climate Solutions. She is known for her research into climate change and elemental cycling, especially nitrogen biogeochemistry.

== Education and career ==
Seitzinger has a B.S. in biology from the Boston University (1974) and earned a PhD in biological oceanography from the University of Rhode Island in 1982 under the advising of Scott Nixon. She also has an honorary PhD from Utrecht University. She has previously served as director of the Rutgers/NOAA Cooperative Marine Education and Research Program, and was a visiting professor at Rutgers University. From 2006 to 2008, Seitzinger was president of the Association for the Sciences of Limnology and Oceanography. Following this, Seitzinger was the director of the International Geosphere-Biosphere Program at the Royal Swedish Academy of Sciences from 2008 to 2015. Seitzinger is currently the executive directory at the Pacific Institute for Climate Solutions and a professor of Environmental Studies at the University of Victoria.

== Awards and honors ==
- NOAA Administrators Silver Medal (1999)
- NOAA Administrators Gold Medal (2005)
- Member, American Academy of Arts and Sciences (2011)
- Honorary PhD from Utrecht University in the Netherlands (2016)
- Sverdrup lecture, American Geophysical Union (2018)
- Fellow, American Geophysical Union (2019)
- Recipient of the A.C. Redfield Lifetime Achievement Award from the Association for the Sciences of Limnology and Oceanography (2020)

== Selected publications ==
- Frank Biermann, Xuemei Bai, Ninad Bondre, Wendy Broadgate, Chen-Tung Arthur Chen, Opha Pauline Dube, Jan Willem Erisman, Marion Glaser, Sandra van der Hel, Maria Carmen Lemos, Seitzinger, Karen C. Seton (2016). Down to earth: Contextualizing the Anthropocene. Global Environmental Change, 39, 341–350. doi:10.1016/j.gloenvcha.2015.11.004
- Galloway, J. N.; Townsend, A. R.; Erisman, J. W.; Bekunda, M.; Cai, Z.; Freney, J. R.; Martinelli, L. A.; Seitzinger, S. P.; Sutton, M. A. (2008-05-16). "Transformation of the Nitrogen Cycle: Recent Trends, Questions, and Potential Solutions". Science. 320 (5878): 889–892. Bibcode:2008Sci...320..889G. doi:10.1126/science.1136674. ISSN 0036-8075. PMID 18487183. S2CID 16547816.
- Seitzinger, Sybil P. (1988). "Denitrification in freshwater and coastal marine ecosystems: Ecological and geochemical significance". Limnology and Oceanography. 33 (4part2): 702–724. Bibcode:1988LimOc..33..702S. doi:10.4319/lo.1988.33.4part2.0702. ISSN 1939-5590.
- Seitzinger, Sybil P.; Phillips, Leigh (2017-07-28). "Nitrogen stewardship in the Anthropocene". Science. 357 (6349): 350–351. Bibcode:2017Sci...357..350S. doi:10.1126/science.aao0812. ISSN 0036-8075. PMID 28751593. S2CID 39405842.
