= Candace Oviatt =

American ecologist

Candace Ann Oviatt is an ecologist at the University of Rhode Island, known for her research into coastal marine ecosystems, with a particular focus on Narragansett Bay, Rhode Island.

== Education and career ==
Oviatt obtained a B.S. in biology from Bates College in 1961. In 1967, she became the first woman to get a Ph.D. from the Graduate School of Oceanography at the University of Rhode Island. Oviatt's Ph.D. dissertation examined how light impacted the movement of starfish which was published in the journal Behavior in 1969.

After graduate school, Oviatt took a research position at the Harvard School of Public Health. Following that period, she was a research associate at the University of Rhode Island where she ultimately became a professor and the director of the University of Rhode Island's Marine Ecosystems Research Lab. In 1969, Oviatt began a long-standing research partnership with Scott W. Nixon which began when they simultaneously established labs in the Fish Building on the Graduate School of Oceanography campus. In 2016, the University of Rhode Island honored Oviatt by inducting her into its Lifetime Service Society.

Oviatt served as president of Estuarine Research Foundation, now the Coastal and Estuarine Research Federation, from 1995 to 1997. As of 2020, Oviatt is on the Rhode Island Natural History Survey's board of advisors.

== Research ==
While at Harvard, Oviatt examined the potential impact of disposing burned municipal waste at sea by focusing on its impact on clams, fish, and flounder eggs.

Once she returned to Rhode Island, she worked with Scott Nixon on a large scale assessment of the productivity of a New England salt marsh in a paper which combined measured data and modeled impacts of changes in temperature and sewage additions. Following this work, Oviatt began a series of research projects within Narragansett Bay including investigations into sediment loading and historical fish and shellfish information. By comparing historical data and new research, Oviatt's research has shown that nutrient levels have decreased within Narragansett Bay with a concurrent increase in the clarity of the water.

A turning point in public interest in Narragansett Bay came in 2003 when a large number of fish died due to hypoxia, an event that encouraged the public to take an interest in the region's water quality. Following the fish kill event, the Rhode Island Department of Environmental Management set a goal to reduce nitrogen inputs into Narragansett Bay by 50% when comparing levels from 1995-1996 to 2013-2014, a goal that was met by 2015. Oviatt's research has tracked long term changes in the water quality of the Bay after the establishment of new regulations regarding discharge from sewage plant. During a 2017 symposium in which the question became whether the nutrient levels were too low, Oviatt noted that Narragansett Bay is always changing but "it's not a dead bay" because there are increases in some fish species concurrent with the decreases in crustaceans.

Oviatt also played a critical role in establishing the Marine Ecosystem Research Lab (MERL) at the University of Rhode Island in 1976 with Scott Nixon and Michael Pilson. This laboratory enabled them to conduct large scale experiments with enclosed tanks (mesocosms), thereby reproducing conditions within Narragansett Bay in a controlled manner. Using the MERL tanks, Oviatt examined the impact of adding high concentrations of nutrients to a closed system and the reverse situation with nutrients present in limiting quantities. Other experiments included quantifying the bounds of primary production in Narragansett Bay and the fate of sewage added to the coastal environment.

More recently, Oviatt has used historical data to project what may happen to biological communities under future climate scenarios and how hurricanes alter the flux of nutrients into a region and thereby cause increased amounts of the seaweed Sargassum in the Virgin Islands.

In 2015, Oviatt received the B.H. Ketchum Award from Woods Hole Oceanographic Institution and was recognized for:

... her excellence in coastal marine ecology, especially her work on Narragansett Bay as a model system for the study of human impacts on temperate estuaries. In an era where eutrophication has become one of the most pressing environmental issues our society faces, her early work was ahead of its time

— Matt Charette, director of the Coastal Ocean Institute at Woods Hole Oceanographic Institution

Ph.D. Biological Oceanography, University of Rhode Island

== Awards ==
- Bostwick H. Ketchum Award from Woods Hole Oceanographic Institution (2015)
- Lifetime Achievement Award, Save the Bay (2016)
- University of Rhode Island Lifetime Service (2016)
