= Sentry (AUV) =

Autonomous underwater vehicle

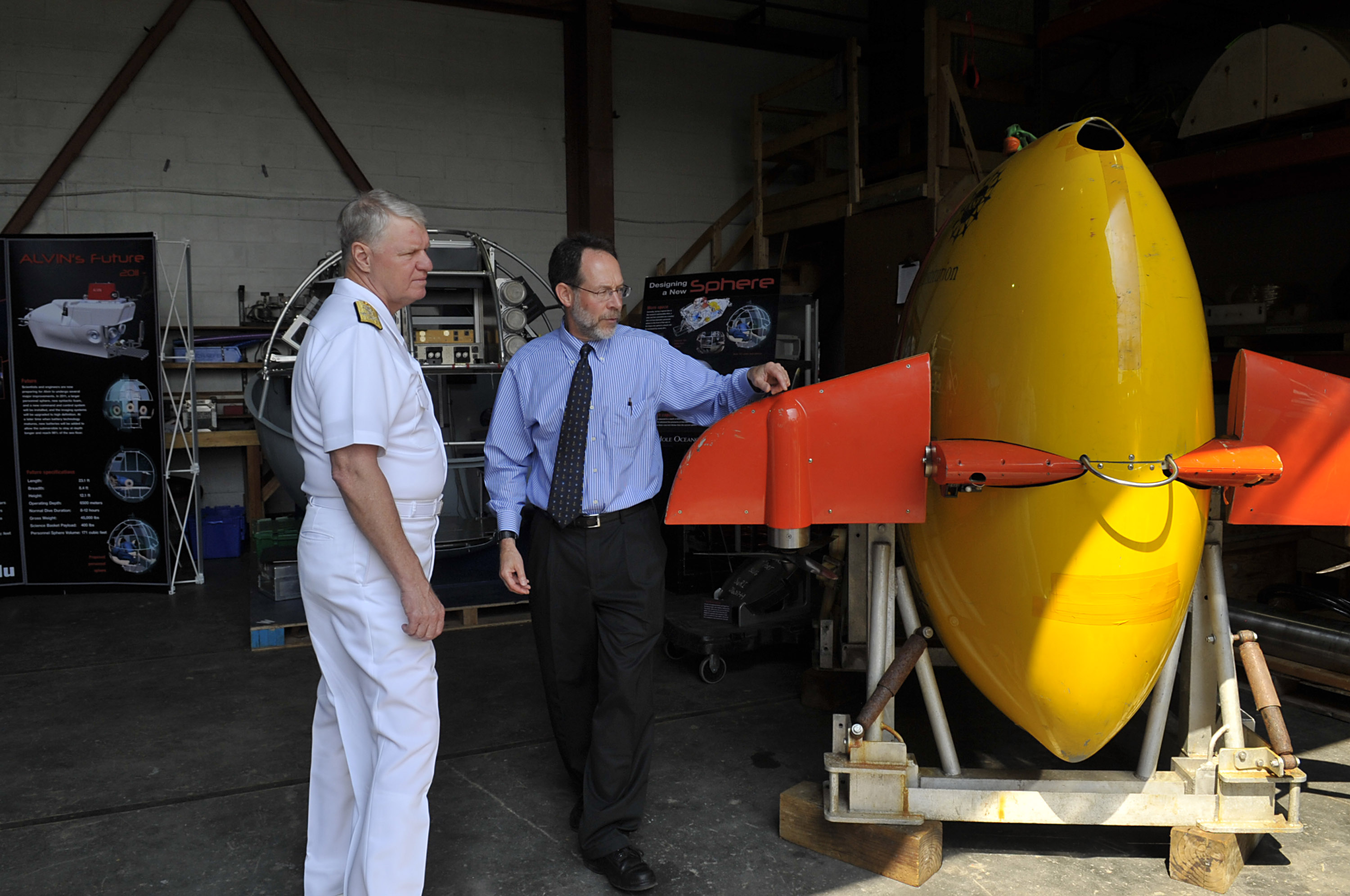
AUV Sentry is shown to ADM Gary Roughead in 2011

The Sentry is an autonomous underwater vehicle (AUV) made by the Woods Hole Oceanographic Institution. Sentry is designed to descend to depths of 6,000 metres (20,000 ft) and to carry a range of devices for taking samples, pictures and readings from the deep sea.

Sentry is the successor to ''ABE'' (Autonomous Benthic Explorer) and is designed for research at the mid-water and near-seabed depths. The AUV was first trialled in deep-sea operations off Bermuda in April 2006.

Sentry is 6 feet (1.8 m) feet in height, 7.2 feet (2.2 m) wide (including thrusters) and 9.5 feet (2.9 m) long.

== Operation ==
The Sentry is carried to its work location in a container containing all the systems necessary for operation. Communications can be established from land-based or ship-based locations for control and data reception.

== Systems ==
=== Navigation ===
Sentry navigates by means of a doppler velocity log combined with an inertial navigation system. These are used in conjunction with a USBL, or LBL, acoustic navigation system which is also used to communicate with the vessel—providing it with commands as well as receiving the data from the sensors and onboard equipment.

Sentry is powered by four thrusters attached to four "tilting planes", similar to small wings, attached in pairs at the front and rear of the vehicle. Sentry has two modes of operation, hover mode and forward flight mode. In hover mode the control surfaces are moved into a vertical position, and in forward mode the surfaces can be moved to +45 and -45 degrees from horizontal. Sentry uses these to give a 6-DoF (degrees of freedom) capability to its sensors for measurement.

Sentry tracks its direction and attitude with a TCM2 PNI sensor and a Systron Donner Inertial yaw rate sensor. The Doppler sonar, a 300 kHz RD Instruments bottom-lock unit, measures the heading in 3D as well as altitude above the sea floor while a Paroscientific depth sensor monitors depth below the sea surface. These systems allow for an accuracy of 1/2 a degree in heading and to maintain depth to an accuracy of 2 centimetres (0.79 in).

Propulsion and control are managed by an onboard "Jason 2" system which was developed by the Woods Hole Oceanographic Institution and the Johns Hopkins University and proven over several hundred deep-water tests. The AUV is powered by 1,000 lithium-ion batteries designed and specially adapted for the great pressure at the depths that Sentry can descend to. It is estimated that Sentry will have a range of 100 km at 2.5 knots and 150 km at 1.5 knots.

=== Sensors, measurement and sampling ===
The equipment that can be carried by Sentry is extensive in range. The vessel carries standard sensors, such as CTD (conductivity, temperature and depth) and digital cameras, as well as being able to carry equipment for bathymetric and magnetic mapping, the TETHYS (Tethered Yearlong Spectrometer) in-situ mass spectrometer and the Nakamura redox potential probe.

== Missions ==
=== Underwater observatory ===
Sentry was used to map possible sites for an undersea observatory along the US coast. John Delaney of the University of Washington said "Sentry has given us a survey with great precision and resolution. These maps will help with the installation of the primary nodes of a networked observatory on the Juan de Fuca tectonic plate".

The survey was carried out in the Strait of Juan de Fuca running between north-west Washington State and Vancouver Island, British Columbia, Canada, which links Puget Sound and the Strait of Georgia with the Pacific Ocean.

=== Deepwater Horizon oil spill survey ===
Recently Sentry was used to help take 5,800 mass spectrometer readings in the sea at the site of the Deepwater Horizon explosion and subsequentoil spill in the Gulf of Mexico. It was sent 19 times into the under-water oil plume to provide data, using the TETHYS and CTD sensors, giving information on the chemical make-up and the positions of the plume. Detection was made as low as 50 micrograms per litre.
