= Woods Hole Oceanographic Institution =

Private, nonprofit research and education facility

Coordinates: 41°31′28.26″N 70°40′15.50″W

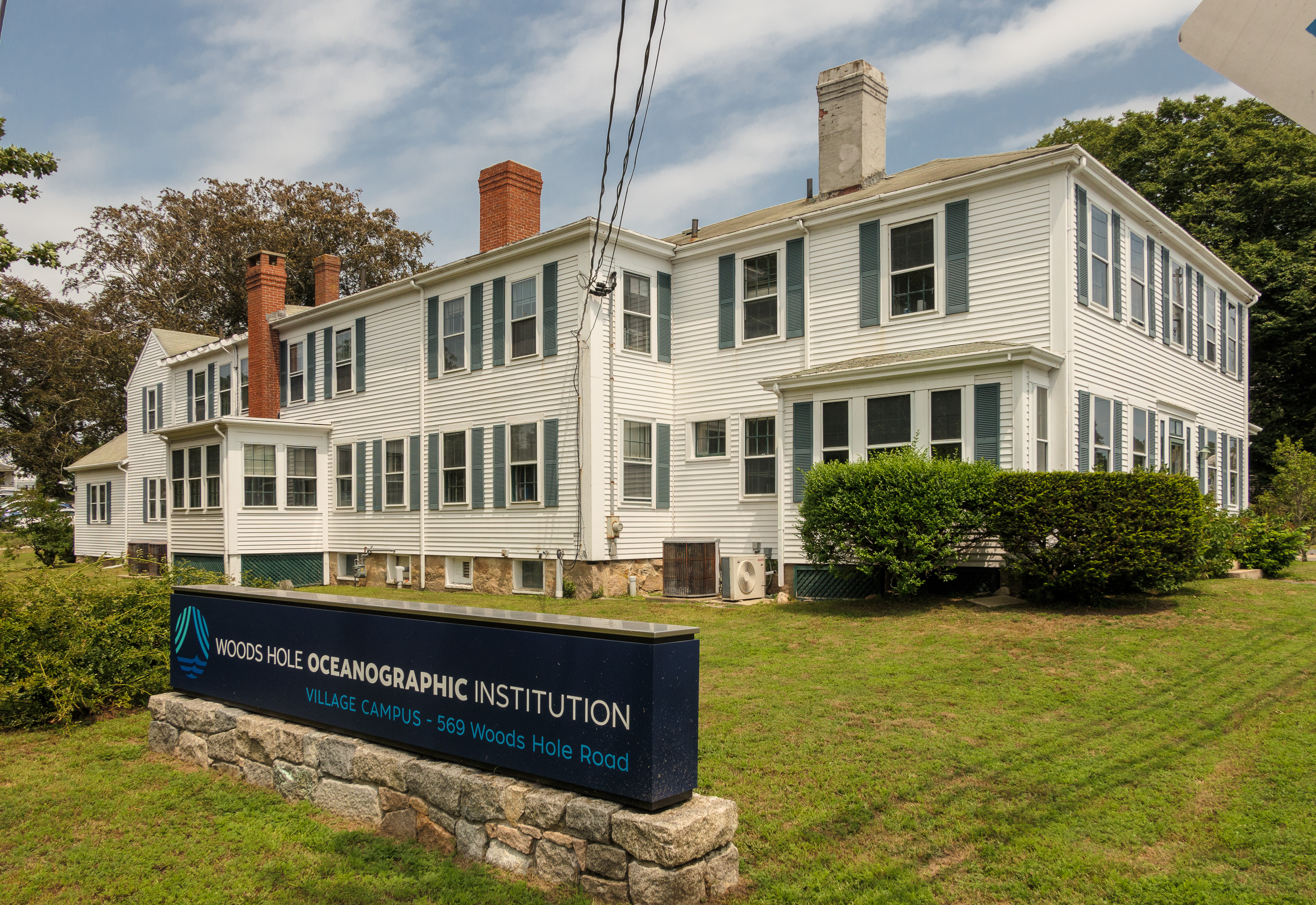
- Village campus
- Established: 1930; 96 years ago
- Research type: Marine sciences and marine engineering
- President: Peter B. de Menocal
- Staff: 1,000 (approximate)
- Location: Woods Hole, Massachusetts
- Website: WHOI.edu

The Woods Hole Oceanographic Institution (WHOI, acronym pronounced /ˈhuːi/ HOO-ee) is a private, nonprofit research and higher education facility dedicated to the study of marine science and engineering.

Established in 1930 in Woods Hole, Massachusetts, it is the largest independent oceanographic research institution in the U.S., with staff and students numbering about 1,000.

== Constitution ==
The institution is organized into six departments, the Cooperative Institute for Climate and Ocean Research, and a marine policy center. Its shore-based facilities are located in the village of Woods Hole, within the town of Falmouth, Massachusetts, United States and a mile and a half away on the Quissett Campus. The bulk of the institution's funding comes from grants and contracts from the National Science Foundation and other government agencies, augmented by foundations and private donations.

WHOI scientists, engineers, and students collaborate to develop theories, test ideas, build seagoing instruments, and collect data in diverse marine environments. Ships operated by WHOI carry research scientists throughout the world's oceans. The WHOI fleet includes two large research vessels (Atlantis and Neil Armstrong), the coastal craft Tioga, small research craft such as the dive-operation work boat Echo, the deep-diving human-occupied submersible Alvin, the tethered, remotely operated vehicle Jason/Medea, and autonomous underwater vehicles such as the REMUS and SeaBED.

WHOI offers graduate and post-doctoral studies in marine science. There are several fellowship and training programs, and graduate degrees are awarded through a joint program with the Massachusetts Institute of Technology (MIT). WHOI is accredited by the New England Association of Schools and Colleges. WHOI also offers public outreach programs and informal education through its Exhibit Center and summer tours. The institution has a volunteer program and a membership program, WHOI Associate.

WHOI shares a library, the MBLWHOI Library, with the Marine Biological Laboratory. The MBLWHOI Library holds print and electronic collections in the biological, biomedical, ecological, and oceanographic sciences. The library also conducts digitization, data preservation and informatics projects.

On October 1, 2020, Peter B. de Menocal became the institution's eleventh president and director.

== History ==
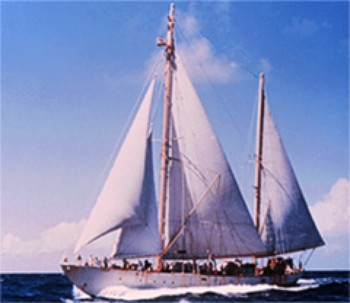
R/V Atlantis, the first research vessel operated by the Woods Hole Oceanographic Institution, pictured here in 1955 near the Virgin Islands

In 1927, a National Academy of Sciences committee concluded that it was time to "consider the share of the United States of America in a worldwide program of oceanographic research." The committee's recommendation for establishing a permanent independent research laboratory on the East Coast to "prosecute oceanography in all its branches" led to the founding in 1930 of the Woods Hole Oceanographic Institution.

A $2.5 million grant from the Rockefeller Foundation supported the summer work of a dozen scientists, construction of a laboratory building and commissioning of a research vessel, the 142-foot (43 m) ketch Atlantis, whose profile still forms the institution's logo.

WHOI grew substantially to support significant defense-related research during World War II, and later began a steady growth in staff, research fleet, and scientific stature. From 1950 to 1956, the director was Dr. Edward "Iceberg" Smith, an Arctic explorer, oceanographer and retired Coast Guard rear admiral.

In 1977 the institution appointed oceanographer John Steele as director, and he served until his retirement in 1989.

On 1 September 1985, a joint French-American expedition led by Jean-Louis Michel of IFREMER and Robert Ballard of the Woods Hole Oceanographic Institution identified the location of the wreck of RMS Titanic, which sank off the coast of Newfoundland 15 April 1912.

On 3 December 2007, Nathaniel Abraham, a Christian scientist who studied zebrafish, sued WHOI in the Federal District of Massachusetts for employment discrimination, alleging that he was fired in 2004 for rejecting evolution. It was dismissed on 3 April 2008 due to statute of limitations having passed for a 2006 complaint to the Massachusetts Commission Against Discrimination, but according to Eugenie C. Scott of the National Center for Science Education, he would likely have lost in court because "it is inconceivable that someone working in developmental biology at a major research institution would not be expected to deal intimately with evolution."

On 3 April 2011, within a week of resuming of the search operation for Air France Flight 447, a team led by WHOI, operating full ocean depth autonomous underwater vehicles (AUVs) owned by the Waitt Institute discovered, by means of sidescan sonar, a large portion of debris field from flight AF447.

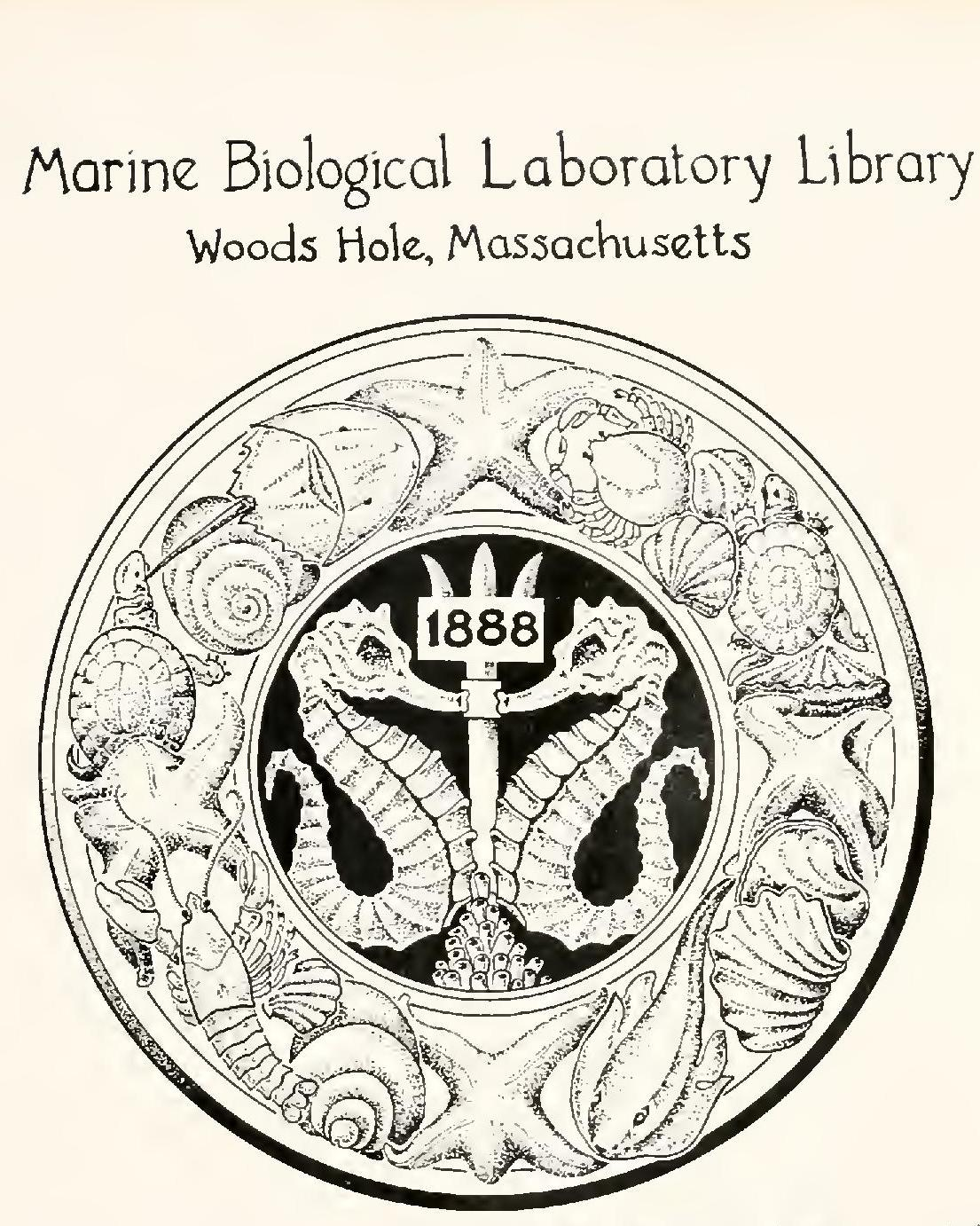
Marine Biological Laboratory Library bookplate, 1914

In March 2017 the institution effected an open-access policy to make its research publicly accessible online.

In 2019, iDefense reported that China's hackers had launched cyberattacks on dozens of academic institutions in an attempt to gain information on technology being developed for the United States Navy. Some of the targets included the Woods Hole Oceanographic Institution. The attacks had been underway since at least April 2017.

In August 2024, institution researchers are scheduled, pending approval from the U.S. Environmental Protection Agency, to conduct a $10 million ocean alkalinity enhancement experiment partially funded by the National Oceanic and Atmospheric Administration that will release 6,000 gallons of a liquid solution of sodium hydroxide into the ocean 10 miles south of Martha's Vineyard in an attempt to remove 20 metric tons of carbon dioxide from the atmosphere.

== Military contracting ==
The Woods Hole Oceanographic Institution develops technology for the United States Navy, including ocean battlespace sensors, unmanned undersea vehicles, and acoustic navigation and communication systems for operations in the Arctic. The institution is also working on Project Sundance for the Office of Naval Research.

== Awards issued ==
=== B. H. Ketchum Award ===
The B. H. Ketchum award, established in 1983, is presented for innovative coastal/nearshore research and is named in honor of oceanographer Bostwick H. "Buck" Ketchum. The award is administered by the WHOI Coastal Ocean Institute and Rinehart Coastal Research Center.

Recipients:

- 2017: Don Anderson, Woods Hole Oceanographic Institution
- 2015: Candace Oviatt, Graduate School of Oceanography, University of Rhode Island
- 2010: James E. Cloern, United States Geological Survey
- 2007: Richard Garvine, University of Delaware
- 2003: John Farrington, Woods Hole Oceanographic Institution
- 2003: Nancy Rabalais, Louisiana Universities Marine Consortium
- 1999: Willard Moore, University of South Carolina
- 1996: Ronald Smith, Loughbororugh University
- 1995: Christopher Martens, University of North Carolina
- 1992: Scott Nixon, University of Rhode Island
- 1990: Daniel Lynch, Dartmouth College
- 1989: William Boicourt, University of Maryland
- 1988: Alasdair McIntyre, Aberdeen University (Emeritus)
- 1986: John S. Allen, Oregon State University
- 1985: Thomas H. Pearson, Oban, Argyll, Scotland
- 1985: Michael Moore, Plymouth, United Kingdom
- 1984: Edward D. Goldberg, Scripps Institution of Oceanography

=== Henry Bryant Bigelow Medal in Oceanography ===
The Henry Bryant Bigelow Medal in Oceanography was established in 1960 in honor of the first WHOI Director, biologist Henry Bryant Bigelow.

Recipients: Source:

- 2004 David M. Karl (Professor of Oceanography, University of Hawaiʻi) – for "his contributions to microbial oceanography, especially the development and leadership of long-term, integrated studies of chemical, physical, and biological variations in oceanic environments."
- 1996 Bill J. Jenkins (Senior Scientist, Marine Chemistry & Geochemistry, WHOI) – for "his outstanding contributions to the development of the tritium-helium dating technique and its application to problems in ocean physics and biology and geochemistry, as well as his exceptional character and selfless dedication to the advance of science at WHOI."
- 1993 Robert Weller (Senior Scientist, Physical Oceanography; Director, CICOR; WHOI)
- 1992 Alice Louise Alldredge (University of California, Santa Barbara) and Mary Wilcox Silver (University of California, Santa Cruz) – for "their creative contributions to biological and chemical oceanography, particularly in demonstrating the importance of 'marine snow' as a major contributor to the vertical flux of particulate matter throughout the worlds oceans."
- 1988 Hans Thomas Rossby (University of Rhode Island) and Douglas Chester Webb (Webb Research) – for "Their creative contributions to ocean technology and oceanography, particularly in the development of the SOFAR float and advancing out knowledge of Lagrangian ocean dynamics."
- 1984 Arnold L. Gordon (Columbia University) for his "dedication in completing the Antarctic Circumpolar Survey"
- 1980 Holger W. Jannasch (WHOI) – for his "creative contributions to marine microbiology by providing us with an understanding of the fundamentals of microbial processes in the sea and the dynamics of oceanic food chains."
- 1979 Wolfgang Helmut Berger (Scripps Institution of Oceanography, University of California at San Diego) – for his "creative contributions to paleoceanography by opening the doors of perception on the controlling factors governing carbonate sedimentation in the oceans, and for providing us with a unifying conceptual model for interpreting the geological evolution of ocean basins."
- 1974 Henry M. Stommel (WHOI)
- 1970 Frederick J. Vine (WHOI) – In recognition of his "imaginative and sound contributions to man's understanding of the formative processes active within the earth."
- 1966 Columbus O'D. Iselin (WHOI)
- 1964 Bruce C. Heezen (WHOI)
- 1962 John C. Swallow (WHOI)
- 1960 Henry Bryant Bigelow

== Scientists ==
Over the years, WHOI scientists have made seminal discoveries about the ocean that have contributed to improving US commerce, health, national security, and quality of life. They have received awards and recognition from scientific societies such as The Oceanography Society, the American Geophysical Union, Association for the Sciences of Limnology and Oceanography, and several others.

Notable scientists include:

- Amy Bower, senior scientist, blind oceanographer
- Stan Hart, scientist emeritus, William Bowie Medal recipient
- Elizabeth Kujawinski, American oceanographer, Woods Hole Senior Scientist
- Loral O'Hara, research engineer, NASA astronaut
- Christopher Reddy, senior scientist, oil spill researcher
- Alfred C. Redfield (1890 – 1983), oceanographer. Discovered the Redfield ratio and served as WHOI senior biologist from 1930 to 1942, and associate director between 1942 and 1957. The Institute's Redfield Laboratory was named in his honor in 1971.
- Mary Sears, senior scientist in marine biology who served at the Naval Hydrographic Office in World War II compiling oceanographic intelligence for the Pacific Campaign
- Heidi Sosik, senior scientist in Biology, inventor
- Klaus Hasselmann, Doherty Professor at Woods Hole Oceanographic Institution from 1970 to 1972
- Robert Ballard, oceanographer, retired US Navy officer, explorer and maritime archeologist who found the wreck of the Titanic
- Lisan Yu – known for serving on the Earth Science Advisory Committee (ESAC), and on the Federal Advisory Committee Act (FACA) committee of NASA.

== Research fleet ==
=== Ships ===
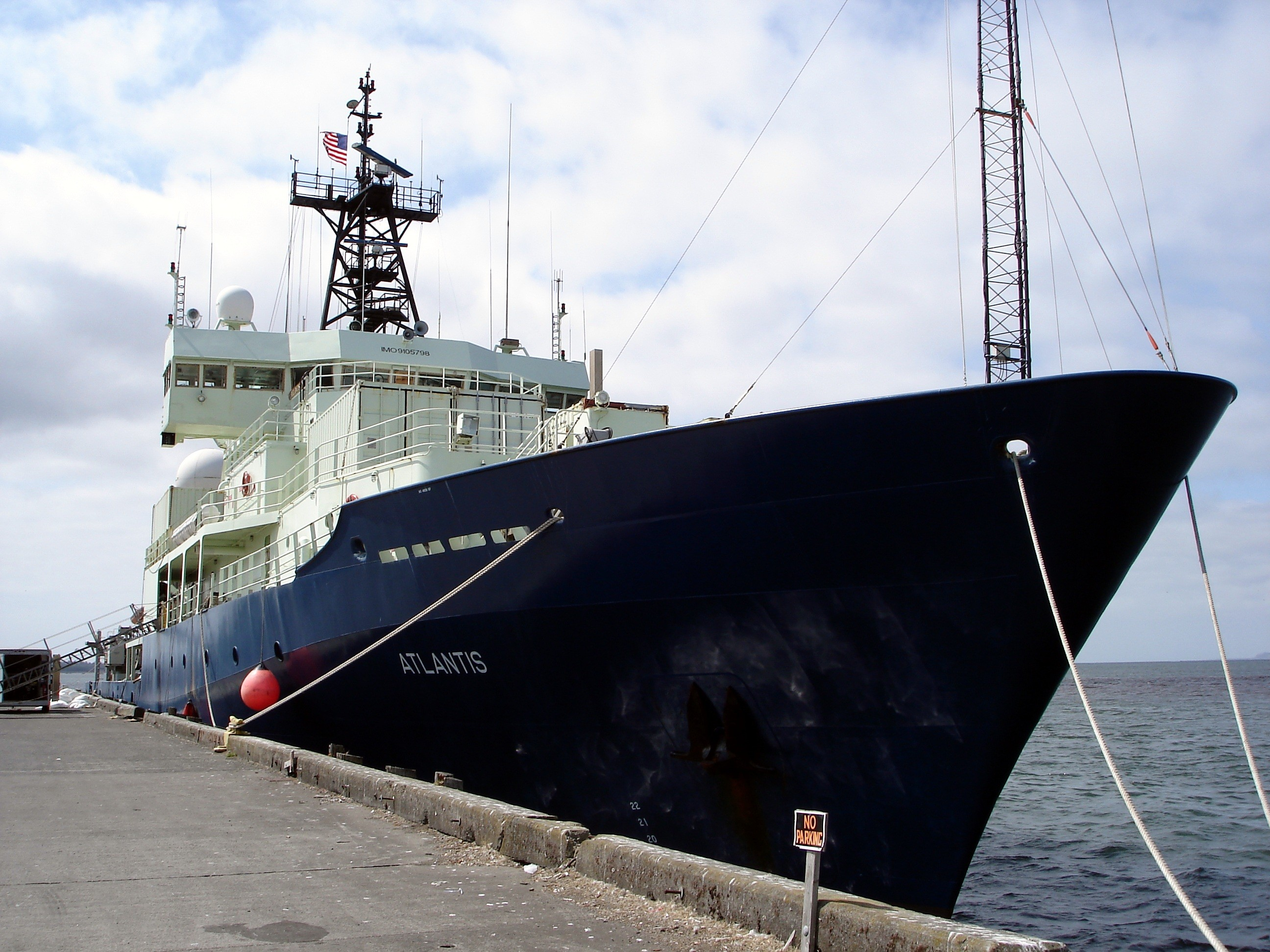
R/V Atlantis (AGOR-25)

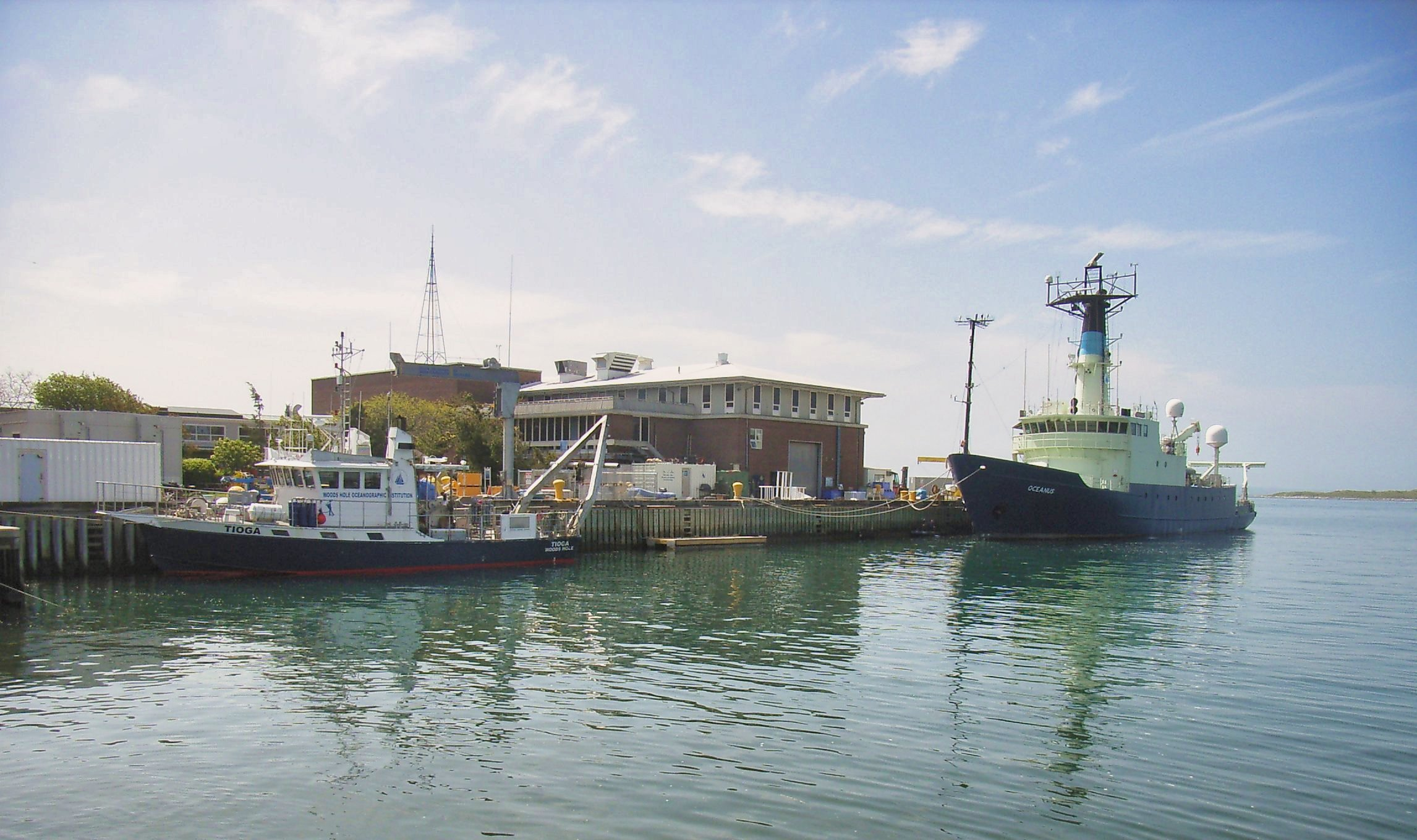
Research vessels Tioga and Oceanus at the WHOI wharf, May 2009

WHOI operates several research vessels, owned by the United States Navy, the National Science Foundation, or the institution:

- R/V Atlantis (AGOR-25) – 274 feet long, mothership of the Alvin submarine
- R/V Tioga (WHOI-owned) – 60 feet long
- R/V Neil Armstrong (AGOR-27) – 238 feet long

WHOI formerly operated R/V Knorr, which was replaced by R/V Neil Armstrong in 2015, and also the R/V Oceanus, which was transferred elsewhere in 2011.

=== Small boat fleet ===
WHOI operates many small boats used in inland harbors, ponds, rivers, and coastal bays. All are owned by the institution itself.

- Motorboat Echo – 29 feet long (mainly used as a work boat to support dive operations, also the newest small research craft at WHOI)
- Motorboat Mytilus – 24 feet long (mainly used in water too shallow for larger craft and is a versatile coastal research boat)
- Motorboat Calanus – 21 feet long (mainly used in local water bodies such as Great Harbor, Vineyard Sound and Buzzards Bay)
- Motorboat Limulus – 13 feet long (mainly used to shuttle equipment to larger craft and as a work platform for near-shore research tasks)
- Rowboat Orzrus – 12 feet long (mainly used in harbors and ponds where motor craft are not permitted)

=== Underwater vehicles ===
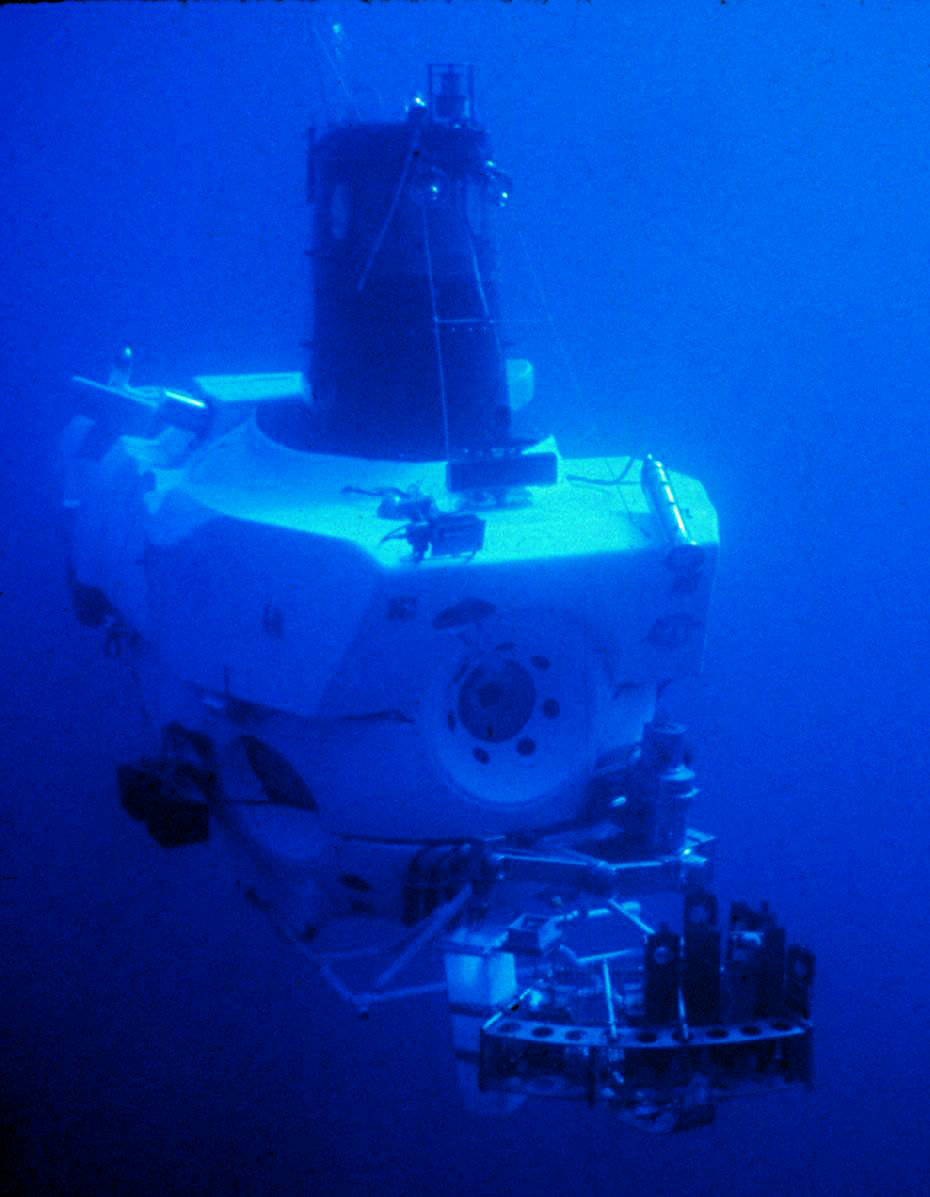
Alvin (DSV-2) in 1978

WHOI also has developed numerous underwater autonomous and remotely operated vehicles for research:

- Alvin (DSV-2) – human-occupied vehicle, the institution's most well-known equipment
- Deepsea Challenger – human-occupied vehicle designed, field-tested, and later donated to the WHOI by Canadian film director James Cameron
- Jason – a remotely operated vehicle (ROV)
- Sentry – an autonomous underwater vehicle (AUV) and successor to ABE
- Nereus – A hybrid remotely operated vehicle (HROV); lost on 5/10/14 while exploring the Kermadec Trench.
- Remus – Remote Environment Monitoring UnitS, a family of autonomous underwater vehicles
- Mesobot - an autonomous underwater vehicle built to track sea life in the mesopelagic zone
- SeaBED – an autonomous underwater vehicle optimized for high-resolution seafloor imaging
- Spray Glider – a remotely operated vehicle, used to collect data about the salinity, temperature, etc. about an area
- Slocum Glider – another remotely operated vehicle, with functions similar to the functions of the Spray Glider
- CAMPER – a towed vehicle used to collect samples from the seabed of the Arctic Ocean
- Seasoar – a submarine towed by a ship
- TowCam – a submarine with cameras that is towed by a ship along the ocean floor to take photographs
- Video Plankton Recorder – a submarine with microscopic camera systems, towed along by a ship to take videos of plankton
- Autonomous Benthic Explorer (ABE) – an autonomous underwater vehicle

== See also ==
- 52-hertz whale
- Liquid Jungle Lab, a tropical research station in Pacific Panama operated by WHOI
- Marine Biological Laboratory, a neighboring but administratively unrelated institution in Woods Hole
- The Institute of Marine and Coastal Sciences, a smaller oceanographic facility located at Rutgers University in New Jersey
- Harbor Branch Oceanographic Institute, a similar research facility associated with Florida Atlantic University and located in Fort Pierce, Florida
- Hatfield Marine Science Center, a similar research facility associated with the Oregon State University and located in Newport, Oregon
- Hopkins Marine Station, a similar research facility run by Stanford University in Monterey, California
- Moss Landing Marine Laboratories, a multi-campus marine research consortium of the California State University System
- Scripps Institution of Oceanography, a similar research facility associated with the University of California, San Diego and located in La Jolla, California
- Ocean Frontier Institute, an ocean research centre located in Halifax, Canada
