= Christina Tague =

American hydrologist

- Education: University of Toronto
- Scientific career
- Thesis: Modeling seasonal hydrologic response to forest harvesting and road construction : the role of drainage organization (2000)

Christina (Naomi) Tague is professor at the University of California, Santa Barbara who is known for her work on the intersection of land use and climate. She was elected a fellow of the American Geophysical Union in 2024.

== Education and career ==
Tague has a B.Eng. (1989) from the University of Waterloo. She earned an M.S.(1994) and a Ph.D.(1999) from the University of Toronto. After postdoctoral work at University Corporation for Atmospheric Research, she moved to the San Diego State University in 2000 as an assistant professor and was promoted to associate professor in 2005. In 2006 she moved to the University of California, Santa Barbara where she was promoted to professorin 2016.

== Research ==
Tague is known for her work on land use and climate. Her early research examined the interactions between road building and the regional flow of water and stream flow in Oregon rivers. Subsequent research examined the impact of fire on stream flow, the impact of climate on the accumulation of snow, and shifting regional water supplies.

== Awards and honors ==
Tague was elected a fellow of the American Geophysical Union in 2024.

== Selected publications ==
- Tague, C. L.; Band, L. E. (2004). "RHESSys: Regional Hydro-Ecologic Simulation System—An Object-Oriented Approach to Spatially Distributed Modeling of Carbon, Water, and Nutrient Cycling". Earth Interactions. 8 (19): 1–42. doi:10.1175/1087-3562(2004)8<1:RRHSSO>2.0.CO;2. ISSN 1087-3562.
- Tague, Christina; Grant, Gordon E. (2004). "A geological framework for interpreting the low‐flow regimes of Cascade streams, Willamette River Basin, Oregon". Water Resources Research. 40 (4). doi:10.1029/2003WR002629. ISSN 0043-1397.
- Walko, Robert L.; Band, Larry E.; Baron, Jill; Kittel, Timothy G. F.; Lammers, Richard; Lee, Tsengdar J.; Ojima, Dennis; Pielke, Roger A.; Taylor, Chris; Tague, Christina; Tremback, Craig J.; Vidale, Pier Luigi (2000). "Coupled Atmosphere–Biophysics–Hydrology Models for Environmental Modeling". Journal of Applied Meteorology. 39 (6): 931–944. doi:10.1175/1520-0450(2000)039<0931:CABHMF>2.0.CO;2. ISSN 0894-8763.
- Tague, Christina L.; Papuga, Shirley A.; Gerlein‐Safdi, Cynthia; Dymond, Salli; Morrison, Ryan R.; Boyer, Elizabeth W.; Riveros‐Iregui, Diego; Agee, Elizabeth; Arora, Bhavna; Dialynas, Yannis G.; Hansen, Amy; Krause, Stefan; Kuppel, Sylvain; Loheide, Steven P; Schymanski, Stanislaus J.; Zipper, Samuel C (2020-03-30). "Adding our leaves: A community‐wide perspective on research directions in ecohydrology". Hydrological Processes. 34 (7): 1665–1673. doi:10.1002/hyp.13693. hdl:2027.42/154539. ISSN 0885-6087.
