= Liquid Jungle Lab =

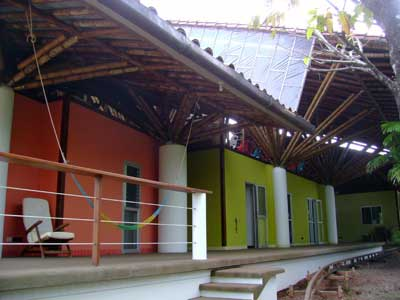
LJL Central Laboratory Facility

The Liquid Jungle Lab (LJL) is a tropical marine research station on the island of Canales de Tierra on the western coast of Pacific Panama along a primary marine biological corridor. The LJL research campus was completed in 2004 and is part of a private 3,500 hectare reserve composed of primary forest, mangroves, tide pools, and a rocky inter-tidal zone that transitions into fringing coral reefs.

The island laboratory is adjacent to two large coastal bays, Bahia Honda, Veraguas Province and Pixvae Bay, which are important mangrove, estuarine and riparian (stream) habitats. The island and laboratory serve as a strategic base for ecologic research of the Coiba National Park, a UNESCO World Heritage Site and Panama's largest marine protected area. The tremendous biodiversity of the marine and terrestrial environments surrounding Isla Canales de Tierra allows visiting scientists to conduct multidisciplinary ecologic research in a pristine area and has even inspired a designer perfume fragrance, Fleur de Liane. The LJL was founded by Jean Pigozzi, a Swiss venture capitalist, photographer and art collector.

== Research ==
Tropical underwater habitat of the Liquid Jungle Lab

Pelagic fish aggregation near Isla Pacora, Liquid Jungle Lab

A multi-disciplinary approach to research in Terrestrial and Marine Tropical Ecology are conducted between a consortium of scientists and researchers from the Woods Hole Oceanographic Institution, the Smithsonian Tropical Research Institute, and Real Jardin Botanico de Madrid. These organizations and visiting scientists and students use the marine lab facilities and experimental farm to conduct primary and applied research in the fields of tropical island ecology, marine biology, physical oceanography, marine biogeochemistry, aquaculture, genetics, molecular biology, herpetology, botany, ornithology, entomology, ecosystem conservation, island biogeography, geology, fisheries management, tropical forest ecology, agro-forestry, veterinary science, and organic agriculture.

Current areas of marine research at the Liquid Jungle include plankton community dynamics and marine larval ecology and transport, modeling internal waves and benthic structure, coral community architecture and diversity, synoptic chemical mapping, invasive sessile invertebrate species, mangrove and estuarine watersheds, and the effects of natural and anthropogenic nutrient input on primary production and fisheries along Pacific coastal zones.
