= Coastal and Estuarine Research Federation =

U.S. nonprofit organization

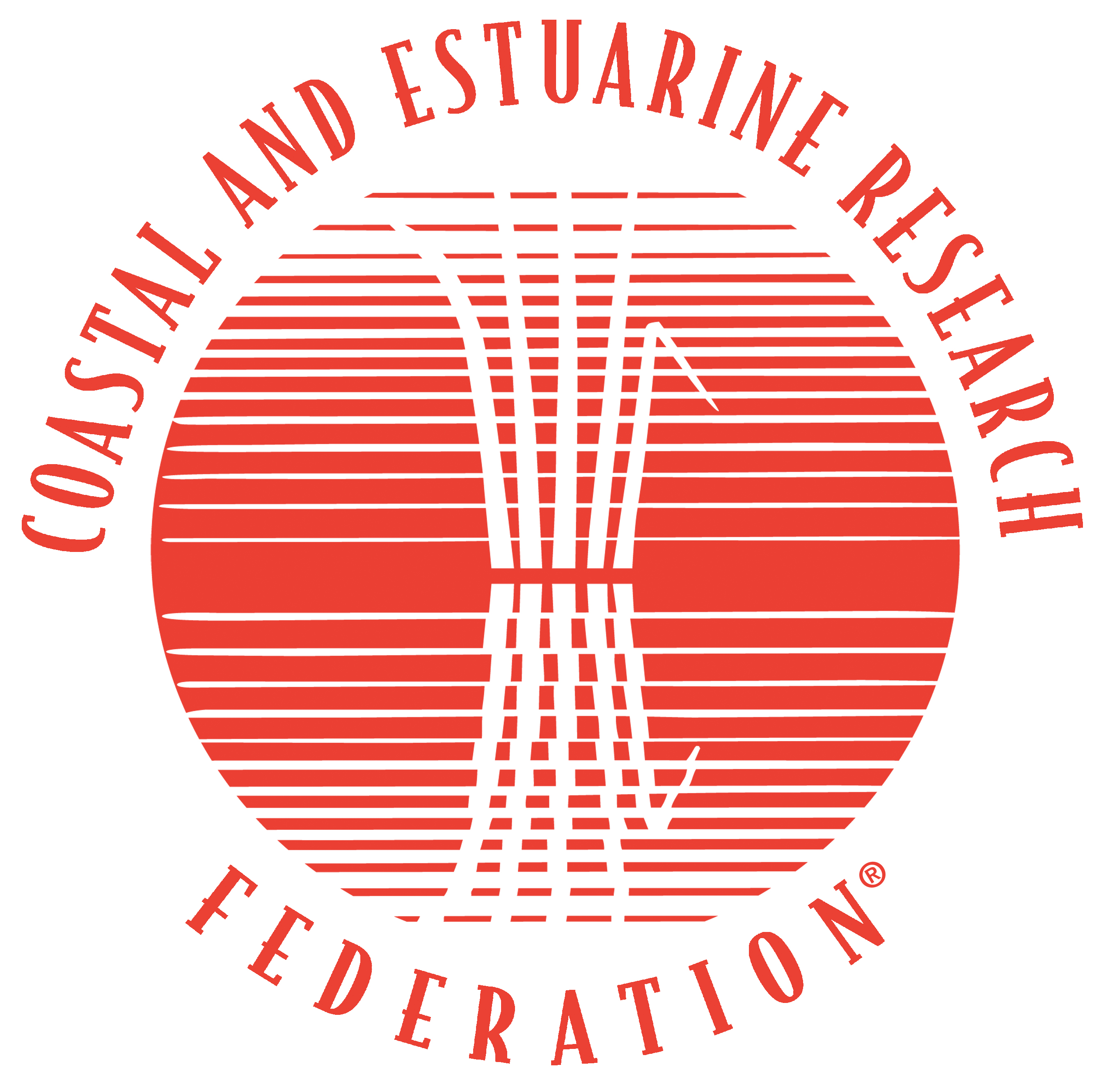
- Abbreviation: CERF
- Formation: 1971
- Type: Nonprofit organization
- President: Sharon Herzka
- Website: www.cerf.science

The Coastal and Estuarine Research Federation (CERF) is a private, nonprofit organization created in 1971. At that time, the members of two regionally based organizations, the Atlantic Estuarine Research Society (AERS) and the New England Estuarine Research Society (NEERS) recognized the need for a third estuarine organization that would address national (now worldwide) estuarine and coastal issues. Today, CERF is a multidisciplinary federation of members and eight regionally-based Affiliate Societies dedicated to the understanding and wise stewardship of estuaries and coasts worldwide.

== Mission ==
CERF’s mission is to advance research, knowledge, and stewardship of coasts and estuaries and sustain the education and professional development of a diverse and inclusive community.

Membership in CERF is open to all who support these goals. The Federation has approximately 1,400 members, and approximately 1,000 more who are members of the Affiliate Societies.

CERF addresses the purposes listed above by convening conferences in odd-numbered years (see Meetings); through the more frequent meetings of its Affiliate Societies in their regions; and through regular publication of the scholarly journal Estuaries and Coasts, the management-focused e-newsletter Coastal and Estuarine Science News (CESN), and the CERF's Up quarterly bulletin. The Federation serves as a source of advice on estuarine and coastal matters by providing policy statements and responding to requests for information from legislative and management organizations. The Federation serves its members and the community through a variety of additional programming, including webinars, online communities of practice, and scholarships and awards.

== History ==
In the mid-1960s estuarine scientists around the globe were beginning to recognize that wide dissemination of information concerning estuarine water circulation patterns, rates of exchange of materials within coastal and marine waters and the ecology of estuarine organisms was essential to the realistic management of estuaries in the future. This wide recognition of the intertwined interest between knowledge of estuarine systems and eutrophication characterizes the task oriented nature of the study of estuaries.

In the Fall of 1969, a special committee was assembled to explore the formation of a new society not dedicated to any particular geographic region in order to accommodate a larger domestic and international membership. The new group known as the Estuarine Research Federation (ERF) was created.

In an effort to identify the true scope of ERF interests to ALL people who may be interested in participating in the Federation's activities, ERF members voted by mail, in the summer of 2007, to approve a name change to Coastal and Estuarine Research Federation (CERF).

== Meetings ==
CERF (formerly ERF) has hosted 27 international conferences during the 55 years since the Federation's inception:

1971 – Long Island, NY	1973 – Myrtle Beach, SC	1975 – Galveston, TX	1977 – Mt. Pocono, PA	1979 – Jekyll Island, GA
1981 – Gleneden Beach, OR	1983 – Virginia Beach, VA	1985 – Durham, NH	1987 – New Orleans, LA	1989 – Baltimore, MD
1991 – San Francisco, CA	1993 – Hilton Head, SC	1995 – Corpus Christi, TX	1997 – Providence RI	1999 – New Orleans, LA
2001 – St Petersburg Beach, FL	2003 – Seattle, WA	2005 – Norfolk, VA	2007 - Providence, RI	2009 – Portland, OR
2011 – Daytona Beach, FL	2012 – Mar del Plata, Argentina	2013 – San Diego, CA	2015 – Portland, OR	2017 – Providence, RI
2019 – Mobile, AL	2021 – Virtual	2023 – Portland, OR	2025 – Richmond, VA	2027 – San Juan, PR

== Leadership ==
CERF has endured and evolved during its short history under the leadership of the individuals listed below. Those who have led the society are important members of the estuarine and coastal science communities. The list provide below includes the name of each president and the most significant scientific contribution made by each individual prior to their Presidencies.

- L. Eugene Cronin, 1971–1973
  "Anatomy and histology of the male reproductive system of Callinectes sapidus rathbun." Journal of Morphology 1947
- H. Perry Jeffries, 1973–1975
  "A stress syndrome in hard clam Mercenaria mercenaria." Journal of Invertebrate Pathology 1972
- F. John Vernberg, 1975–1977
  "Studies on the physiological variation between tropical and temperate zone fiddler crabs of the genus UCA.2. Oxygen Consumption of whole organisms." Biological Bulletin 1959
- Michael Castagna 1977–1979
  "Culture of bay scallop, Argopecten irradians, in Virginia." Marine Fisheries Review 1975
- Robert J. Reimold, 1979–1981
  "Movement of phosphorus through salt marsh cord grass, Spartina alterniflora loisel." Limnology and Oceanography 1972
- Barbara L. Welsh, 1981–1983
  "Role of grass shrimp, Palaemonetes pugio, in a tidal marsh ecosystem." Ecology 1975
- Austin Beatty Williams, 1983–1985
  "Swimming crabs of the genus Callinectes (decapoda portunidae)." Fishery Bulletin 1974
- Jerry R. Schubel, 1985–1987
  "Turbidity maximum of northern Chesapeake Bay" Science 1968
- Donald F. Boesch, 1987–1989
  "Classification and community structure of macrobenthos in Hampton Roads area, Virginia." Marine Biology 1973
- Robert J. Orth, 1989–1991
  "Chesapeake Bay- An unprecedented decline in submerged aquatic vegetation." Science 1983
- Christopher F. D'Elia, 1991–1993
  "Determination of total nitrogen in aqueous samples using persulfate digestion." Limnology and Oceanography 1977
- Frederic H. Nichols, 1993–1995
  "The modification of an estuary." Science 1986
- Candace A. Oviatt, 1995–1997
  "Patterns of productivity during eutrophication – A mesocosm experiment." Marine Ecology Progress Series 1986
- Nancy N. Rabalais, 1997–1999
  "Comparison of continuous records of near-bottom dissolved oxygen from the hypoxia zone along the Louisiana Coast." Estuaries 1994
- Anne E. Giblin, 1999–2001
  "Biogeochemical diversity along a riverside toposequence in Arctic Alaska." Ecological Monographs. 1991
- Dennis M. Allen, 2001–2003
  "Interannual variation in larval fish recruitment to estuarine epibenthic habitats." Marine Ecology Progress Series 1990
- Linda C. Schaffner, 2003–2005
  "Small-scale organism distributions and patterns of species diversity – Evidence for positive interactions in an estuarine benthic community." Marine Ecology Progress Series 1990
- Robert R. Christian, 2005–2007
  "Multiyear distribution patterns of nutrients within the Neuse River estuary, North Carolina." Marine Ecology Progress Series 1991
- Robert W. Howarth, 2007–2009
  "Nutrient limitation of net primary production in marine ecosystems." Annual Review of Ecology and Systematics 1998
- Susan L. Williams, 2009–2011
  "Experimental studies of Caribbean seagrass bed development." Ecological Monographs 1990
- Walter R. Boynton 2011–2013
  "Inputs, transformations and transport of nitrogen and phosphorus in Chesapeake Bay and selected tributaries." Estuaries 1995
- Kenneth L. Heck Jr. 2013–2015
  "Explicit calculation of the rarefaction diversity measurement and the determination of sufficient sample size." Ecology 1975
- Robert R. Twilley, 2015–2017
  "The exchange of organic carbon in basin mangrove forests in a southwest Florida estuary." Estuarine, Coastal and Shelf Science 1985
- Hilary A. Neckles, 2017–2019
  "Relative effects of nutrient enrichment and grazing on epiphyte-macrophyte (Zostera marina L.) dynamics." Oecologia 1993
- James W. Fourqurean, 2019–2021
  "Seagrass ecosystems as a globally significant carbon stock." Nature Geoscience 2012
- Leila Hamdan, 2021–2023
  "Effects of COREXIT EC9500A on bacteria from a beach oiled by the Deepwater Horizon spill." Aquatic Microbial Ecology 2011
- Linda Blum, 2023–2025
  "Spartina alterniflora root dynamics in a Virginia marsh." Marine Ecology Progress Series 1993
- Sharon Herzka, 2025–2027
  "Assessing connectivity of estuarine fishes based on stable isotope ratio analysis." Estuarine, Coastal and Shelf Science 2005

== Publications ==
CERF publishes the journal Estuaries and Coasts. Prior to 2006 Estuaries and Coasts was known as Estuaries. Prior to the formation of CERF, the journal Estuaries was known as Chesapeake Science (1960–1978).

== Affiliate societies ==
- Atlantic Canada Coastal Estuarine Science Society (ACCESS)
- Atlantic Estuarine Research Society (AERS)
- Association of Marine Laboratories of the Caribbean (AMLC)
- California Estuarine Research Society (CAERS)
- Gulf Estuarine Research Society (GERS)
- New England Estuarine Research Society (NEERS)
- Pacific Estuarine Research Society (PERS)
- Southeastern Estuarine Research Society (SEERS)

== See also ==
- Chesapeake Bay
- Long Island Sound
- The National Estuarine Research Reserve System
