= Estuaries and Coasts =

- Discipline: Environmental Sciences
- Language: English
- Edited by: Just Cebrian, Paul Montagna, and Melisa Wong

Publication details
- Former name(s): Chesapeake Science, Estuaries
- History: 1960-present
- Publisher: Springer Nature
- Frequency: 6/year
- Impact factor: 2.3 (2024)

Standard abbreviations
- ISO 4: Estuaries Coasts

Indexing
- ISSN: 1559-2723 (print); 1559-2731 (web)

Links
- Journal homepage; Online access

Estuaries and Coasts is a peer-reviewed scientific journal published by Springer Nature and the official journal of the Coastal and Estuarine Research Federation. It was established in 1960 as Chesapeake Science by Romeo J. Mansueti, covering research results and management studies on natural resources of the Chesapeake Bay region. In 1977, the journal was acquired by the Coastal and Estuarine Research Federation and in 1978 it was renamed Estuaries. It obtained its current name in 2006 (Vol. 29, Issue 1). Chesapeake Science was published and partially subsidized by the Chesapeake Biological Laboratory during its 18-year history. The co-editors-in-chief are Just Cebrian (King Abdullah University of Science and Technology), Paul Montagna (Harte Research Institute for Gulf of Mexico Studies at Texas A&M University–Corpus Christi), and Melisa Wong (Fisheries and Oceans Canada).

The journal has a 2024 impact factor of 2.3.

== Scope ==
Estuaries and Coasts publishes scholarly manuscripts on estuarine and near coastal ecosystems at the interface between the land and the sea where there are tidal fluctuations or sea water is diluted by fresh water. The interface is broadly defined to include estuaries and nearshore coastal waters including lagoons, wetlands, tidal fresh water, shores, beaches, and reefs but not the continental shelf. The journal covers research on physical, chemical, geological or biological processes, as well as applications to management of estuaries and coasts. The journal publishes original research findings, reviews and perspectives, techniques, comments, and management applications. The Estuary and Coast Signatures collection allows for publication of Brief Reports that are primarily descriptive or strongly place-based.
