= RV Endeavor =

Research ship

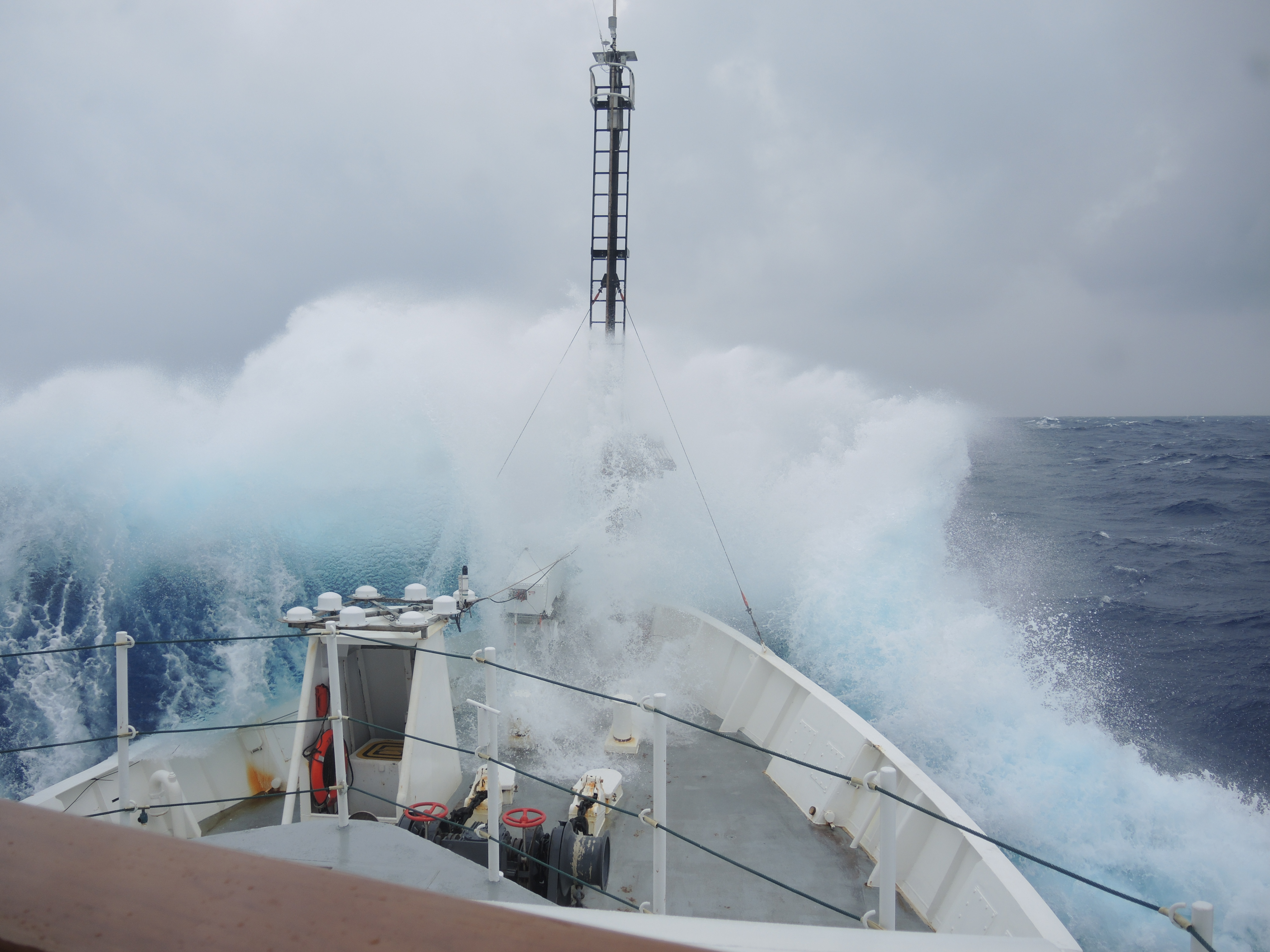
- Wave crashing on Endeavor's bow.

History

United States
- Name: RV Endeavor
- Owner: National Science Foundation
- Operator: University of Rhode Island's Graduate School of Oceanography (GSO)
- Port of registry: U.S.
- Builder: Peterson Builders, Inc., Sturgeon Bay, WI.
- Laid down: 1975
- Acquired: November 1976
- Identification: IMO number: 7604300; MMSI number: 303471000; Callsign: WCE5063
- Fate: Unknown
- Status: Decommissioned
- Notes: Designed by John Gilbert Associates; Replaced RV Trident; mid-life refit at Peterson Builders, Inc. in 1993

General characteristics
- Tonnage: 298 GRT
- Length: 185 feet OA, 165 feet WL
- Beam: 33 feet
- Draught: 19 feet 6 inches (aft)
- Propulsion: 1 GM/EMD diesel engine; 3,050 shaft HP @ 900 RPM (maximum), Single screw with controllable pitch, Kort steering nozzle; J. Samual White Waterjet, 320 HP, DC variable speed and direction bow thruster
- Speed: 10 knots
- Capacity: Maximum Scientific Load: 89,600 pounds (of which the 01 deck is limited to 22,400 pounds)
- Crew: 12 Crew, Up to 18 Scientists
- Notes: Sister ship of RV Oceanus at Woods Hole Oceanographic Institution and RV Wecoma at Oregon State University

RV Endeavor is a research vessel owned by the National Science Foundation and operated by the University of Rhode Island (URI) under a Charter Party Agreement as part of the University-National Oceanographic Laboratory System (UNOLS) fleet. The vessel is homeported at the Narragansett, Rhode Island at the URI Bay Campus.

The 185-foot (56 m) Endeavor, built by Peterson Builders, Inc., Sturgeon Bay, Wisconsin, replaced RV Trident in 1976.

She likely was named for Captain James Cook's ship HMS Endeavour, for which the Space Shuttle Endeavour is also named.
