= Hatfield Marine Science Center =

Marine science research and education center in Oregon

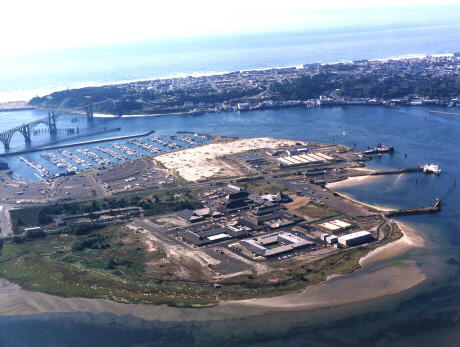
- Campus on Yaquina Bay
- Interactive map of the Hatfield Marine Science Center area

General information
- Location: Lincoln County, Oregon, United States
- Coordinates: 44°37′09″N 124°02′44″W
- Opened: 1965

Website
- hmsc.oregonstate.edu

The Hatfield Marine Science Center (HMSC) is Oregon State University's (OSU) coastal campus for marine science research, education and outreach. HMSC encompasses OSU Marine Operations, PacWave and the Port Orford Field Station.

The main HMSC facility is located in Newport, Oregon, next to Yaquina Bay of the Pacific Ocean. It is operated by Oregon State University in cooperation with six state and federal agencies co-located on site. These agencies include NOAA, USDA, EPA, USFWS, ODFW, Oregon Sea Grant.

Named after Mark Hatfield, a former U.S. Senator from Oregon, the HMSC occupies a 49-acre (20 ha) site in Newport.

== History ==
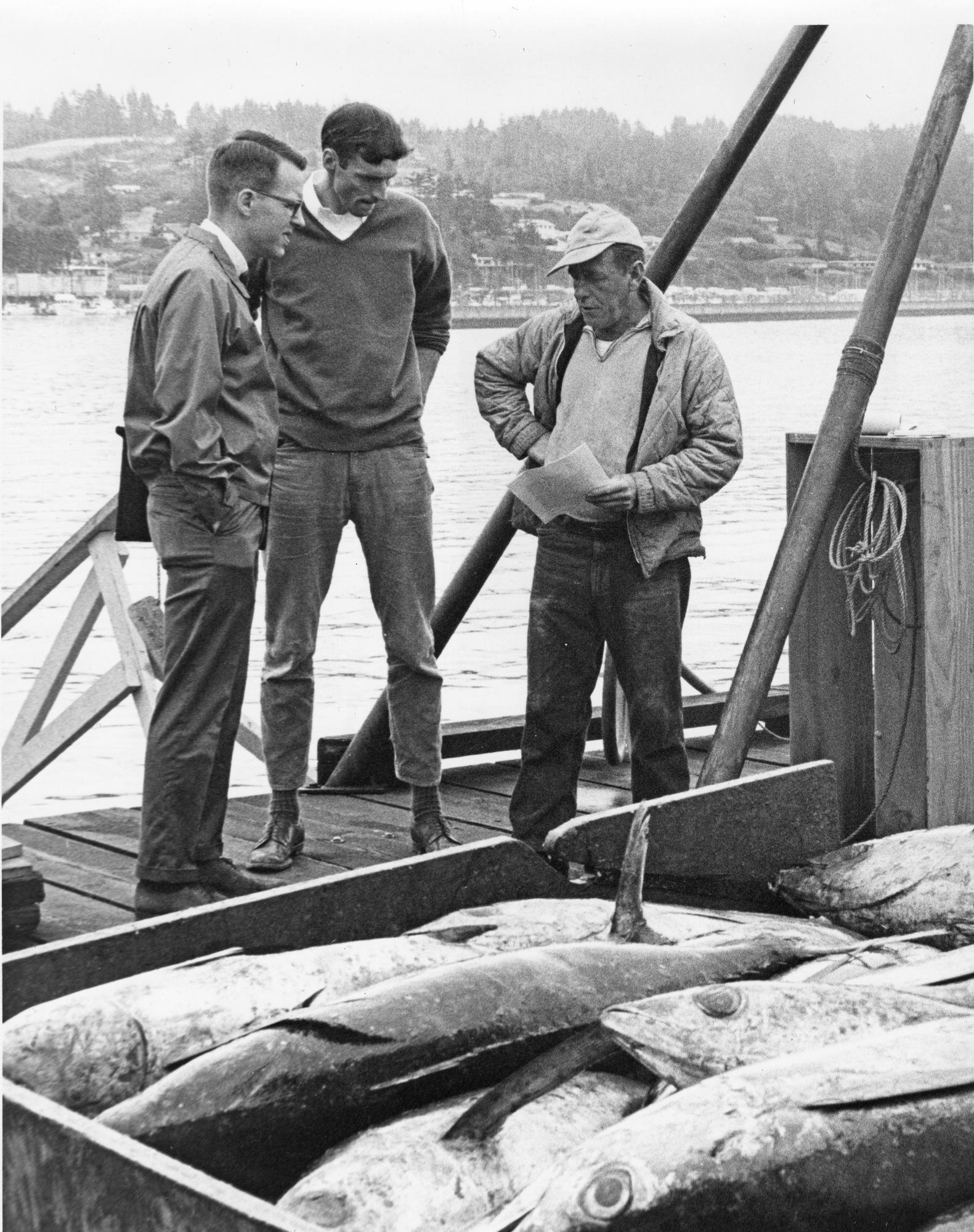
Dan Panshin and Bob Jacobson talk to an albacore tuna fisherman in Newport, 1965

The Hatfield Marine Science Center was opened in 1965. The center was preceded by the Yaquina Bay Fisheries Laboratory, which was established in 1939 on the opposite side of Yaquina Bay.

After several years of development, the Gladys Valley Marine Studies Building (MSB) was completed in summer 2020. The building hosts new office and laboratory space, a 250-seat auditorium and a cafe. The building provides a tsunami evacuation point for more than 900 people, including local residents, and it is designed to withstand a 9+ magnitude earthquake and an XXL tsunami event. The 70-foot (21 m) skeleton of a blue whale was installed on the campus in 2026, after having washed ashore in 2015 at Gold Beach.

== Organization ==
More than 425 federal and state staff work at the HMSC, including Oregon State University faculty, graduate students, researchers, and staff from agencies including Oregon Department of Fish and Wildlife, U.S. Fish and Wildlife Service, U.S. Environmental Protection Agency, U.S. Department of Agriculture, and the National Oceanic and Atmospheric Administration (NOAA). NOAA employees at the HMSC are affiliated with the Alaska Fisheries Science Center, The Fisheries Science Center, or the Pacific Marine Environmental Laboratory, maintains a shared research location in Seattle, Washington.

== Visitor Center ==
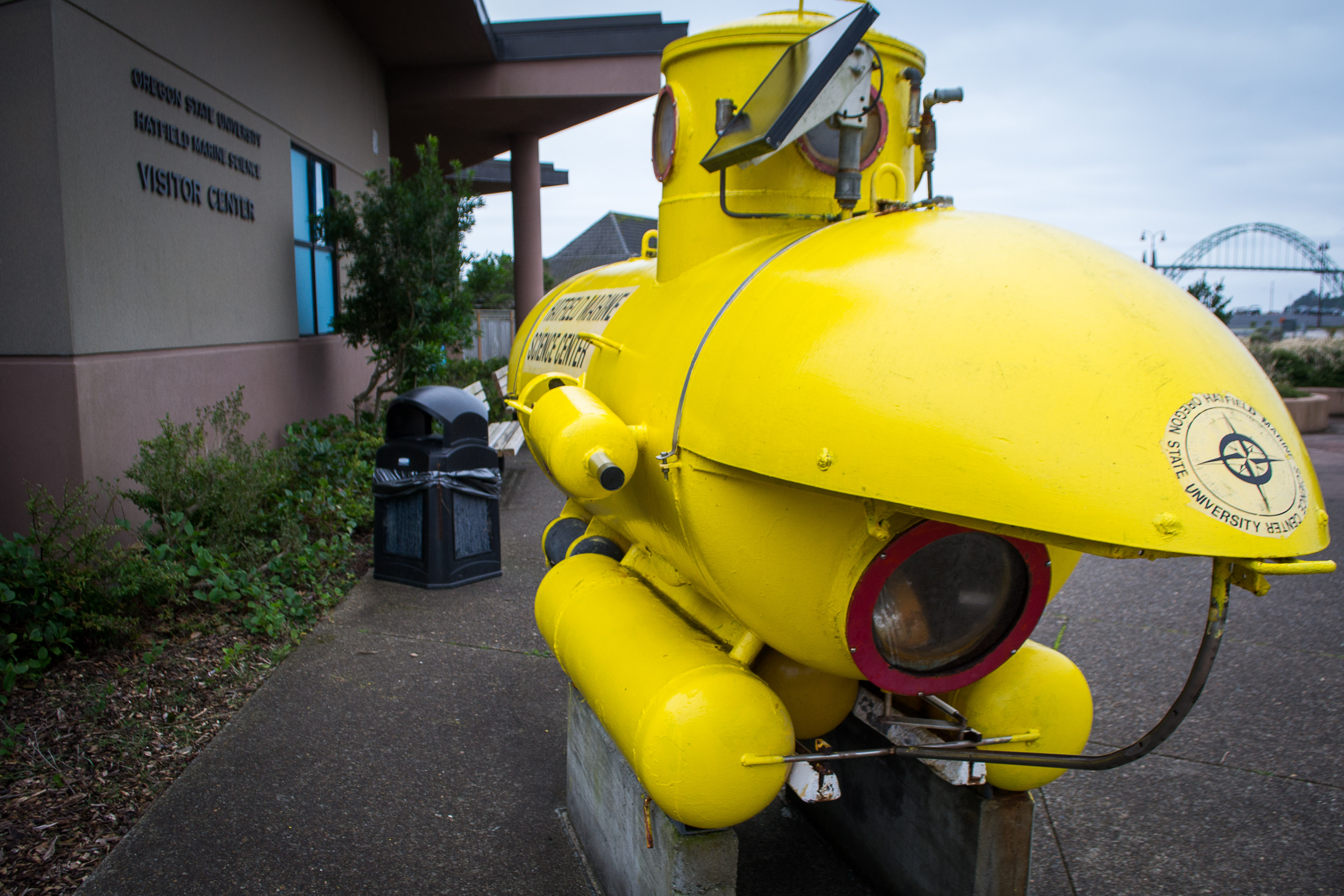
The retired Newmas manned submersible on display.

The Hatfield Marine Science Visitor Center is the public education wing of the HMSC. The visitor center's exhibits focus on marine species, marine research, and the coastal environment. The visitor center offers public programs and tours and is open year-round.

Live marine animals on display include a Giant Pacific octopus. The octopus can be viewed remotely through the live HMSC OctoCam. Other exhibits focus on weather, tsunami, commercial fishing, ocean resource management, microscopic sea life, and tide-pool creatures and habitats. The Newmas, a locally built, 13-foot two-person submersible, is displayed outside the visitor center.

== Education ==
Approximately 900 undergraduate and graduate students study at HMSC annually. The Harbor Street Housing facility was completed in 2025 and adds to onsite learning opportunities for students as well as visiting researchers.

== Research Partnerships ==
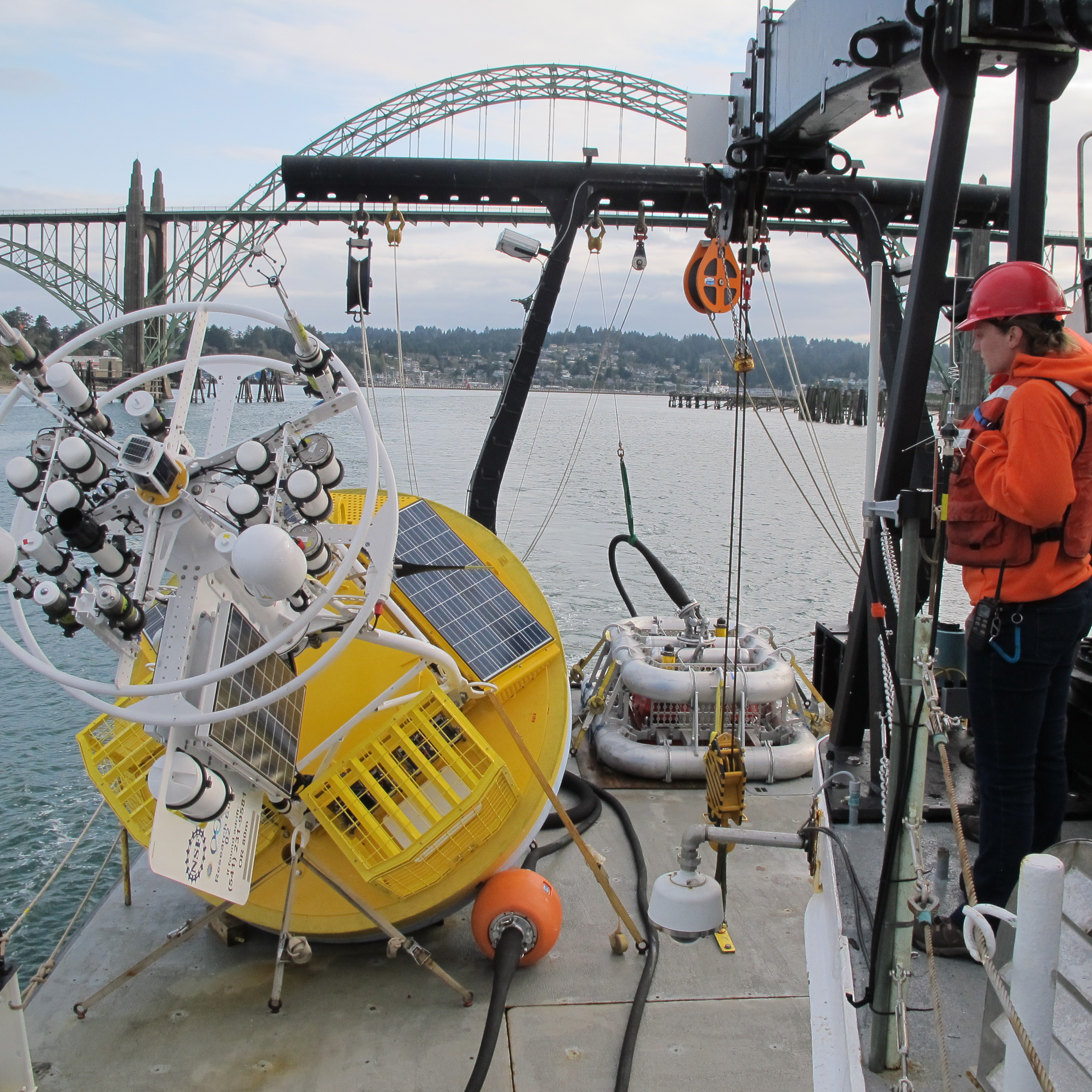
An OSU marine technician prepares a surface mooring

HMSC hosts multiple research partnerships between Oregon State University and external organizations.

The Cooperative Institute for Marine Ecosystems and Resources Studies (CIMERS) conducts interdisciplinary research covering fisheries science, aquaculture, marine ecosystems and climate, oceanography, geology, acoustics and marine-resource technology. In addition to HMSC employees, CIMERS involves staff from NOAA's Northwest Fisheries Science Center, the Alaska Fisheries Science Center, and Pacific Marine Environmental Laboratory.

The Coastal Oregon Marine Experiment Station (COMES) is an agricultural research station dedicated to research and development for Oregon’s fishing, aquaculture and seafood, and helps to facilitate OSU's service as a land-grant university for coastal communities. COMES is the largest of 12 branch agricultural research stations in Oregon. COMES is also hosted at the Seafood Research & Education Center in Astoria.

The Marine Mammal Institute (MMI) focuses on research on marine mammals, incorporating research on ecology, genetics, veterinary medicine, engineering, aquaculture, and communications.

The Northwest National Marine Renewable Energy Center (NNMREC) is a collaboration between Oregon State University and the University of Washington, and was founded with funding from the U.S. Department of Energy. It is one of three Marine Renewable Energy centers for Oregon State University, with research focused on wave and tidal energy.

The Northwest Association of Networked Ocean Observing Systems (NANOOS) is a collaboration between Oregon State University and the U.S. Environmental Protection Agency, which hosts oceanographic monitoring data collected at Yaquina Bay.

== Research fleet ==
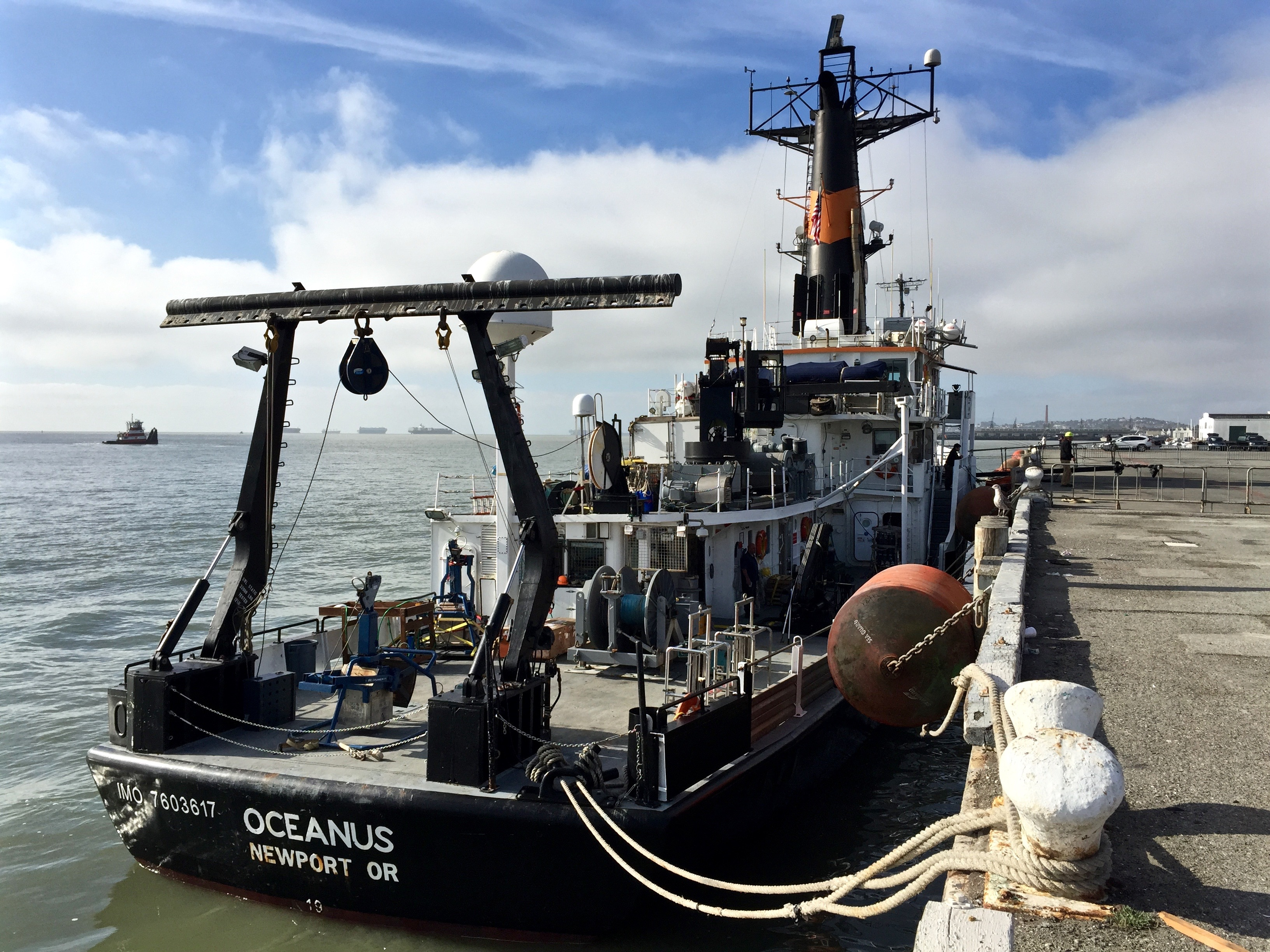
R/V Oceanus at dock in San Francisco

OSU Marine Operations operates research vessels and smaller boats at HMSC. In addition, the NOAA Marine Operations Center-Pacific (MOC-P), adjacent to HMSC, is also the home port for the NOAAS Bell M. Shimada and the NOAAS Rainier. HMSC staff frequently use these research vessels.

=== Current vessels ===
- R/V Taani – 199 feet long, in development
- R/V Pacific Storm - 84 feet
- R/V Elakha – 54 feet long

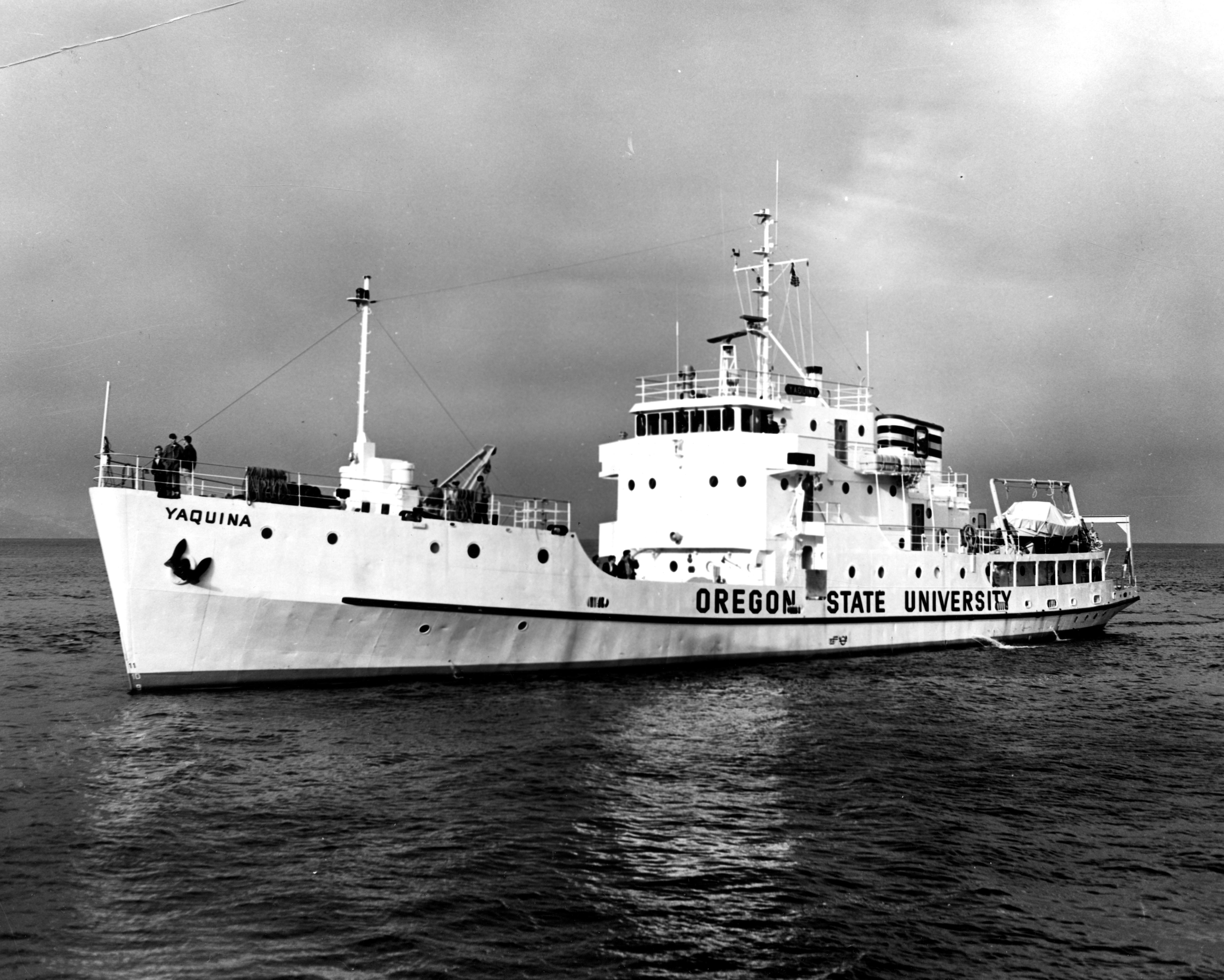
R/V Yaquina at sea

=== Retired vessels ===
- R/V Oceanus
- R/V Acona
- R/V Cayuse – 80 feet long
- R/V Wecoma – 184.5 feet long
- R/V Yaquina – 180 feet long

== People ==
=== Directors ===
- Belinda Batten, 2026-present
- Lisa Ballance 2025-2026
- Bob Cowen 2013 – 2025
- George Boehlert 2002 – 2012
- Lavern Weber 1977 – 2002
- John Byrne 1972 – 1977

=== Notable faculty and staff (past and present) ===
- Scott Baker
- Lisa Ballance
- Wayne Burt
- Joel Hedgpeth

=== Notable alumni ===
- Rick Spinrad, 11th Administrator of NOAA (2021-)

== See also ==
- Oregon Coast Aquarium, a nearby tourist attraction in Newport, Oregon
- Sea Lion Caves, a nearby tourist attraction near Florence, Oregon
- Oregon Institute of Marine Biology, a related institution associated with the University of Oregon on the southern Oregon coast
- Moss Landing Marine Laboratories, a multi-campus marine research consortium of the California State University System
- Hopkins Marine Station, a similar research facility run by Stanford University in Monterey, California
- Scripps Institution of Oceanography, a similar research facility associated with the University of California, San Diego and located in La Jolla, California
- Woods Hole Oceanographic Institution, a similar research facility located in Woods Hole, Massachusetts
