= Sea Lion Caves =

Cave system in Oregon, United States

Coordinates: 44.1224°N 124.1276°W

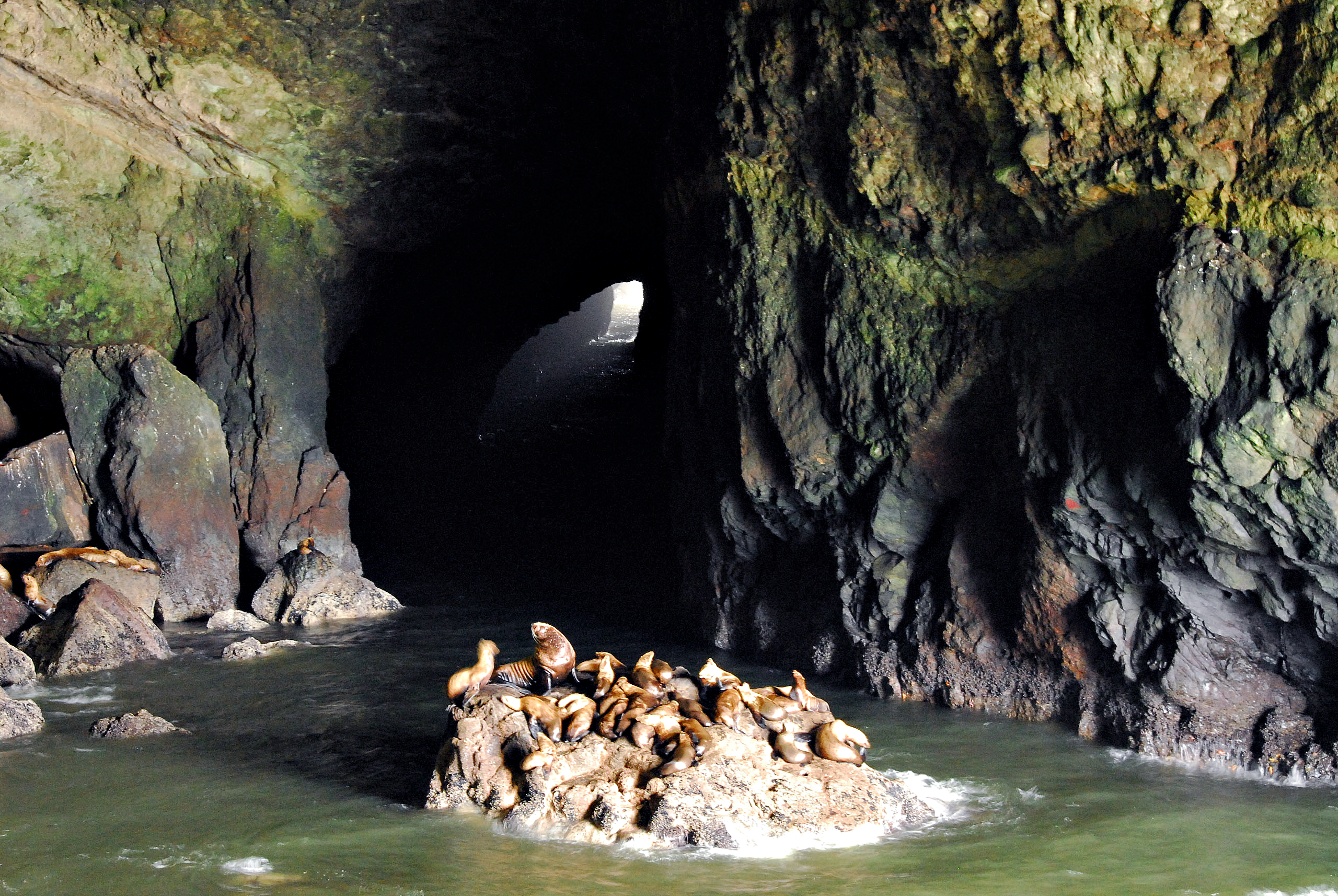
- Sea lions inside the caves
- Interactive map of Sea Lion Caves
- Location: Florence, Oregon
- Geology: Littoral
- Entrances: 3
- Difficulty: novice
- Access: private, with admission

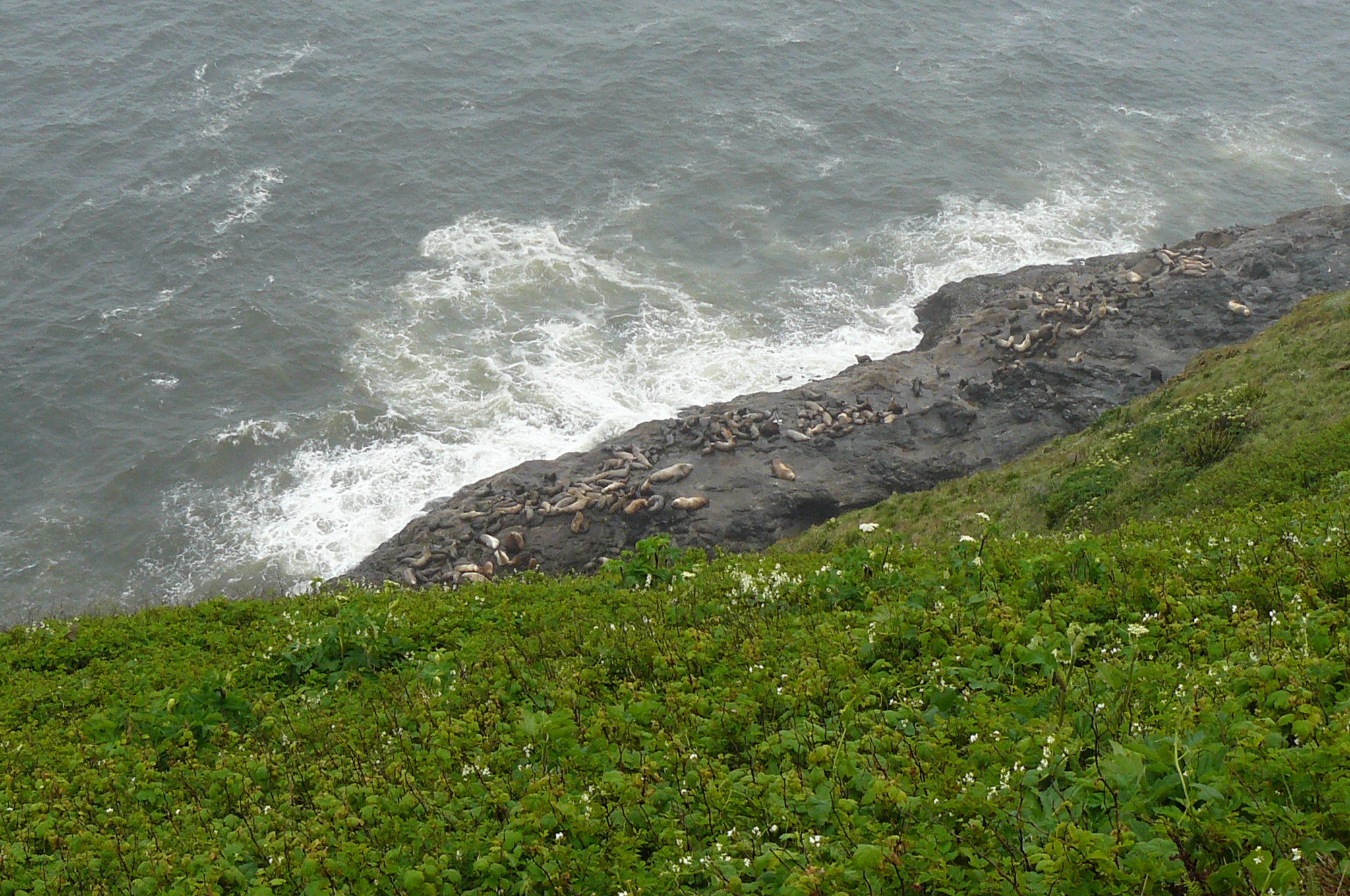
Sea lions with pups outside the caves

Sea Lion Caves is a connected system of sea caves and caverns open to the Pacific Ocean in the U.S. state of Oregon. They are located 11 miles (18 km) north of Florence on U.S. Highway 101, about midpoint on the 400 miles (640 km) of Oregon Coast. In this area, Highway 101 follows a steep and undeveloped seascape 300 feet (91 m) above sea level. Human access to the caves is through a gift shop building.

== Description ==
The cave system is at sea level and the ocean continually washes into the main cavern which has a floor area of about 2 acres (0.81 ha) and a vaulted rock dome about 125 feet (38 m) high. Southward from the main chamber, a low passage runs 1,000 feet (300 m) to a sea level opening. This corridor is flooded at high tide and free of water at low tide. The western entrance is a short, high passage through which the ocean washes at all tide levels. At the north, a third entrance is about 50 feet (15 m) above the ocean which serves as an elevated observation area where the entire cave system and its wildlife are visible.

Lichens, algae, and mineral stains cover the cavern walls with greens, pinks, purples, buffs, and reds on the rough surfaces, some of which are named Lincoln's Head, the Indian Maiden, and The Goddess of Liberty.

The sea level portion of this cave and the sea cliff rocks just outside the cave have become, over the centuries, the only known mainland rookery and hauling area (wintering home) of the Steller's sea lion and—to a lesser extent—the California sea lion.

The high vault is a natural resting place for sea birds. Many birds make their home at or near the Sea Lion Caves such as the pigeon guillemot, Brandt's cormorant, western, herring, and California gulls, tufted puffins, and the occasional hawk or bald eagle.

Sea Lion Caves is one of the great sea caves of the world, and currently ranks 10th among the world's longest sea caves. With a measured length of 1,315 feet, it is the longest in the United States. A comparable cave is the undeveloped Painted Cave on Santa Cruz Island, California, which is 1,227 feet long.

The whale watching deck, located below the gift shop, permits a seaward view of approximately 20 miles (32 km). The deck is at an elevation of 300 feet (91 m), making it a popular whale watching post. Typically, orcas are seen migrating once a year past the Sea Lion Caves, whereas the gray whale is seen anywhere from a few months to all year long. Small groups sometimes end their migration in the immediate vicinity, feeding very close to the shore.

== History ==
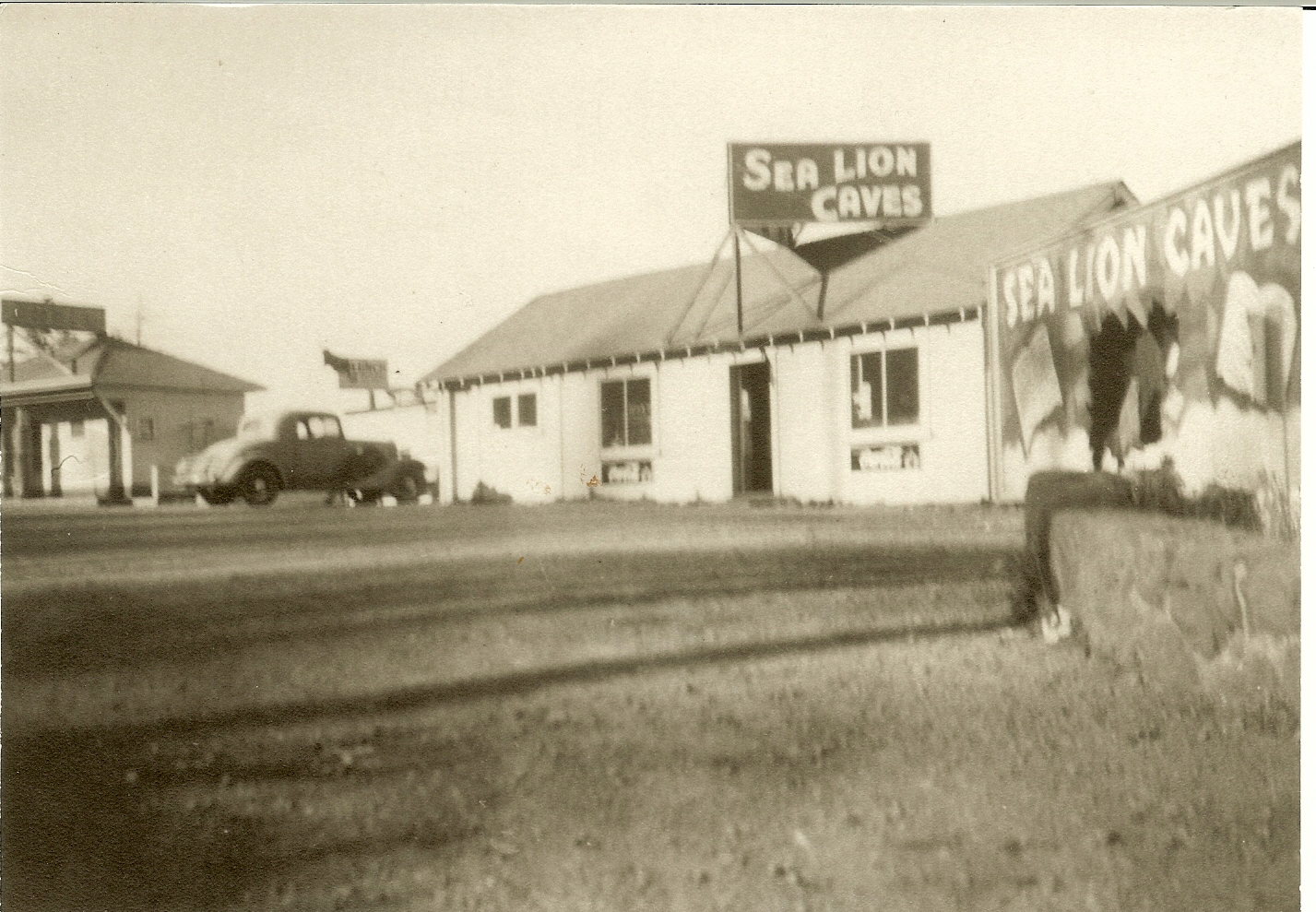
The gift shop in the early 1930s

Sea Lion Caves were discovered in 1880 by a local seaman, Captain William Cox, who entered the grotto through the western channel in a small boat on a calm day. He reportedly returned to explore the caves a number of times and on one occasion was marooned for several days because of stormy weather and rough ocean. He reportedly sustained himself by shooting a young sea lion and eating the meat of its flippers. Regardless of the incident's authenticity, it is established that Captain Cox purchased the land in 1887 from the State of Oregon. His family owned the property until 1926.

There were no roads in the area at that time. The slopes of the rocky headlands were used for sheep pasture.

Access to the caves from the hillside above was not even considered until after the land was acquired by R. E. Clanton in 1927, with the specific intention of opening the caves as a business. In 1930, when it became probable that U.S. Route 101 would be completed going past the site, Clanton was joined by J. G. Houghton, and J. E. Jacobson. The three partners decided to risk all their money to build a safe access to the cave. A 1,500-foot-long (460 m) trail was excavated by hand into the face of the cliff. At the bottom, a 135 step wooden tower was extended down to the north entrance of the caves. Despite the difficulty and danger of the construction, the trail and stairs provided safe access for visitors and the Sea Lion Caves opened to the public in August 1932.

The traffic was light at first. The highway was a gravel road until 1934, and until 1937 there were five ferry crossings within 100 miles to traverse the highway. However, word of the attraction spread and the number of people visiting the Sea Lion Caves slowly grew until 1942, when virtually all recreational travel halted due to World War II. Meanwhile, Clanton withdrew from the partnership in 1934 and R. A. Saubert became part owner. The three families operated the Sea Lion Caves until 2006, when the Saubert and Jacobson families took over the partnership.

In 1961, the addition of an elevator resulted in a sharp rise in the number of visitors. The elevator took three years to build, but by June 1961, Otis Elevator Company completed the elevator. It has a capacity of 23 passengers and travels 208 feet (63 m) at 250 feet per minute (2.8 miles per hour (4.5 km/h)). It can accommodate 400 people per hour. In 2016, a new elevator was installed.

== See also ==
- Oregon Coast Aquarium, a nearby tourist attraction in Newport, Oregon
- Hatfield Marine Science Center, a nearby research facility and tourist attraction in Newport, Oregon
