= Oregon Undersea Gardens =

Former aquarium in Newport, Oregon, U.S.

- Interactive map of Oregon Undersea Gardens
- 44°37′49.1″N 124°3′6.9″W
- Date opened: 1966
- Date closed: 2019
- Location: Newport, Oregon, U.S.

Oregon Undersea Gardens was an underwater aquarium in Newport, Oregon, United States. The tourist attraction opened in 1966, and plans to close were announced in 2019.

== See also ==
- Oregon Coast Aquarium
