= RV Wecoma =

Coordinates: 44.625679°N 124.044826°W

History

United States
- Name: Wecoma
- Owner: National Science Foundation
- Operator: Oregon State University College of Earth, Ocean, and Atmospheric Sciences
- In service: 1975
- Out of service: 2012
- Refit: 1994
- Homeport: Newport, Or
- Identification: IMO number: 7604439; MMSI number: 303014000; Callsign: WSD7079
- Fate: Decommissioned and scrapped, 2012

General characteristics
- Displacement: 1150 long tons
- Length: 184.5 ft (56.4 m)
- Beam: 33 ft (10.1 m)
- Draft: 18.5 ft (5.6 m)
- Propulsion: Diesel, controllable-pitch propeller
- Speed: 12 kn (22 km/h), 14 kn (26 km/h) max
- Range: 7,200 nmi (13,300 km)
- Endurance: 30 days
- Capacity: 60 long ton
- Complement: 13 civilian mariners, 18 scientific party
- Armament: none

RV Wecoma is a research vessel owned by the National Science Foundation and operated by the College of Oceanic & Atmospheric Sciences at Oregon State University (OSU) as a member of the University-National Oceanographic Laboratory System (UNOLS) fleet. It is based in Newport in the U.S. state of Oregon near OSU's Hatfield Marine Science Center. Launched in 1975, it has a maximum displacement of 1,150 long tons (1,168 t).

The 184.5-foot (56.2 m) ship is equipped with 1,174 square feet (109.1 m^{2}) of laboratory space to support up to 18 scientists at sea. It has a variety of equipment permanently installed, and optional additional equipment available on request, to measure and analyze navigational data; surface atmospheric conditions; sea surface temperature, salinity, fluorescence; bottom depth; dissolved oxygen titration; solar radiation; GPS time; bioacoustics; and geological sampling. The range of depths of submerged equipment varies from 3,000 to 6,000 metres (9,800 to 19,700 ft). The vessel can support diving operations, radioactive isotope materials, and explosive materials.

Wecoma made her last operational cruise November 2011 and was scheduled to be retired with the interim replacement ship being the former Woods Hole Oceanographic Institution operated R/V Oceanus.
