= RV Oceanus =

Research vessel operated by Oregon State University

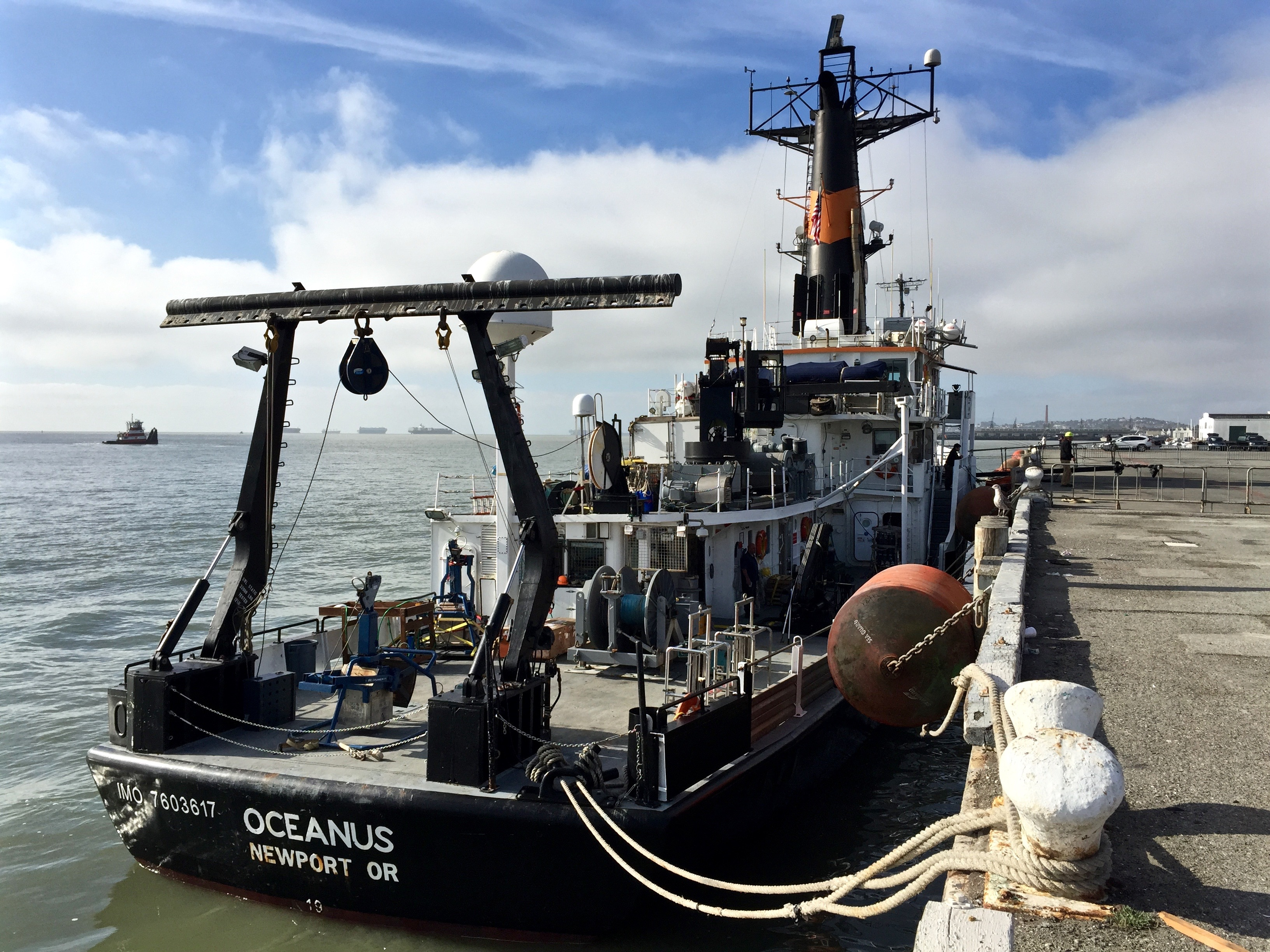
- RV Oceanus at San Francisco

History

United States
- Name: Oceanus
- Namesake: Titan Oceanus of Greek mythology
- Owner: National Science Foundation
- Operator: Oregon State University, College of Earth, Ocean, and Atmospheric Sciences
- Port of registry: U.S.
- Builder: Peterson Builders, Sturgeon Bay, Wisconsin
- Completed: 1975
- Maiden voyage: April 1976
- Home port: Newport, Oregon
- Identification: IMO number: 7603617; MMSI number: 367977000; Callsign: WXAQ
- Status: Disposed

General characteristics
- Type: Regional class (University-National Oceanographic Laboratory System classification)
- Tonnage: 260.68 GT
- Displacement: 960 long tons (980 t)
- Length: 177 ft (54 m)
- Beam: 33 ft (10 m)
- Draft: 17.5 ft (5.3 m)
- Propulsion: 1 EMD diesel engine, 3,000 shp (2,200 kW); 350 hp (260 kW) trainable bow thruster
- Speed: 16 knots (30 km/h; 18 mph)
- Range: 7,000 nmi (13,000 km; 8,100 mi)
- Endurance: 30 days
- Crew: 12, with up to 19 project personnel

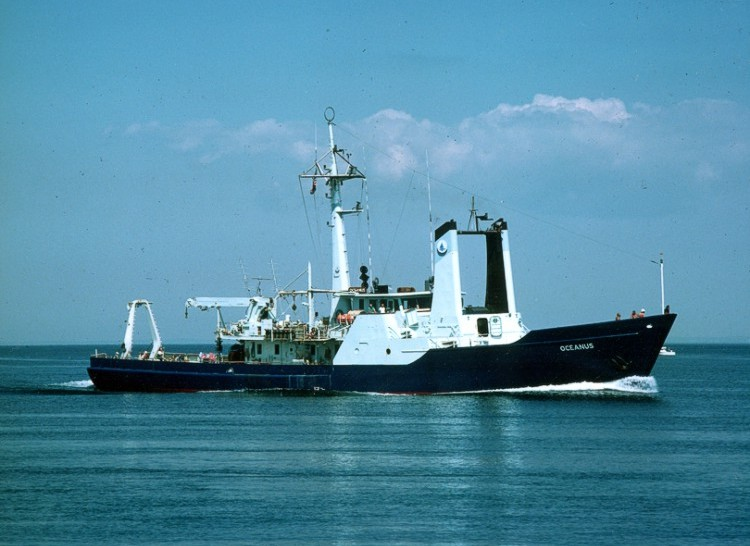
Oceanus, shown prior to a 1994 midlife refit

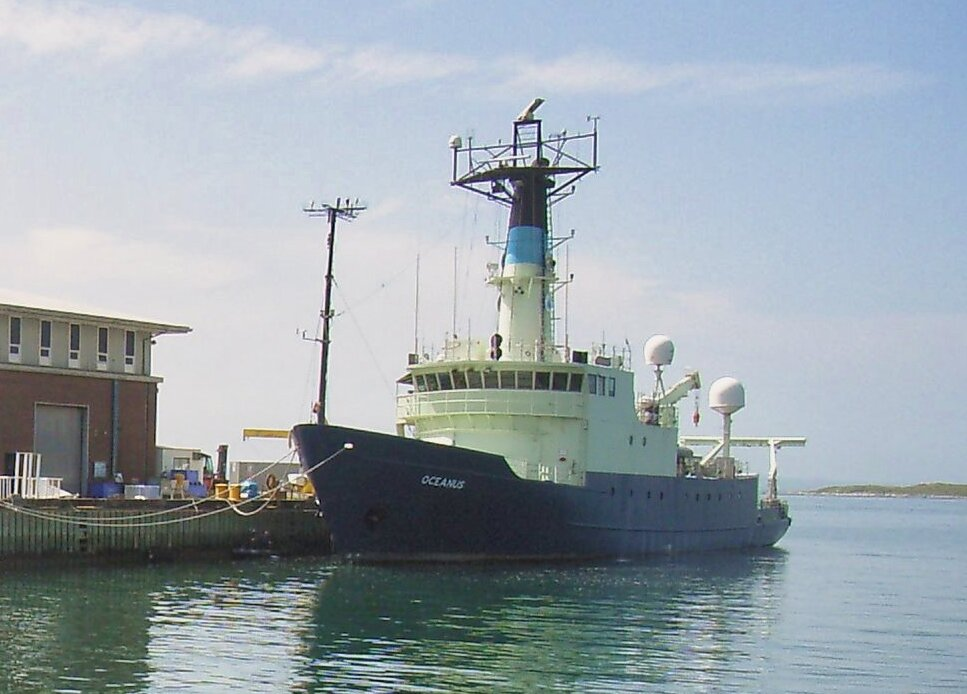
RV Oceanus at Woods Hole Oceanographic Institution, May 2009

RV Oceanus is a Regional-class research vessel owned by the National Science Foundation, based in Newport, Oregon, and maintained and operated by Oregon State University. The ship was originally delivered to the Woods Hole Oceanographic Institution (WHOI) for operation as a part of the U.S. Academic Research Fleet as a University-National Oceanographic Laboratory System (UNOLS) designated operator. in November 1975. Oceanus made the first operational cruise in April 1976 and operated under WHOI for thirty-six years in the Atlantic Ocean with some operations in the Mediterranean and Caribbean seas. The ship was scheduled to be retired in November 2011 but instead was transferred to Oregon State University, College of Earth, Ocean, and Atmospheric Sciences, for operation, replacing sister ship, RV Wecoma.

On January 25, 2012 the ship began transit to Newport, Oregon and the Hatfield Marine Science Center for operation by Oregon State University. Oceanus arrived in Newport, Oregon on February 21, 2012 ahead of the March retirement of sister ship Wecoma. Oceanus was an interim replacement during the period while NSF began the design and construction of three new Regional-class research vessels, the first of which is expected to be launched in 2023 and to be operated by OSU under the name RCRV Taani for NSF.

Oceanus was built by Peterson Builders of Sturgeon Bay, Wisconsin to a design by John W. Gilbert Associates, Boston, completed 1975 with a mid-life refit in 1994. The ship is 177 feet (54 m) in length with a 33-foot (10 m) beam and 17.5-foot (5.3 m) draft powered by a single EMD diesel engine of 3,000 shaft horsepower (2,200 kW) for a cruising speed of 11 knots (20 km/h; 13 mph) with a 7,000-nautical-mile (13,000 km; 8,100 mi) range. She carries a crew of 12 with capacity for up to 19 project personnel with 1,185 square feet (110.1 m^{2}) of laboratory space.

Oceanus was described by WHOI as "the North Atlantic workhorse of the WHOI-UNOLS fleet", used extensively in Gulf Stream and ocean circulation systems.
