= Lisa Ballance =

American marine scientist

Lisa T. Ballance
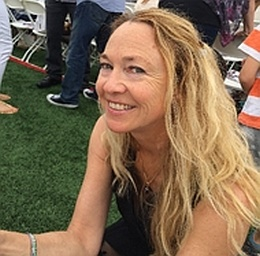
- Ballance in 2019
- Education: San Jose State University; University of California, Los Angeles
- Scientific career
- Workplaces: Oregon State University
- Thesis: Community ecology and flight energetics in tropical seabirds of the eastern Pacific : energetic correlates of guild structure (1993)

Lisa Taylor Ballance is an American marine scientist who is the Director of the Marine Mammal Institute and Endowed Chair for Marine Mammal Research at Oregon State University.

== Early life and education ==
Ballance studied biology as an undergraduate student at the University of California, San Diego. Ballance completed her master's studies in marine science at San Jose State University. Her research considered the ecology and behavior of the bottlenose dolphin. She moved to University of California, Los Angeles for her doctoral research, where she studied the ecology of tropical seabirds in the Eastern Pacific. During her doctorate she joined the Association for Women in Science. She was a postdoctoral researcher at the National Academies of Sciences, Engineering, and Medicine.

== Research and career ==
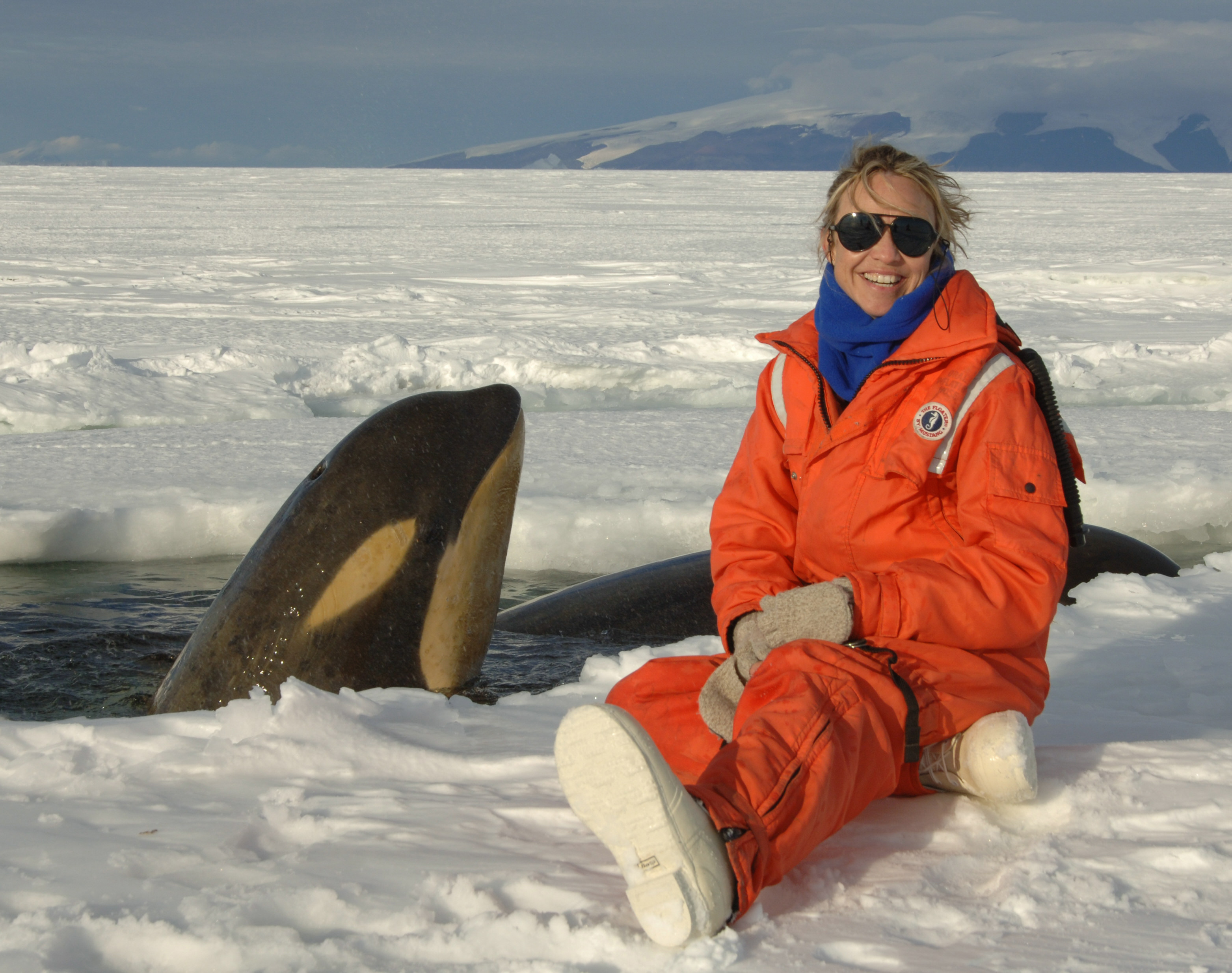
Ballance with killer whale calf in the southern Ross Sea, Antarctica, on a NOAA expedition in 2007

Ballance joined the National Oceanic and Atmospheric Administration (NOAA). Her research has focused on seabirds and cetaceans. She held various positions at the NOAA, including Chair of the Pacific Seabird Group, Lead of Cetacean Ecology and Chief of Stenella Abundance Research.

In 2013, Balance was appointed Chair of the NOAA Fisheries National Seabird Program. The overarching aim of the program was to mitigate bycatch (the unwanted fish caught by commercial fishing nets) and to promote seats as indicates of ecosystem health. She led the Eastern Tropical Pacific Research Program, which was responsible for the “Dolphin Safe” label found on canned tuna.

Ballance was made Professor of Fisheries and Wildlife and Director of the Marine Mammal Research Institute at Oregon State University in 2019. She led expeditions to see beaked whales and dolphins. She was awarded a $2 million grant to collect information about the distribution of marine mammals.

On July 23, 2024, President Joe Biden nominated Ballance to be a Member of the Marine Mammal Commission.

== Selected publications ==
- E., Redfern, J. V. Ferguson, M. C. Becker, E. A. Hyrenbach, K. D. Good, Caroline P. Barlow, J. Kaschner, K. Baumgartner, Mark F. Forney, K. A. Ballance, L. T. Fauchald, P. Halpin, Patrick N. Hamazaki, T. Pershing, A. J. Qian, Song S. Read, Andrew J. Reilly, S. B. Torres, L. Werner, Francisco (April 22, 2011). Techniques for cetacean–habitat modeling. Inter-Research. OCLC 719108343.
- Ballance, Lisa T.; Pitman, Robert L.; Fiedler, Paul C. (May 1, 2006). "Oceanographic influences on seabirds and cetaceans of the eastern tropical Pacific: A review". Progress in Oceanography. 69 (2–4): 360–390. Bibcode:2006PrOce..69..360B. doi:10.1016/j.pocean.2006.03.013. ISSN 0079-6611.
- Ballance, Lisa T.; Pitman, Robert L.; Reilly, Stephen B. (July 1, 1997). "Seabird Community Structure Along a Productivity Gradient: Importance of Competition and Energetic Constraint". Ecology. 78 (5): 1502–1518. doi:10.1890/0012-9658(1997)078[1502:scsaap]2.0.co;2. ISSN 0012-9658.
