= Simon Godsill =

British statistician (born 1965)

- Born: Simon John Godsill; 2 December 1965 (age 60)
- Education: University of Cambridge (MA 1988, PhD 1993)
- Scientific career
- Fields: Bayesian statistics; Digital signal processing; Particle filtering
- Workplaces: University of Cambridge
- Thesis: The Restoration of Degraded Audio Signals (1993)
- Doctoral advisor: Peter J. W. Rayner
- Website: sigproc.eng.cam.ac.uk/Main/SJG

Simon John Godsill (born 2 December 1965) is professor of statistical signal processing at the University of Cambridge, and a professorial fellow at Corpus Christi College. He is also a member of the Centre for Science and Policy. His main area of research is Bayesian statistics and stochastic sampling methodologies, particularly particle filtering.

== Education ==
Godsill attended Selwyn College, Cambridge, obtaining a first class degree in the Electrical and Information Sciences Tripos in 1988. He then went on to receive a Ph.D. degree from the Department of Engineering at Cambridge University in 1993, with a thesis entitled "The Restoration of Degraded Audio Signals" and his Ph.D. supervisor was Peter Rayner, whom he shared with Mike Lynch.

== Career ==
Godsill has published over 250 articles in peer reviewed journals, along with the books Digital audio restoration: a statistical model based approach and Compressed sensing & sparse filtering.

== Business interests ==
Godsill is currently a director of CEDAR Audio Ltd, a Cambridge-based company that applies Bayesian mathematics for purposes of noise reduction in audio data. In February 2005, the company received a Sci-Tech Academy Award (a 'Technical Oscar') for its services to the movie industry, and a stream of innovations appeared over the following years with corresponding recognition including induction into the Audio Technology Hall of Fame (2008), a Cinema Audio Society Award (2009). Godsill is also a director at Input Dynamics Ltd, a Cambridge-based company that applies Bayesian techniques to touch screen technology. Godsill is involved with the research effort at BMLL Technologies, a Cambridge spin-off working in the field of machine learning application in the financial sector.
