= Csap =

Csap or CSAP may refer to:

- Csap, Hungarian name for Chop, Ukraine
- CSaP, Centre for Science and Policy at the University of Cambridge
- CSAP or Colorado Student Assessment Program
- CSAP or Conseil Scolaire Acadien Provincial, the school board in Nova Scotia
