= Capricorn Seamount =

Seamount in the Pacific Ocean

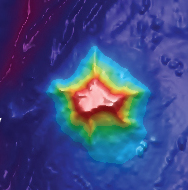
- Summit depth: 360 metres (1,180 ft)

Location
- Coordinates: 18°37.20′S 172°10.64′W

Capricorn Seamount is a seamount in Tonga. It rises 4 kilometres (2.5 mi) to a depth of about 360 m (1,180 ft) and is capped off by a 15 km (9.3 mi) wide summit platform. It appears to be a submerged volcano of Miocene age that may be part of a volcanic chain with Niue. Capricorn Seamount is located on the eastern flank of the Tonga Trench and is in the process of breaking up; in turn the trench has been altered by the interaction with the downgoing seamount.

== Geography, research history and name ==
The Capricorn Seamount lies 120 miles (190 km) east of Vava'u Island in Tonga and inside of Tonga's exclusive economic zone. First examined by the RV Horizon during the Capricorn Expedition of the Scripps Institution of Oceanography, it was successfully dredged in 1958 by the RNZFA Tui during the Pacific Cruise of the New Zealand Oceanographic Institute. It is also known as Capricorn guyot, Gora Kaprikorn and Capricorn tablemount.

== Geomorphology and geology ==
The large guyot rises over 4 kilometres (2.5 mi) from the eastern flank of the Tonga Trench to a depth of 360 metres (1,180 ft). It features a 15 kilometres (9.3 mi) wide flat top at 800–1,000 metres (2,600–3,300 ft) depth, which tilts gently westwards. A north-northeast trending scarp separates the flat top from another, shallower flat-topped knoll on the eastern side of the flat top which also tilts westwards; the shallowest point of the seamount lies on this knoll. Additional volcanic cones dot the slopes of Capricorn Seamount. At its foot the seamount is 100 kilometres (62 mi) wide. The crust underneath the seamount is 75-95 million years old and is thickened, perhaps by the seamount's lava flows.

A cap of limestones lies on Capricorn Seamount; its thickness is unknown. Dredging has yielded pelagic ooze containing abyssal clay, basaltic breccia, dark pumice, dead corals, fecal pellets, fossils of foraminifera, gastropods and pteropods, limestones with brown manganese dioxide encrustations, otoliths and sand. The foraminifera are of recent to Plio-Pleistocene age and the limestones formed in shallow water.

== Fisheries ==
Albacore, bigeye and yellowfin aggregate at the seamount, and fishing catch rates are much higher than in the open ocean. The seamount has been used for fishing for a long time.

== Origin, geologic history and present-day interaction with the Tonga Trench ==
Capricorn Seamount likely formed in the Miocene (23-5 million years ago) as a volcano, perhaps part of a hotspot track which also includes Niue. The volcano was later eroded until it received a flat summit surface, and eventually submerged. It is unclear whether it ever featured coral reefs as no evidence of such growth has been found although foraminifera data point to their past existence.

The seamount is about to enter the Tonga Trench and is breaking up in the process. It appears that the collision of the seamount with the trench has caused the formation of a fault linked to the "Fonualei discontinuity". The tilting of the summit platform was the first evidence of the existence of subduction processes. In about 500,000 years the top of the seamount will end up at the bottom of the trench. Capricorn Seamount is not the first seamount there to be subducted into the Tonga Trench, and previous subduction events may have deformed the trench. An earthquake (M_{w} 8.0) occurred in 1919 at the trench next to Capricorn Seamount and caused a tsunami; it might also have induced a submarine landslide on the seamount. Earthquakes occur underneath Capricorn Seamount where normal faults are apparent in the seafloor.
