= RV Horizon =

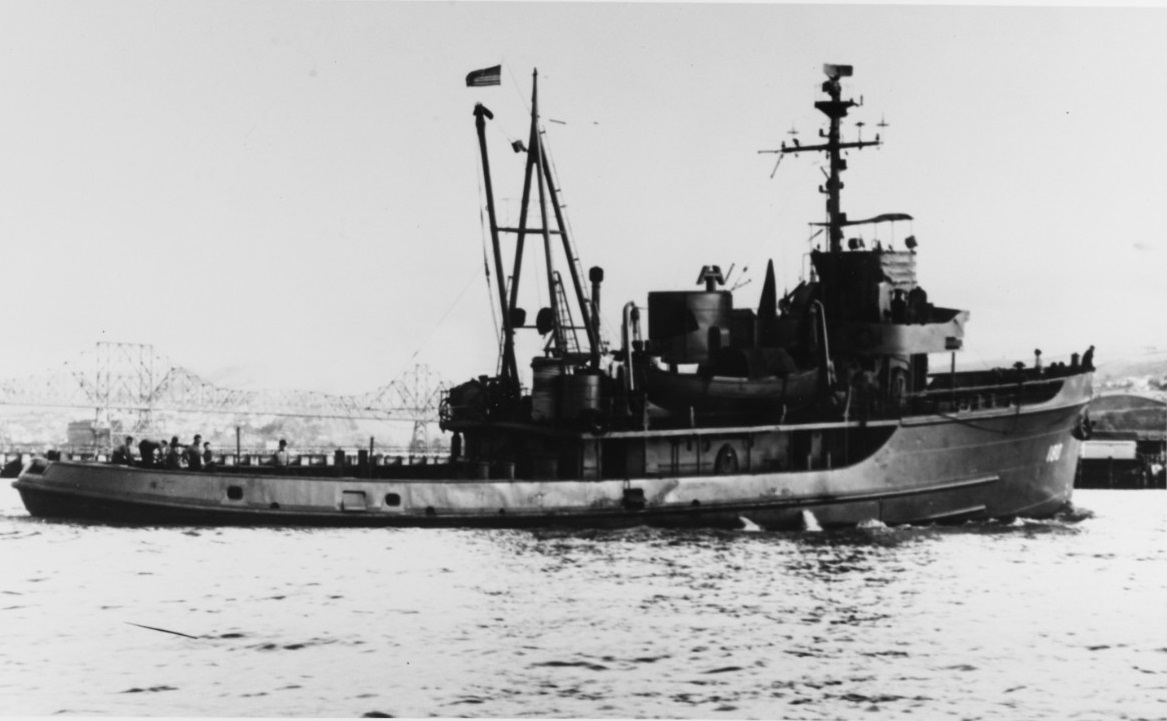
- USS ATA-180

History

United States
- Name: ATA-180
- Launched: 14 July 1944
- Commissioned: 27 September 1944
- Stricken: 1948
- Name: Horizon
- Owner: Scripps Institution of Oceanography
- Acquired: 1949
- Fate: Sold c.1968

General characteristics
- Tonnage: 505 GT
- Displacement: 835 t.(lt) 1,360 t.(fl)
- Length: 143 ft (44 m)
- Beam: 33 ft 10 in (10.31 m)
- Draft: 13 ft 2 in (4.01 m)
- Installed power: 2 × GM 12-278A Diesel-electric engines; Fairbanks Morse Main Reduction Gear
- Propulsion: Single screw 1,200 shp (890 kW)
- Speed: 12 knots (22 km/h; 14 mph)
- Range: 7,000 mi (11,000 km)
- Complement: 45
- Armament: 1 × 3"/50 dual-purpose gun mount; 2 × 20mm AA gun mounts

RV Horizon, ex Auxiliary Fleet Tug ATA-180, was a Scripps Institution of Oceanography research vessel from 1949 through 1968. During that time she made 267 cruises and logging 610,522 miles (982,540 km) spending 4,207 days at sea.

== Construction ==
ATA-180 was launched 14 July 1944, was commissioned 27 September 1944 and served in the Asiatic-Pacific Theater. She was laid up in the Pacific Reserve Fleet and stricken from the Naval Register in 1948.

== Service history ==
As a tug the ship had an obscure history, without an entry in the Dictionary of American Naval Fighting Ships and only the bare facts of her construction and deployment. The only mention of ATA-180 on the Naval History and Heritage Command web site is listing as part of Task Unit 1.2.7 (Salvage Unit) at Operation Crossroads.

The ship became notable in her second career as one of the trailblazing postwar oceanographic research vessels beginning with her conversion in 1949.

== Research career and significance ==
The ship was notable in the early days of national oceanography following World War II when small converted vessels began multiple expeditions for educational institutions, often under Navy sponsorship. Henry W. Menard notes "It is a rare senior oceanographer anywhere in the world who has not at least seen the ship" and compares her to the Soviet Vityaz and French Calypso active during the period.

Horizon made the first of Scripps' deep sea expeditions, a joint Scripps Institution of Oceanography-US Navy effort in 1950 given the name Midpac, during which it was discovered that the sea floor was young. This discovery changed the conception that the sea floor was old and sediment filled and was an early lead to the current Plate Tectonics theory The ship was engaged in Scripps' Capricorn Expedition jointly sponsored by the U.S. Navy and University of California, which included echo sounding, seismic and magnetic data collection, coring and heat flux measurement among other tasks. The ship developed a detailed description of the Capricorn Seamount on the eastern flank of the Tonga trench where lies the Horizon deep named for the vessel.

The ship's name is given to the Horizon Guyot (19°40′N 168°30′W), Horizon Deep (23°15.5′S 174°43.6′W), Horizon Channel (47°10′N 145°00′W), and the Horizon Bank (13°10′S 173°35′E). Horizon and Argo discovered and explored the Horizon Ridge (14°55′S 105°52′E – 14°00′S 106°45′E) during the 1962 Lusiad Expedition, a part of the International Indian Ocean Expedition (IIOE).
