= Robert Gordon Sproul =

American academic administrator (1891–1975)

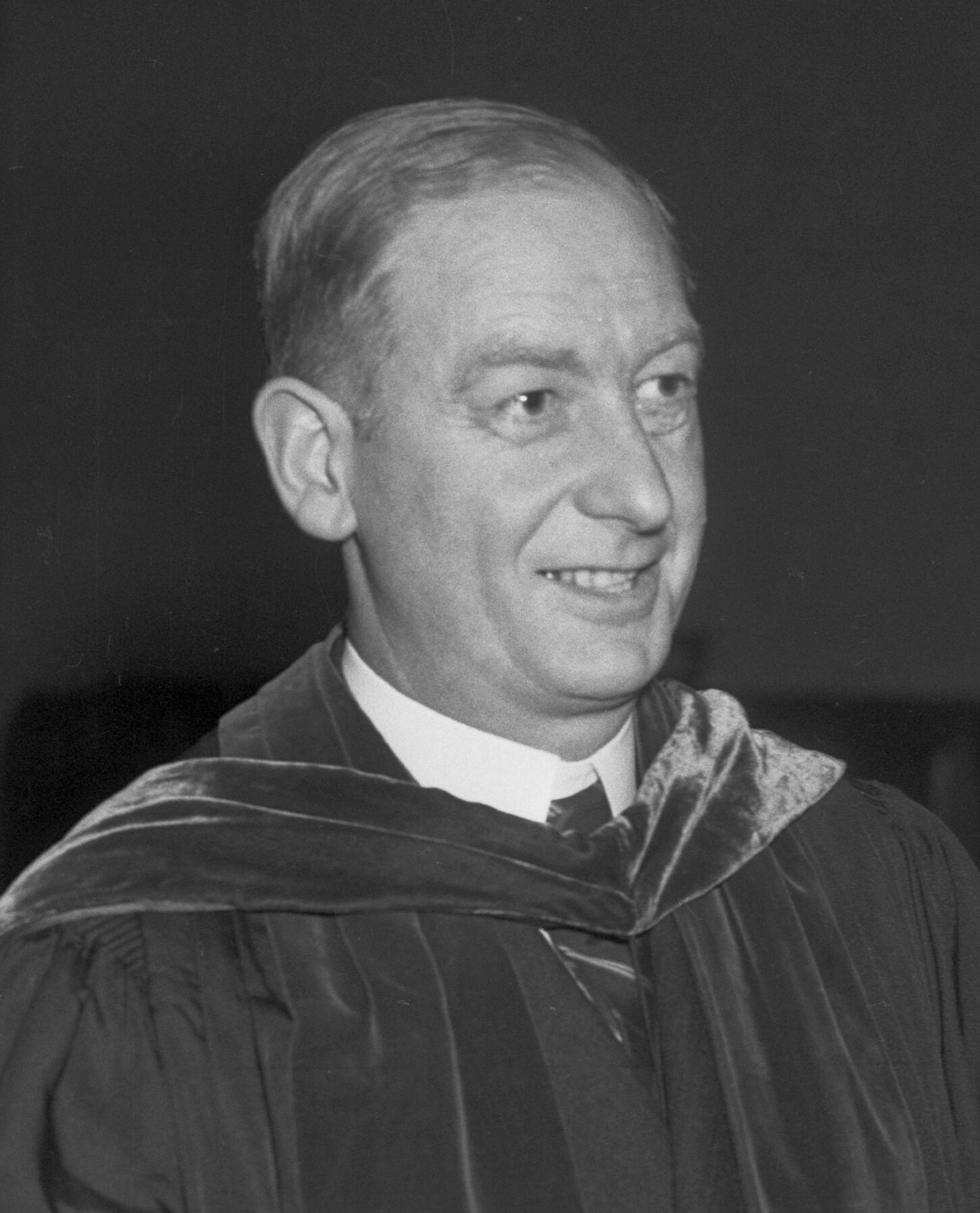
Sproul in 1936

Robert Gordon Sproul (/spraʊl/ SPROWL; May 22, 1891 – September 10, 1975) was the first systemwide president (1952–1958) of the University of California system, and the 11th president of the University of California, Berkeley, serving from 1930 to 1952.

== Background ==
Robert Gordon Sproul was born on May 22, 1891, in San Francisco, California, to Robert Sproul, an immigrant from Scotland, and Sarah Elizabeth Sproul, a native of New England. His younger brother, Allan Sproul, served as chairman of the Federal Reserve Bank of New York. In 1913, he earned a B.S. in engineering from the University of California, Berkeley, where his classmates included future Chief Justice of the United States Earl Warren.

== Career ==
In 1913, Sproul started his career briefly as an efficiency engineer in Oakland, California.

In 1914, he began a 44-year track by joining the University of California's business office as a cashier and rose to controller, legislative lobbyist, and by 1925 secretary of the regents and vice president of finance and business affairs.

In June 1929, Sproul was chosen as the eleventh president of the University of California. He immediately took a leave of absence to study other universities. In a 1930 speech, as president-elect he stated:

The glory of a university is obviously the men who constitute its faculty. It cannot be too often repeated that it is men, and nothing but men, who make education. The reason why the University of California occupies the high position it does throughout the academic world is that there has never been a time when its faculty could not boast of men who were finding their way along rough trails, illuminated only by the spark of genius, to the heights of scholarship. Within a few years after the receipt of its charter from the state, there were to be found in the University a goodly number of men whose reputation is even yet undimmed, such men as Daniel Coit Gilman, later president of Johns Hopkins University, Hilgard in agriculture, LeConte in geology, and many others. Nor is the present faculty devoid of men who, in their respective fields, hold high the lamp of learning--Campbell in astronomy, Kofoid in zoology, and G. N. Lewis in chemistry, to pick out a few of the most obvious. In a very real sense, such men are the University of California, and similarly elsewhere, for material development is futile without brains to use and to direct it and personality to irradiate it. Students are getting a gold brick if they go for education to a school where there are no great teachers.

He succeeded in maintaining the University of California school system as a Land Grant institution.

In 1936, Sproul added to his roles the job of provost of the University of California at Los Angeles through 1937. He organized the California Club that brought all campuses together. In 1944, he started an annual series of all-University faculty conferences.

During the Great Depression, expansion of facilities stopped. After World War II, he served on the Committee for the Marshall Plan.

In the 1930s, 1940s, and 1950s, he struggled with student dissent (e.g., over conscriptions) and McCarthy-style accusations from the newspapers controlled by William Randolph Hearst about "communist influence" on campuses. Perhaps the biggest controversy during his presidency came in 1949 over a special non-Communist oath required of faculty by the regents of the University of California, known as the "Year of the Oath." Forty professors who refused to sign were let go; a court restored their jobs in 1956.

Sproul's outstanding contribution during his 28-year administration was the multiple-campus expansion of the University to meet the demands for higher education in widely separated parts of the state while maintaining one institution governed by one board of regents and one president. He also stopped the establishment of separate local colleges in 1931, 1945, and 1953.

During the 1930s, Sproul also led the University's transformation into a research university. Sproul started to speak of UC's missions as "teaching, research, and public service", which remains true today.

California governor Earl Warren asked Sproul, his former classmate and fellow 1911 member of the University of California Band, to place his name in nomination for Vice President of the United States at the 1948 Republican National Convention in Philadelphia, Pennsylvania. In May 1951 he was appointed to the executive committee of the California branch of the Committee on the Present Danger.

Sproul retired in 1958. He became active in the Save the Redwoods League (after being a member since 1921) and in the East Bay Regional Park District and served on the National Park Advisory Board.

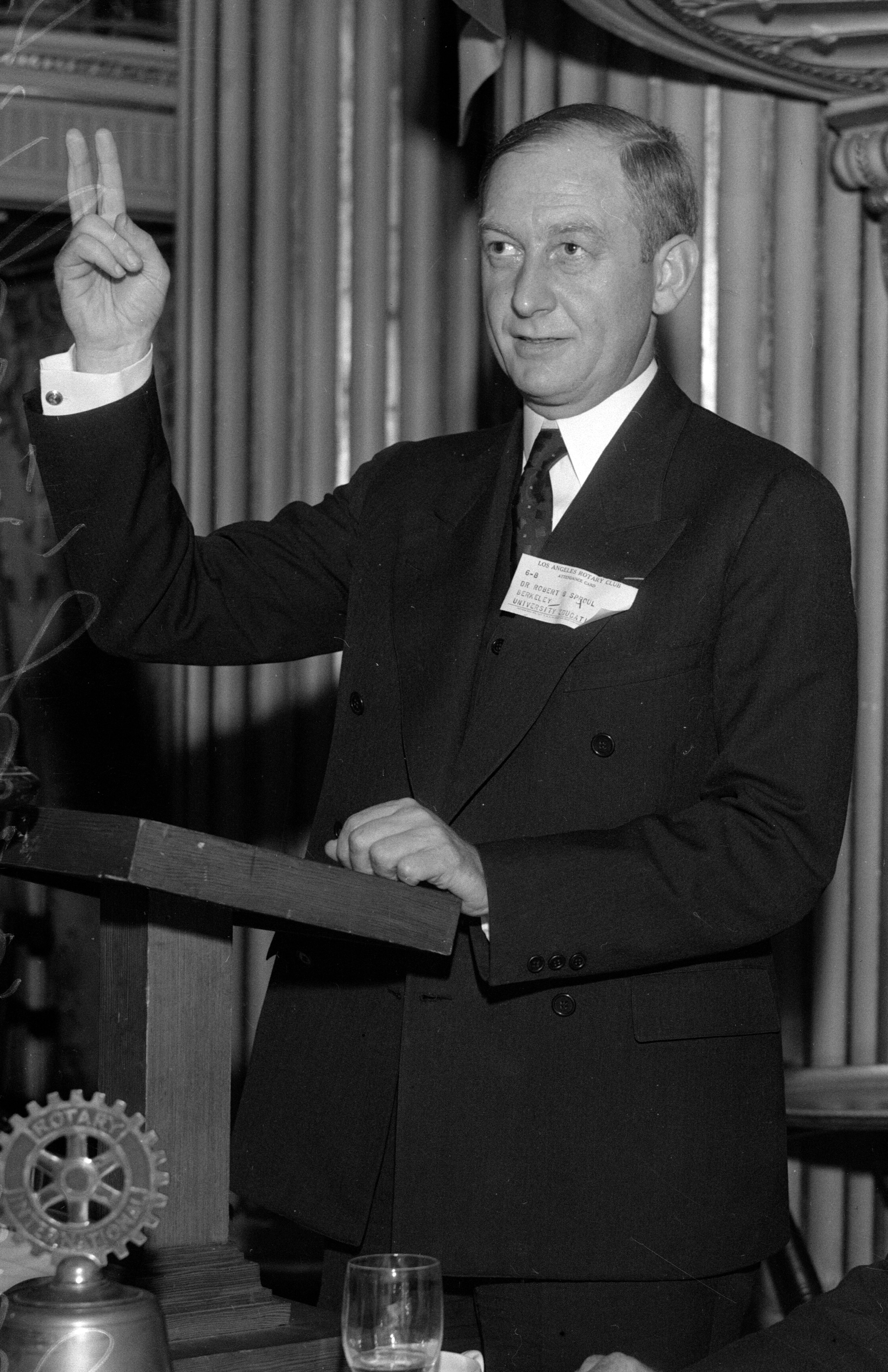
Sproul giving a speech, 1934

Before and during Sproul's presidency, the University of California's bureaucracy was highly centralized in Berkeley, but that was no longer politically viable by the time he retired. After 1900, the skyrocketing population of Southern California meant that Southern Californians were becoming the majority of everything—the state's population, then the state legislature, and then the Board of Regents—and they were fed up with long-distance micromanagement from Berkeley. UC Berkeley Chancellor Clark Kerr succeeded Sproul in 1958 with a clear mandate for change from the southern regents. Oddly, Kerr kept Sproul around as president emeritus and allowed him to sit on the committee which developed the actual plans for decentralizing the university's bureaucracy—that is, for dismantling the empire in Berkeley which Sproul had carefully protected for so many years. Sproul participated in the committee's meetings, but had enough dignity to know when he had been beaten fair and square. He put up no opposition and all committee votes were unanimous.

From Sproul's office as president emeritus, he gave a speech during the 1967 Free Speech Movement at Berkeley, by which he "contributed one of the few notes of humor in an otherwise grim confrontation." When student demonstrators broke into his office and scattered his papers, he told a reporter, "Nonsense. Nobody messed up my office. It always looks that way."

== Personal and death ==
On September 16, 1916, Sproul married Ida Wittschen. They had three children.

Sproul was inspired by predecessor Benjamin Ide Wheeler, who was president when he first began to work for the University of California.

Sproul was a member of Abracadabra (now Delta Chi Abracadabra), the Order of the Golden Bear, and the Bohemian Club - he sponsored Ernest Lawrence's membership in 1932.

He died age 84 on September 10, 1975, at home in Berkeley, California.

== Honors, awards ==
Honorary degrees:

- 1926: LLD from Occidental College
- 1930: LLD from University of Southern California
- 1930: LLD from University of San Francisco
- 1931: LLD from Pomona College
- 1932: LLD from University of Oregon
- 1935: LLD from University of Nebraska
- 1935: LLD from Yale University
- 1938: LLD from University of Maine
- 1938: LittD from Columbia University
- 1940: LLD from University of New Mexico
- 1940: LLD from Harvard University
- 1943: LLD from Mills College
- 1947: LLD from Princeton University
- 1949: LLD from Tulane University
- 1949: LLD from St. Mary's College
- 1958: LLD from University of California at Berkeley
- 1958: LHD from the University of California at Los Angeles
- 1958: LLD from University of British Columbia
- 1958: LLD from Rensselaer Polytechnic Institute
- 1959: LLD from Brigham Young University

Foreign honors:

- Officier de l'Ordre National de la Legion d'Honneur (France)
- Knight of the Order of the Iron Crown (Italy)
- Royal Order of the North Star - Commander Second Class (Sweden)

He was given the Benjamin Ide Wheeler distinguished citizen award by the city of Berkeley, 1933; made an honorary fellow of Stanford University, 1941; and named "Alumnus of the Year" by the California Alumni Association in 1946.

(All honors and awards listed come from the University of California History - Digital Archives.)

== Legacy ==
=== Achievements ===
At his death, the New York Times reported that the University of California owed its pre-eminence in science to Sproul, who transformed the school system from "a merely large institution" to "the biggest in the Western world... sprinkled with Nobel Prize winners." By the time he left office in 1958, the University of California, Berkeley, was a distinguished university recognized worldwide for the excellence of its programs and the University of California had a total of eight campuses from Davis to Los Angeles. Its student population had risen from 19,000 to 45,000 students. Its library had quadrupled to four million volumes. Its state support had risen nine times to $75 million.

Harvard University President James Bryan Conant and Columbia University President Nicholas Murray Butler said that Sproul was the university president of their time.

The Donahoe Act of 1960, although enacted after his retirement, helped fulfill his vision by integrating all higher education in California.

=== Buildings ===
Sproul Hall and Sproul Plaza on the University of California, Berkeley campus, site of numerous political rallies since the 1930s, are named for him.

At the University of California, Los Angeles campus, there are three residence halls named in his honor: Sproul Hall, Sproul Landing, and Sproul Cove.

Sproul Hall on the University of California, Riverside campus, home to the Department of Economics and the Graduate School of Education, is named for him.

At the University of California, Davis campus, Sproul Hall was once the tallest building in Yolo County.

=== Research ===
The research vessel R/V Robert Gordon Sproul, used by the Scripps Institution of Oceanography at University of California, San Diego is named after him. It has been in service to the University of California since 1984.

Academic offices
Preceded by William Wallace Campbell	President of the University of California; 1930–1958	Succeeded by Clark Kerr
