= Charles Kennel =

American scientist

Charles F. Kennel
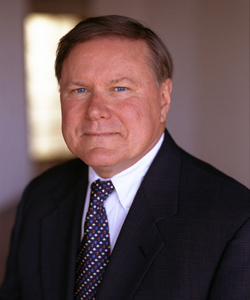
- Born: August 20, 1939 (age 86); Cambridge, Massachusetts
- Education: Harvard College (A.B.); Princeton University (Ph.D.)
- Awards: Guggenheim Fellowship (1987); James Clerk Maxwell Prize for Plasma Physics (1997)
- Scientific career
- Fields: Plasma physics
- Institutions: NASA, Scripps Institution of Oceanography, UCLA
- Thesis: Low-frequency stability of spatially non-uniform plasmas (1964)
- Doctoral advisor: Edward A. Frieman
- Doctoral students: Mary Hudson

Charles F. Kennel (born August 20, 1939) is an American plasma physicist and former Associate Administrator of NASA. He is an elected member of the National Academy of Sciences and won the James Clerk Maxwell Prize for Plasma Physics in 1997. In 2009, he was advertised by NASA Watch as a potential pick by Barack Obama as the next NASA Administrator.

== Early life and career ==
Kennel received a bachelor's degree in astronomy from Harvard College and a doctorate in astrophysical sciences from Princeton University. His doctoral thesis was advised by Edward A. Frieman.

Charles Kennel was a former Associate Administrator of NASA. He was the director of Mission to Planet Earth, a program during the Clinton Administration to perform a comprehensive survey and observation of our home planet. He was a member and chair of the NASA Advisory Council (NAC) Science Committee which he quit in 2006.

- Ninth Director of Scripps Institution of Oceanography
- Vice Chancellor of Marine Sciences at the University of California, San Diego, from 1998 to 2006.
- Member and chair of the NASA Advisory Council (1998–2006)
- Chair of the National Academy of Science's Space Studies Board
- In May 2009, Kennel was named a member of the Review of United States Human Space Flight Plans Committee an independent review requested by the Office of Science and Technology Policy (OSTP) on May 7, 2009.
- In January 2014, Kennel was elected the inaugural visiting research fellow at the Centre for Science and Policy (CSaP), University of Cambridge.

== Honors and awards ==
Kennel was awarded the Guggenheim Fellowship in 1987 and was inducted into the National Academy of Sciences in 1991. He was elected to the American Philosophical Society in 2003. In 1997, he received the James Clerk Maxwell Prize for Plasma Physics from the American Physical Society.

== Works ==
- Unstable growth of unducted whistlers propagating at an angle to the geomagnetic field – 1966 – Trieste : International Atomic Energy Agency, International Centre for Theoretical Physics
- What we have learned from the magnetosphere – 1974 – Los Angeles, Calif. : Plasma Physics Group, University of California, Los Angeles
- Matter in motion : the spirit and evolution of physics – 1977 – Charles F. Kennel and Ernest S. Abers – Boston : Allyn and Bacon
- Convection And Substorms: Paradigms Of Magnetospheric Phenomenology – 1996 – Oxford University Press, Usa – ISBN 0-19-508529-9
- The Climate Threat We Can Beat, in May/June 2012 Foreign Affairs with David G. Victor, Veerabhadran Ramanathan, and Kennel (website is paid while article is current)

Preceded by Edward A. Frieman	Director of Scripps Institution of Oceanography; 1998–2006	Succeeded by Tony Haymet
