= RV Robert Gordon Sproul =

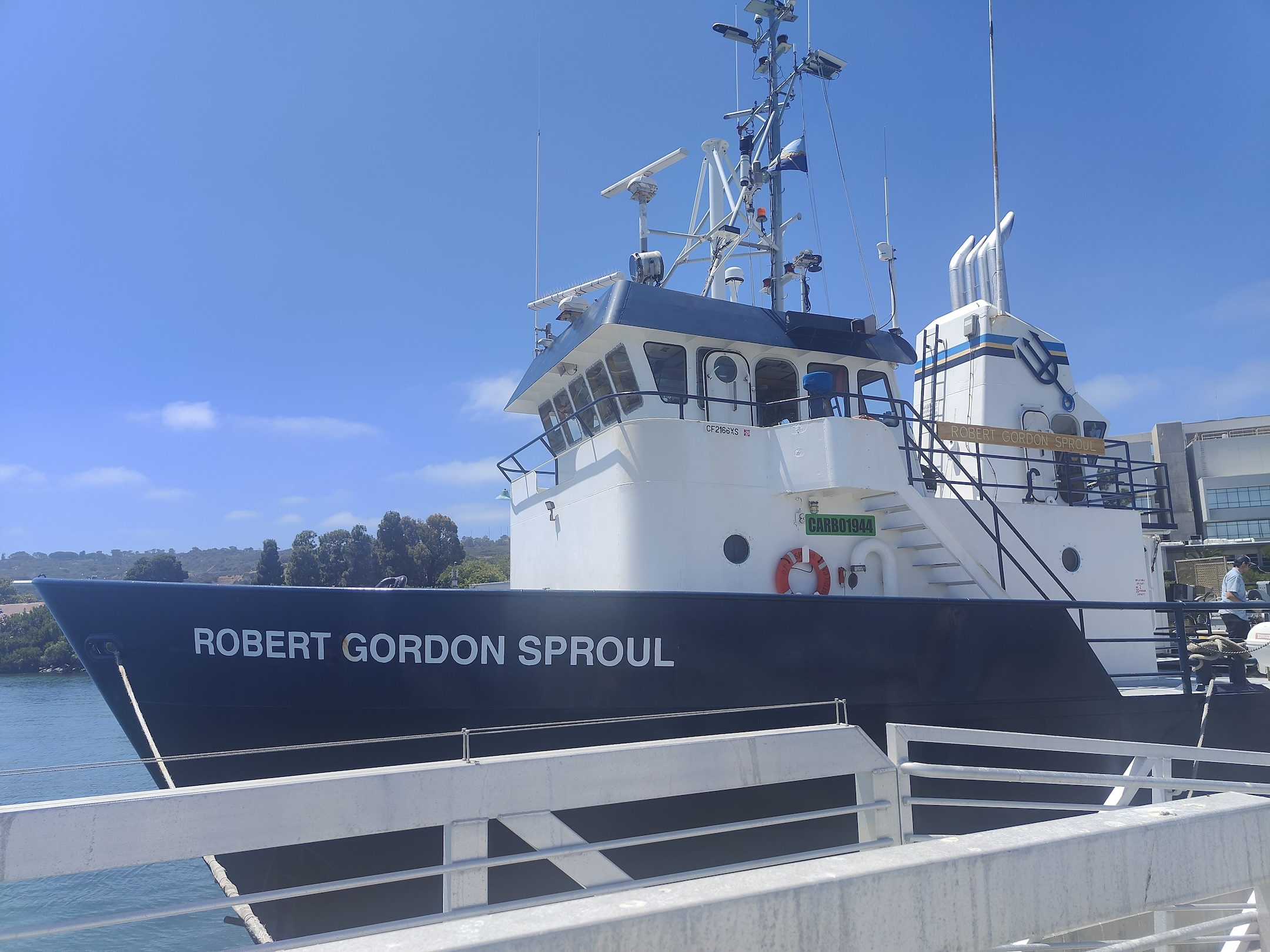
- RV Robert Gordon Sproul in Point Loma in 2024

History

United States
- Name: Robert Gordon Sproul
- Namesake: Robert Gordon Sproul, first president of the University of California
- Owner: Regents of the University of California
- Operator: Scripps Institution of Oceanography (SIO), University of California, San Diego
- Builder: Steiner Fabricators, Bayou La Batre, Alabama
- Launched: 1981
- Acquired: by SIO, 27 July 1984
- Renamed: 1984 from Midnight Alaskan
- Homeport: Point Loma, San Diego, California
- Identification: IMO number: 8128747; MMSI number: 303272000; Callsign: WSQ2674
- Status: Active

General characteristics
- Type: UNOLS coastal/local research vessel
- Tonnage: 85 GT
- Displacement: 696 long tons (707 t)
- Length: 125 ft (38.1 m)
- Beam: 32 ft 5 in (9.9 m)
- Draft: 9.5 ft (2.9 m)
- Decks: 3
- Propulsion: Dual fixed-pitch propellers 675 hp (503 kW) Detroit Diesel
- Speed: 8.5 knots (15.7 km/h; 9.8 mph)
- Range: 4,300 nmi (8,000 km; 4,900 mi) at 8.5 kn
- Endurance: 21 days (provisions); 14 days (fuel)
- Capacity: 340 sq ft (32 m^{2}) lab space; Provision for 1 20 ft (6.1 m) lab van; Fuel: 25,000 US gal (95,000 L)
- Crew: 5 civilian mariners; 12 scientific party

RV Robert Gordon Sproul, sometimes shortened to Sproul, is a research vessel operated by the Scripps Institution of Oceanography (SIO) as part of the University-National Oceanographic Laboratory System (UNOLS) fleet. The ship is named after Robert Gordon Sproul, the first system-wide president of the University of California.

== Construction ==
The RV Sproul was constructed in Bayou La Batre, Alabama by Steiner Fabricators in 1981 under the name of Midnight Alaskan. It was built using a modified gulf coast design for use by oil rig companies.

== Acquisition by Scripps ==
The vessel was purchased by Scripps director William Nierenberg on July 27, 1984, as a replacement for the outgoing RV E. B. Scripps. She was purchased from the chartering firm Midnight Boats, based in Louisiana, with SIO using the marine broker company Marcon International, Inc. After being purchased, she was renamed after Robert Gordon Sproul and underwent a number of modifications for increased scientific research along the Coast of California and Gulf of California.

She departed Louisiana in August and embarked on her first scientific cruise to study seals near the Yucatán Peninsula, then traveling through the Panama Canal and docking in San Diego in October 1984.

In 1991, then-captain Louis Zimm estimated the ship to be valuated at $3 million.

Between September 2014 and December 2015, Sproul completed all operations using 100% biofuel.
