= Easter Ellen Cupp =

American oceanographer (1904–1999)

Easter Cupp
- Born: March 30, 1904
- Died: August 27, 1999 (aged 95)
- Education: University of California
- Scientific career
- Thesis: A critical study of certain distinguishing characters in three closely allied plankton species of the diatom genus Nitzschia and their relationships to certain environmental conditions (1934)
- Doctoral advisor: W.E. Allen

Easter Ellen Cupp (March 30, 1904 – August 27, 1999) was the first woman to get a Ph.D. in oceanography from Scripps Institution of Oceanography. She is known for her work on diatoms.

== Early life ==
Cupp was born on March 30, 1904, which was the day Easter holiday is celebrated, in Neola, Iowa.

== Education ==
In 1910 she moved to Whittier, California where she would later attend college. Cupp received an undergraduate degree from Whittier College (1926), and in 1927 she moved to Berkeley where she received a master's degree from the University of California (1928). From 1929 until 1934 she worked as a research assistant at the Scripps Institution of Oceanography. In 1934 she earned her Ph.D. from Scripps Institution of Oceanography with her research on diatoms. Oceanography was a new degree at the time, and Cupp was one of only five people with a Ph.D. in oceanography at the time.

== Career ==
Cupp both conducted research at Scripps and taught classes in phytoplankton ecology with W.E. Allen who had been her graduate advisor. The director of Scripps, Harald Sverdrup, had positive reviews of Cupp's work, but in 1939 he fired Cupp because he decided her research did not match the research goals of the institution. Sverdrup replaced Cupp with Marston Sargent who had arrived at Scripps a year earlier. In later year's Cupp's status as the first woman to earn a Ph.D. from Scripps was forgotten by some, and Naomi Oreskes speculated in 2000 that some were uncomfortable with the firing of Cupp.

=== Later life ===
After Scripps, Cupp worked with the Navy from 1940 until 1943, and then became a teacher at Woodrow Wilson Middle School in City Heights, California. She retired from teaching in 1967.

Cupp died in 1999.

=== Research ===
Cupp is known for her research on diatoms, and she published a guide to diatoms found in the western United States, and other locations. She published works on different diatoms species she encountered in her investigations. Cupp was also known for her illustrations and collaborated with others on works requiring illustrations.

== Selected publications ==
- Cupp, Easter Ellen (1930). Spirotrichonympha polygyra sp. nov. from neotermes simplicicornis banks. University of California Press. OCLC 1080896485.
- Ellen., Cupp, Easter (1938). Plankton diatoms of the Gulf of California obtained by the G. Allan Hancock Pacific expedition of 1937. University of Southern California Press. OCLC 636742192.
- Cupp, Easter Ellen (1943). Marine plankton diatoms of the west coast of North America. University of California Press. OCLC 55992614.
