= Wynfred E. Allen =

American sports coach and biologist (1873–1947)

Biographical details
- Born: June 6, 1873; West Newton, Indiana, U.S.
- Died: September 20, 1947 (aged 74); Santa Paula, California, U.S.
- Education: Earlham (1898)

Playing career

Football
- 1894–1895: Springfield YMCA
- 1896–1897: Earlham

Basketball
- c. 1895: Springfield YMCA

Baseball
- c. 1895: Springfield YMCA
- Positions: Fullback, guard (football); Center (basketball)

Coaching career (HC unless noted)

Football
- 1896–1897: Earlham
- 1898: West Texas Military
- 1903: Lawrence
- 1904: Epworth
- 1905–1906: Kearney Normal

Basketball
- 1906–1907: Kearney Normal

Head coaching record
- Overall: 2–2 (college basketball)

Wynfred Emory Allen (June 6, 1873 – September 20, 1947) was an American football and basketball coach and biologist. He served as the head football coach at Earlham College in Richmond, Indiana from 1896 to 1897, Lawrence University in Appleton, Wisconsin in 1903, and Kearney State Normal School—now known as the University of Nebraska–Kearney–from 1905 to 1906. Allen was also the head basketball coach at Kearney State in 1906–07.

In 1910, Allen served as an assistant zoology professor at the University of Illinois at Urbana–Champaign, and from 1919 to 1943, he worked as a biologist at the Scripps Institution for Biological Research.

== Head coaching record ==
=== College football ===
Year	Team	Overall	Conference	Standing	Bowl/playoffs
Earlham Quakers (Independent) (1896–1897)
1896	Earlham	3–3			
1897	Earlham	2–4			
Lawrence:		5–7			
Lawrence Vikings (Independent) (1903)
1903	Lawrence	6–3			
Lawrence:		6–3			
Epworth Methodists (Independent) (1904)
1904	Epworth				
Epworth:					
Kearney Normal Antelopes (Independent) (1905–1906)
1905	Kearney Normal	0–5–1			
1906	Kearney Normal	3–4–2			
Kearney Normal:		3–9–3			
Total:					
