= Scripps Institution of Oceanography =

Center for ocean and Earth science research

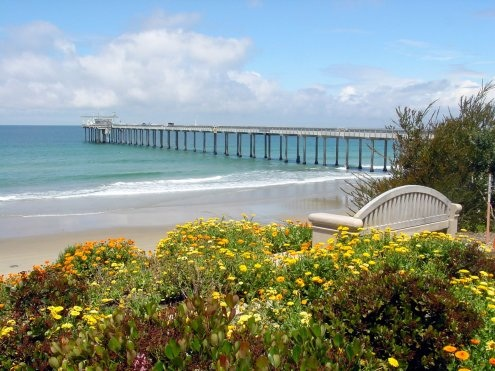
- Ellen Browning Scripps Memorial Pier
- Former name: Marine Biological Association of San Diego; Scripps Institution for Biological Research
- Established: 1903; 123 years ago
- Research type: Public
- Field of research: Oceanography
- Director: Meenakshi Wadhwa
- Faculty: 415
- Staff: 800
- Students: 350 postgraduates
- Location: San Diego, California, United States; 32.865437°N 117.253626°W
- Affiliations: University of California, San Diego
- Website: scripps.ucsd.edu

Scripps Institution of Oceanography (SIO) is the school of oceanography and earth science at the University of California, San Diego. Its main campus is located in La Jolla, with additional facilities in Point Loma.

Founded in 1903 and incorporated into the University of California system in 1912, the institution has since broadened its research focus to encompass the physics, chemistry, geology, biology, and climate of the Earth. The institution awards the Nierenberg Prize annually to recognize researchers with exceptional contributions to science in public interest.

== History ==
The original Scripps marine biological laboratory, 1910

=== Founding ===
Scripps Institution of Oceanography traces its beginnings back to William Ritter, a biologist originally from Wisconsin. In 1891, Ritter was offered a job teaching biology at the University of California, Berkeley, and married Mary Bennett. Their honeymoon and subsequent biological studies took them to San Diego, where Ritter met a local physician and naturalist, Fred Baker, who would later encourage him to build a marine biological laboratory in San Diego.

Ritter searched for eleven years for an appropriate place for a permanent marine biological laboratory. He spent summers at various places along the coast with students. His goal was frustrated by lack of money and lack of an appropriate place. During this time, research was being conducted at the boathouse of Hotel del Coronado on San Diego Bay.

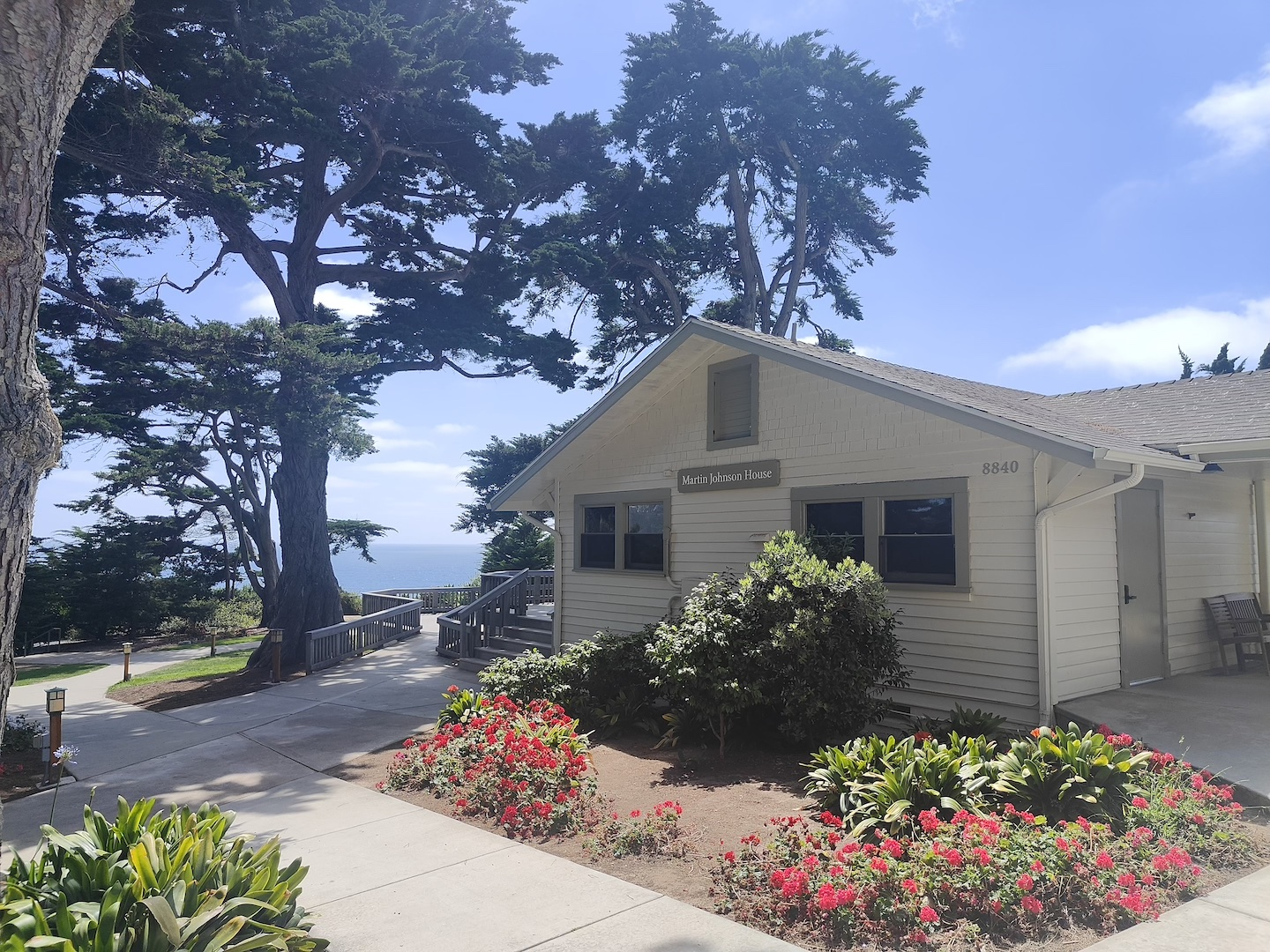
The Martin Johnson house, constructed in 1916

In 1903, Ritter was introduced to newspaper magnate E. W. Scripps. Together with Scripps' half-sister Ellen Browning Scripps and Baker, they formed the Marine Biological Association of San Diego with Ritter as the Scientific Director. They fully funded the institution for its first decade. E. W. Scripps gave the biological association the use of his yacht, the Loma, in 1904 and served as the first research vessel in the history of the institution. In 1905, they moved to a small laboratory in La Jolla Cove until they arranged for the purchase of a 170-acre (0.69 km^{2}) site in La Jolla, north of San Diego. The land was purchased for $1,000 at a public auction from the city of San Diego (the same site where the SIO main campus is today). However, construction cost estimates for a permanent building were around $50,000. Funding was secured through E. W. and E. B. Scripps, and the first permanent building (today known as the Old Scripps Building) was constructed in 1910.

The Marine Biological Association's first seafaring vessel, the Loma, ran aground in Point Loma in 1906 and prompted the search for a new one. With funds secured from Ellen Browning Scripps, the association was able to have a ship built by Lawrence Jensen strictly for oceanographic research—among the first for an American nongovernmental institution. The new vessel was acquired on April 21, 1907, and was named the Alexander Agassiz after the Harvard biologist who had visited in 1905. The 85-foot Alexander Agassiz, a sailing vessel with twin gasoline engines, served the institution for ten years.

In 1912, the Biological Association became incorporated into the University of California and was renamed the Scripps Institution for Biological Research.

The first iteration of Scripps Pier, along with other buildings, was approved for construction in 1913, but was only completed in 1916 due to delays related to World War I. In 1915, the first building devoted solely to an aquarium was built on the Scripps campus. The small, wooden structure contained 19 tanks ranging in size from 96 to 228 U.S. gallons (360 to 860 L). The oceanographic museum was located in a nearby building. Since the pier was completed in 1916, measurements have been taken daily. The modern Scripps Pier was built as a replacement for the 1916 structure in 1988.

The institution's name changed to Scripps Institution of Oceanography (SIO) in October 1925 to recognize the growing faculty's widened range of studies.

Easter Ellen Cupp was the first woman to earn a Ph.D. in oceanography from SIO in 1934, studying diatoms under Wynfred Allen. She stayed with Scripps until 1939.

In 1935, SIO director T. Wayland Vaughan became the first Scripps member to be awarded the Alexander Agassiz Medal by the National Academy of Sciences. Harald Sverdrup was awarded the medal 3 years later, beginning a long history of Scripps oceanographers being awarded the prize (Johnson in 1959, Revelle in 1963, and many more).

In November 1936, the research vessel Scripps was sunk when there was an explosion in the galley, killing the cook and injuring the captain. The sinking of the Scripps left SIO without a research vessel, so SIO director Sverdrup approached the UC president Robert Gordon Sproul and Bob Scripps (son of E.W and Ellen) to acquire a new one. They found Bob's pleasure yacht, Novia Del Mar, ill-fitting for the science roles performed by the Scripps, and purchased a different yacht from actor Lewis Stone in April 1937. The Serena was rechristened E. W. Scripps and was presented to SIO in December 1937. The E. W. Scripps would be quintessential for Sverdrup to build datasets supporting simple theories of ocean circulation, including the Sverdrup balance.

=== Wartime ===
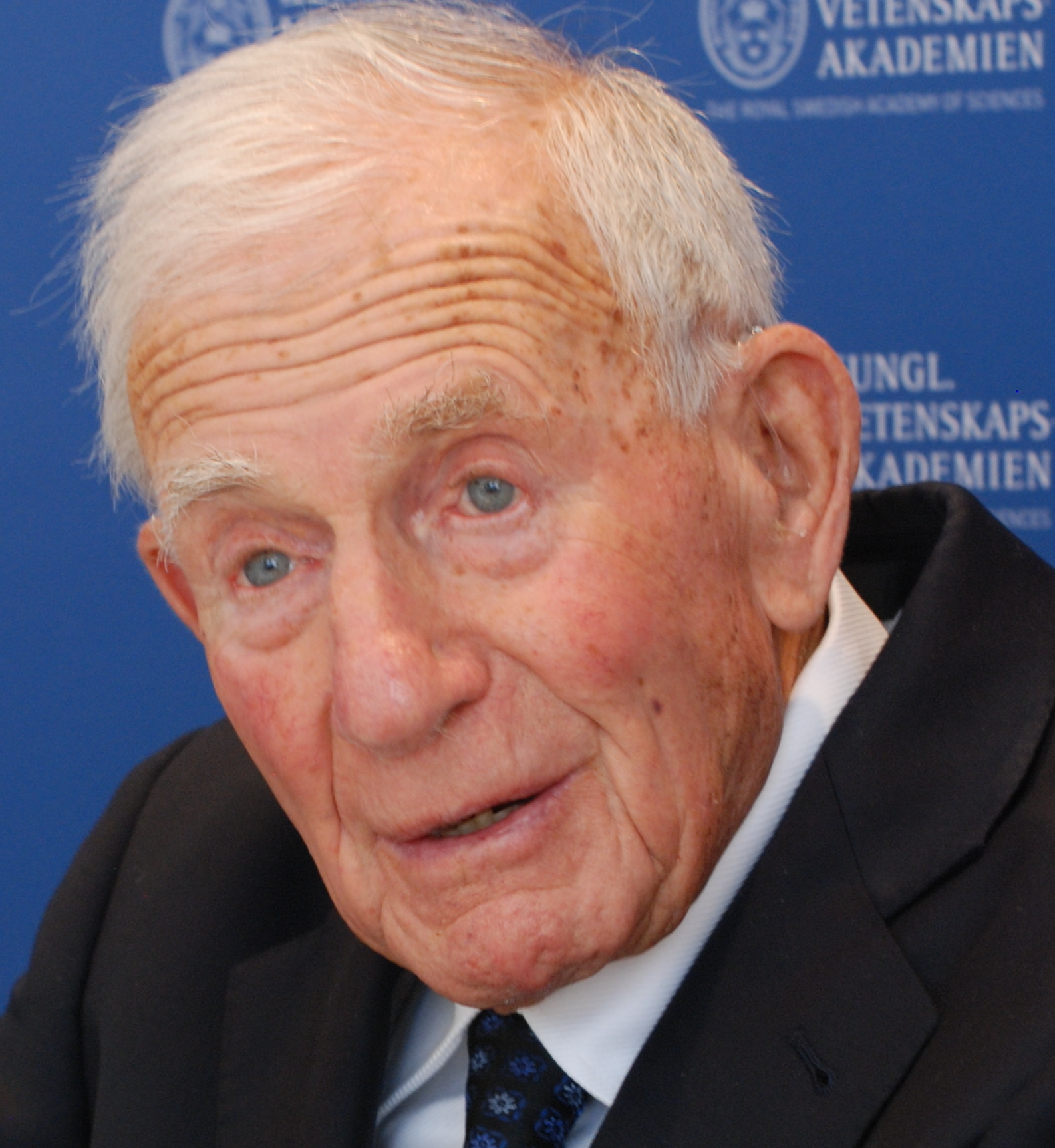
Harald Sverdrup and Walter Munk, oceanographers tasked with predicting surf conditions for allied amphibious landings

When World War II broke out Scripps created the University of California Division of War Research (UCDWR) in Point Loma, focusing on acoustics and waves to support the US Navy. Collaborative research between the UCDWR and the Navy led to the discovery of the deep scattering layer, a region from 300–500 m (980–1,640 ft) deep filled with organisms. The UCDWR would continue to research sound beacons and sonar until being absorbed into the Navy Electronics Laboratory and Scripps Marine Physical Laboratory between 1945 and 1948.

With Harald Sverdrup as the SIO director, recent graduate student Walter Munk was recalled from the army and together they were tasked with aiding Allied amphibious landings off the coast of Africa. The goal was to predict coastal surf and sea state for Allied landings in Africa, though their model was also applied to the Allied landings in Normandy, Sicily, and in the Pacific. SIO's UCDWR would train over 200 American and British military officers on swell forecasting techniques throughout the war. Though Sverdrup was initially intending on holding the position of SIO director for only 3 years until 1939, Nazi occupation of Norway prolonged his assumption of the role until 1948. Though Sverdrup's family became US citizens during the war, he struggled with Navy clearance which gave him an awkward relationship to the projects he was overseeing.

Wartime changed the funding dynamic for Scripps. Prior to the war, the only federal support for SIO came from the Navy seeking to protect the hulls of their ships. Threatened by German submarines, concepts within physical oceanography were researched for submarine warfare. By summer 1942, Roger Revelle was appointed as a Navy liaison for oceanography and the sonar head of the Navy Bureau of Ships. UCDWR research led to rapid development of bathythermographs, as well as the understanding of the thermocline and benthic sediments in the context of underwater warfare. Research on biofouling organisms were led by Dennis Fox and Claude ZoBell, with the goal to develop biological deterrents for seaplanes and vessels.

It was during 1942 that Sverdrup, along with Martin Johnson and Richard Fleming, completed the first comprehensive textbook of oceanography, The Oceans. The textbook was considered a first of its kind and of such military importance that it was forbidden from distribution outside of the United States.

SIO's first scientific diver was biologist Cheng Kwai Tseng, who used equipment to collect algae off the coast of San Diego in 1944. Tseng took red algae samples of Gelidium cartilagineum and cultured them to reduce the US dependence on Japanese agar, which was important to hospitals at the time.

=== The Golden Age of Oceanography ===
Following the war, Roger Revelle continued to act as a liaison for oceanographers and was consulted during Operation Crossroads in 1945. He noted significant difficulties during the project, stemming from the difficulty of civilian research to access naval research vessels and naval bureaucracy. To remedy this, Revelle championed joint research of the newly-established Office of Naval Research (ONR), the US Hydrographic Office, and Navy Bureau of Ships and Scripps was receiving around $900,000 annually from federal funding.

The Navy bestowed the operation of a number of vessels to SIO ushering in a "Golden Age" of oceanographic research and discoveries. Between 1947 and 1949 three post-war vessels were acquired and modified for scientific research: The Crest, Paolina-T, and Horizon. These vessels, combined with the overlap of expertise from the ONR in 1946, provided additional resources for ocean exploration. The three new vessels were put to work on the new Marine Life Research Program in 1950 (now CalCOFI), which sought to investigate the collapse of the California sardine population. In doing so, approximately 670,000 square miles (1,700,000 km^{2}) of ocean would need to be surveyed.

When Aqua-Lung was made available in the US in 1948, UCLA graduates Conrad Limbaugh and Andy Rechnitzer were able to convince Boyd W. Walker, their marine biology advisor at the time, to purchase one. Together, they introduced the Aqua-Lung to SIO in 1950 (with Limbaugh studying under Carl Hubbs) and began the Scripps Diving Program. Roger Revelle took over the director role at SIO in 1951 from Carl Eckart and, following a diving fatality at La Jolla in 1950, requested that Limbaugh develop a scuba training program for SIO, which debuted in 1951 and was heavily influenced by practices of the US Navy's Underwater Demolition Team. It was also during this time that Hugh Bradner, a physicist at UC Berkeley, became an advisor at SIO and developed the wetsuit in 1952. Bradner would go on to become a professor at SIO's Institute of Geophysics and Planetary Physics in 1961. The SIO Diving Program would continue to innovate and expand up to more than 160 affiliated divers in 2015.

The Vaughan Aquarium-Museum opened at the University's Charter Day in March 1951 to replace the prior aquarium, which had been in a consistent state of disrepair since at least 1925. Named to honor former institution director T. Wayland Vaughan, museum curator Percy S. Barnhart planned a replacement up until his retirement in 1946, passing the project along to Sam Hinton. Hinton would go on to collect specimens aboard the E. W. Scripps until the building was completed and occupied in 1950. While nearly three times the size of the previous aquarium, the building also housed the director's offices on the second floor and the preserved specimens in the basement. The seawater supply from Scripps Pier was renovated in 1964 to increase capacity and improve filtration.

In 1959, an additional administration building was constructed next to the original 1910 building, named the "New Scripps" building. Campus construction expanded with the completion of the Sumner Auditorium and Sverdrup Hall in 1960.

Scripps Institution of Oceanography director Revelle spearheaded the formation of the University of California, San Diego in 1960 on a bluff overlooking the Scripps Institution, with SIO acting as the nucleus. It was during the 1960s that SIO led the development of the Deep-Tow system, with oceanographer Fred Spiess as the lead of the Marine Physical Laboratory. The purpose was to map the oceans, most notably being used in Project FAMOUS between 1971 and 1974.

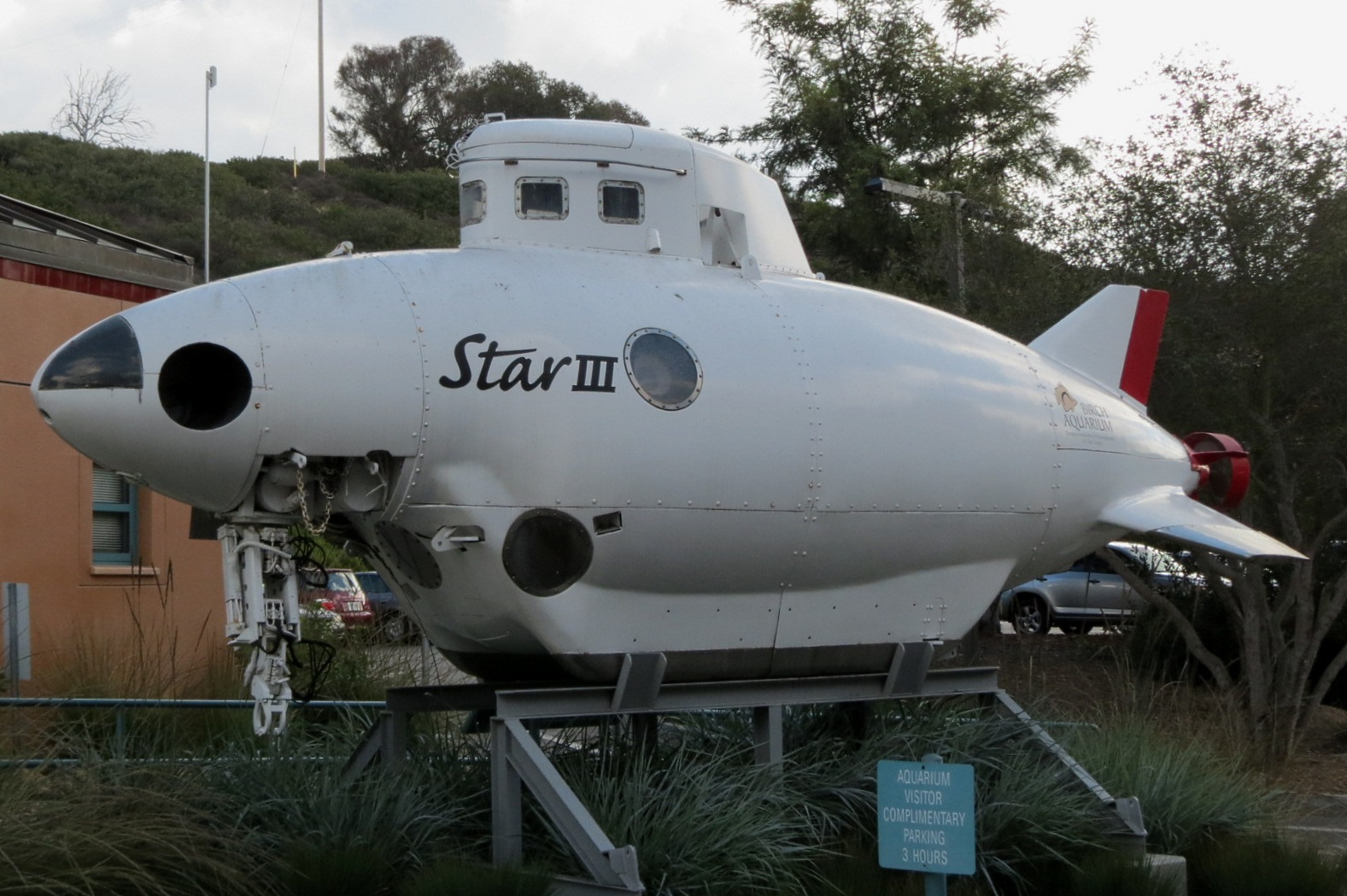
The Star III research submersible on display at Birch Aquarium

In 1965, Scripps began leasing 6 acres (2.4 ha) of land in Point Loma to tie up research vessels, including the RP Flip (launched in 1962), from the US Navy. The navy gave this land to Scripps in 1975 and the facility was named the Nimitz Marine Facility (or MarFac) after Chester Nimitz.

Also in 1965, Scripps assisted the Navy with the SEALAB project, where divers dwelled in a submersible habitat at 205 ft (62 m) in the nearby Scripps Canyon for 15 days at a time.

In 1968, Scripps researcher Harmon Craig met with Henry Stommel and Wallace Broecker to discuss one of the first geochemical research programs, which would eventually become GEOSECS. The Scripps-directed GEOSECS program would go on to become a major domestic and international collaborative research effort from 1972-1980, laying the groundwork for numerous repeat hydrography programs to follow.

On October 25, 1973, California Sea Grant became a college (National Sea Grant College Program) administered by Scripps Institution of Oceanography at the University of California, San Diego.

From March to May of 1979, SIO directed the RISE project and oversaw the 1979 discovery of black smoker hydrothermal vents at the East Pacific Rise.

=== International projects and modern history ===
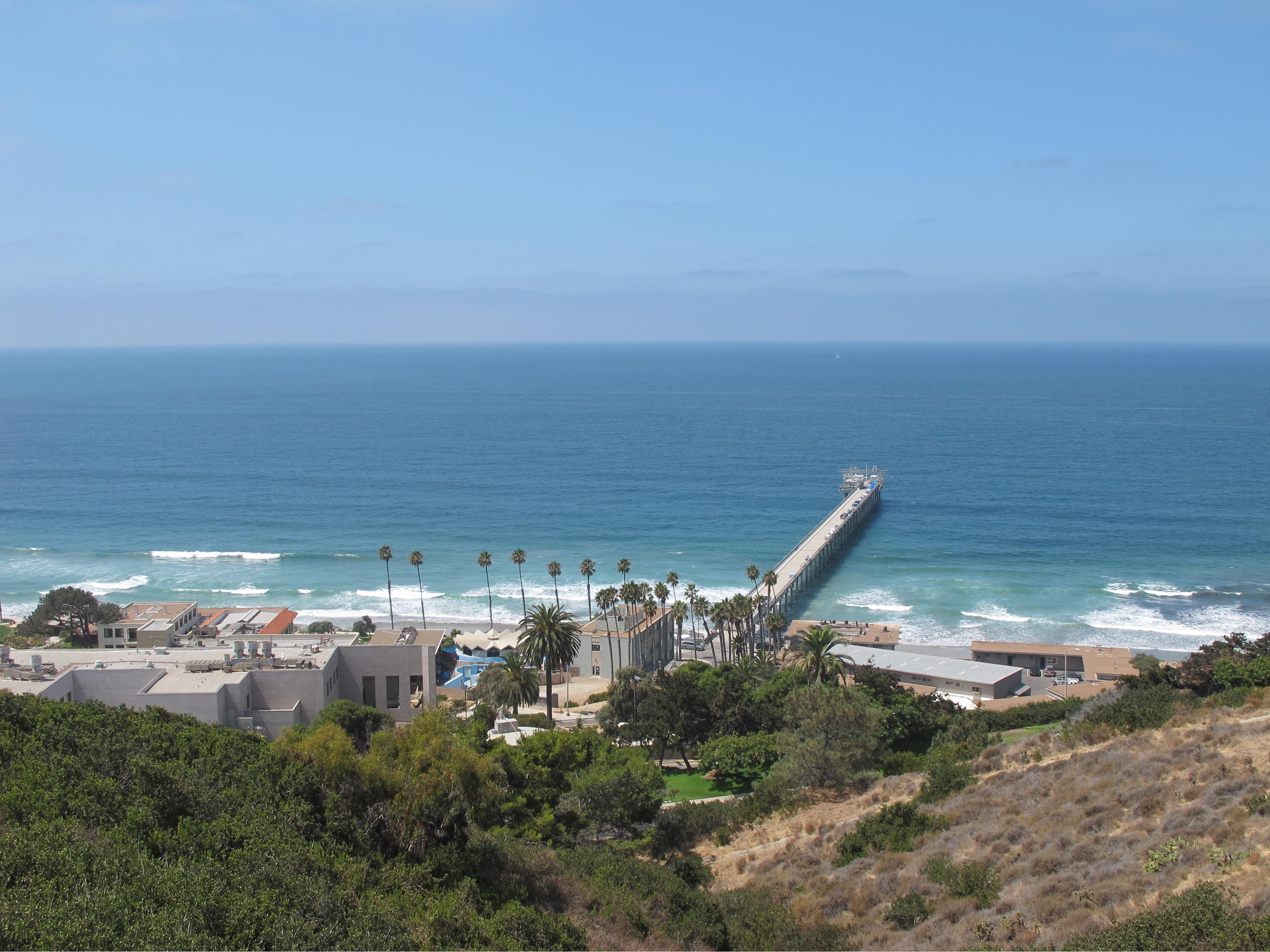
A view of Scripps Institution of Oceanography in 2011, taken from Birch Aquarium

The Old Scripps Building, designed by Irving Gill, was declared a National Historic Landmark in 1982. Architect Barton Myers designed the current Scripps Building for the Institution of Oceanography in 1998.

In 1998, Scripps director Charles Kennel and former director William Nierenberg approached Jesse Ausubel to discuss the formation and funding for an international consortium of oceanographic institutions. Together with John Shepherd, a proposal was made for the Partnership for Observation of the Global Ocean (or POGO), which held its first meeting in 1999 in Paris.

In 2007, the family and wife of late Roger Revelle donated 2.5 million dollars toward the Roger Revelle Chair endowed position, which Shang-Ping Xie now holds.

In 2014, SIO received a grant from the US Department of Transportation to test the use of biofuels on one of its ships, the Robert Gordon Sproul. The vessel operated from September 2014 to December 2015 on 100% biofuels which reduced nitrous oxide emissions, but increased particle emissions. However, the fuel source provided a proof of concept that research operations could be completed using biofuels rather than conventional diesel.

Also, 2014 was the first year of cruises for the international GO-SHIP program, a repeat hydrography program focusing on straight transects across major ocean basins and a follow-up to the World Ocean Circulation Experiment, which ran until 2002. Scripps, along with NOAA as the sole American members of the science committee, has overseen and advised many expeditions to contribute to the global data set.

In 2019, Scripps received $1.2 million of philanthropic funding for a 42-foot (13 m) research vessel, named after John Beyster and his wife Betty. Though the vessel was secured in spring of 2019, plans for the vessel's acquisition began in 2017.

From January to May of 2019, SIO directed a study at Imperial Beach to collect samples of sewage pollution from the Tijuana River and found elevated levels of harmful bacteria and aerosols. In 2024, Scripps was added to a task force including researchers from San Diego State University and regional doctors to better understand health impacts from the pollution. While collecting samples later in 2024, the task force had to evacuate the area due to elevated levels of toxic gases.

A campus report was published in 2022 describing campus lab, office, and storage spaces and found that women make up 26% of research scientists at SIO, yet occupy 17% of the space. The report highlighted that emeritus faculty on campus are 86% male and hold nearly 25% of all space at SIO.

==== 2023 graduate protests ====
In May 2023, the Scripps campus in La Jolla opened the Ted and Jean Scripps Marine Conservation and Technology Facility. The building required the razing of three older buildings originally constructed in 1963 and reinforcing of the nearby hillside in 2014. A month later, the building was vandalized in a protest against low graduate student wages. In June 2023, two SIO students and one recent graduate were arrested at their homes by University of California Police and held in custody overnight. The University alleged $12,000 in damages related to this incident. Union leadership in UAW 2865 and 5810, the local union chapters representing the arrested workers, accuse the University of California of retaliation and reneging on the contracts signed at the conclusion of the 2022 UC academic workers' strike. On July 10, 2023, hundreds of protesters gathered at San Diego's Central Courthouse to protest the arrests; however, in a written statement the San Diego District Attorney's office said the arraignment would not move forward because the case had not been submitted to its office for review. However, university officials have up to three years to file charges. On July 18, 2023, UCPD obtained a warrant and searched a fourth student's house for evidence of chalk or union affiliation in relation to the May 30 incident.

== Campus ==
=== Main campus ===
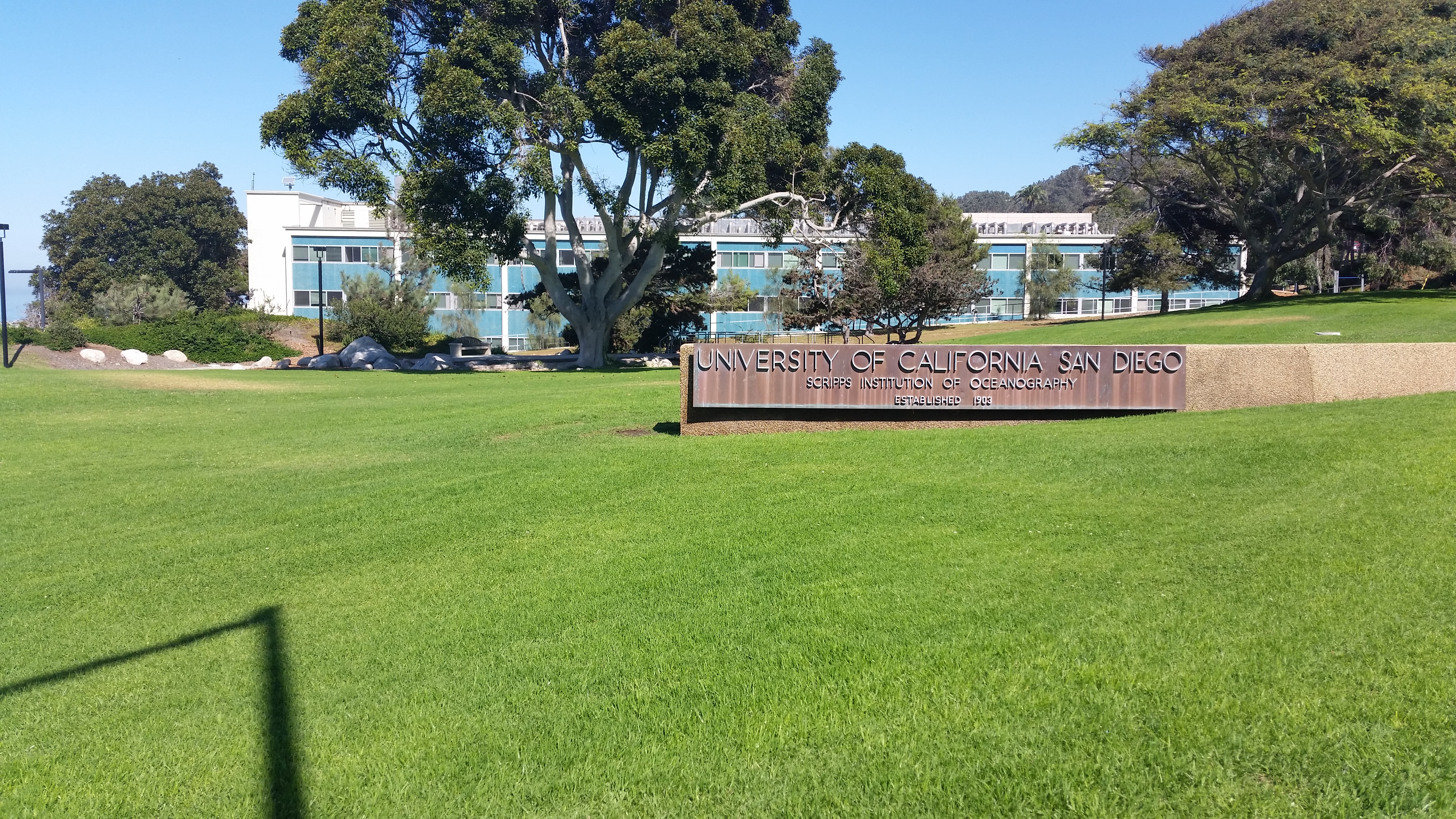
The entry to Scripps campus along La Jolla Shores Drive

The SIO main campus is located in La Jolla, situated between La Jolla Shores and Black's Beach. La Jolla Shores Drive provides access to greater La Jolla to the south, while continuing north through campus to the main UC San Diego campus.

Mass transit service to the main campus is handled by MTS line 30 (coming every 15 minutes) and UC San Diego's SIO bus route (every 10 minutes). Route 30 has stops exclusively on La Jolla Shores Drive, heading north to UTC Transit Center and south to Old Town Transit Center. The SIO route offers more comprehensive coverage of campus grounds, starting in Pawka Green, then La Jolla Shores Drive, Shellback Way, Birch Aquarium, and then north to Gilman Transit Center at UCSD's main campus.

Three sites on campus (the Seaside Forum, the Martin Johnson House, and Birch Aquarium) are available to the general public for rental.

==== Biological Grade ====
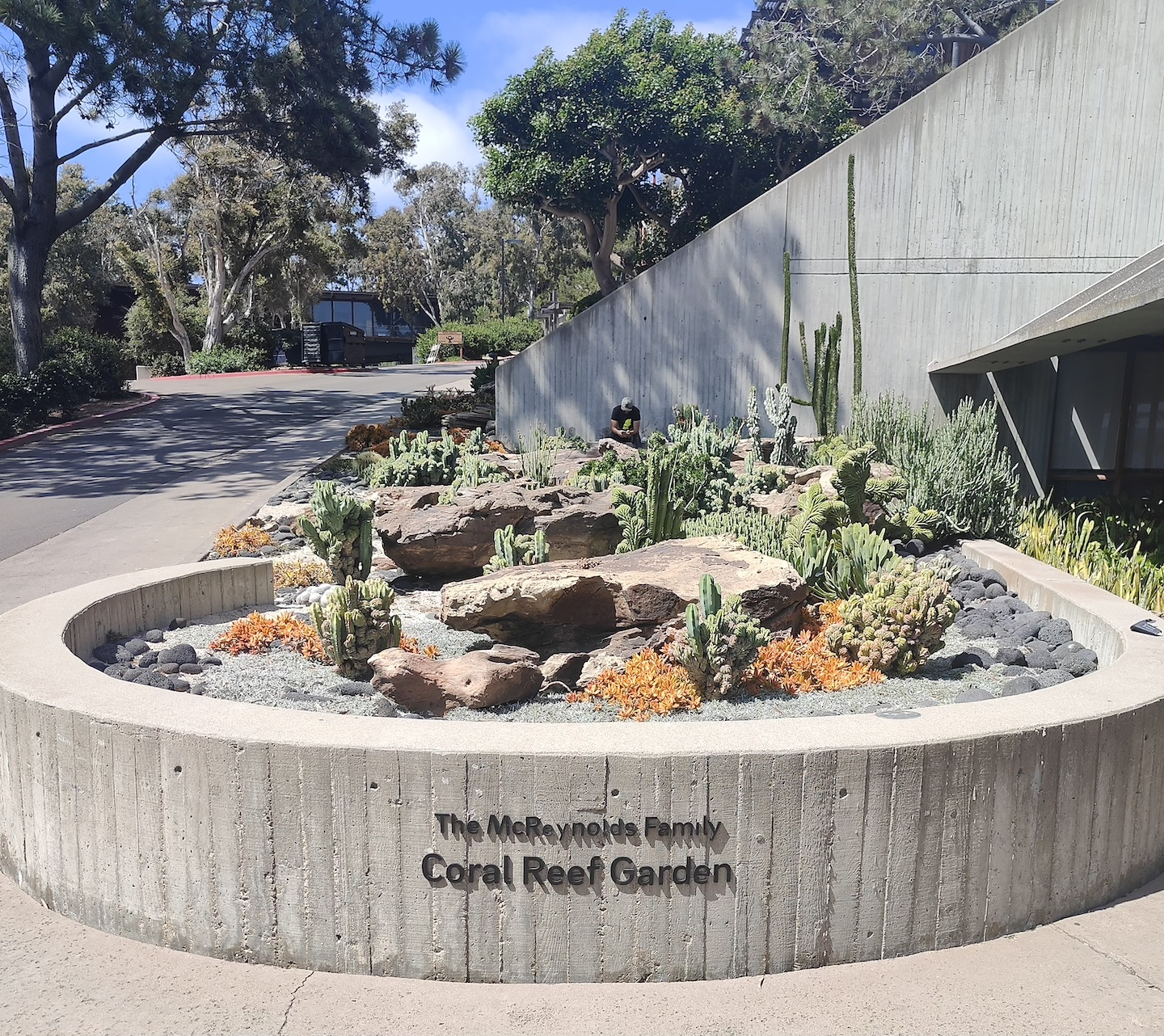
The Scripps Reef Garden on Biological Grade, finished in 2019

Biological Grade is the street running North to South parallel to La Jolla Shores drive, connecting a number of laboratories, libraries, and research halls. It was built between 1910 and 1912 with the original Old Scripps Building and was part of the main highway between San Diego and Los Angeles. As the campus grew, La Jolla Shores Drive was constructed to reroute through traffic for automobiles. Biological Grade connects to Shellback Way on the other side of La Jolla Shores Drive via the La Jolla Shores Pedestrian Bridge (also known as Scripps Crossing), erected in 1993.

The Scripps Coastal Meander trail (part of the California Coastal Trail) starts at the northern end of Biological Grade and connects to other trails, eventually terminating at Black's Beach.

In order from South to North	Year Completed	Notes
Center for Coastal Studies	1962, 1973	
Hubbs Hall	1977	Carl Hubbs
Eckart Building and Scripps library	1975	Carl Eckart
Munk Lab	1964	Judith and Walter Munk
Revelle Laboratory	1993	Roger and Ellen Revelle
Hydraulics Laboratory	1974	Contains a maker space
Martin Johnson House and Scripps Cottages	1916	
Isaacs Hall	1974	John Dove Isaacs III
MESOM	2013	
Marine Conservation and Technology Facility	2023	Ted and Jean Scripps

==== Pawka Green and Naga Way ====
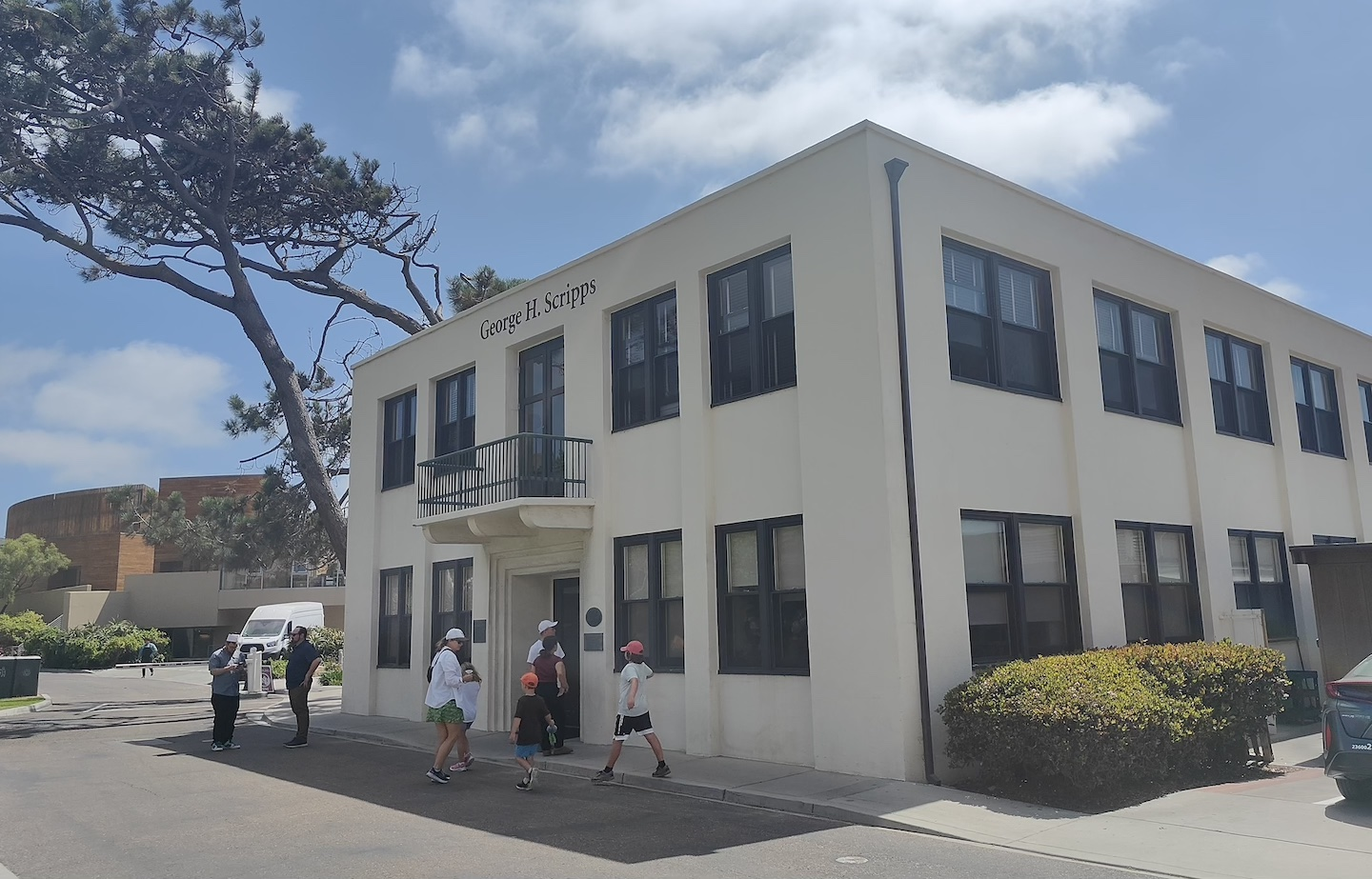
The Old Scripps building, facing Pawka Green

South of Biological Grade is the Pawka Green, named after Steven Pawka. The bordering Naga Way separates the labs from Biological Grade from the halls around Pawka Green, which are more oriented towards administration and instruction. The Naga Way street is named after the Naga Expedition, which took place in 1959 studying the Gulf of Thailand and South China Sea.

In order from South to North	Year Completed	Notes
Scripps Seaside Forum	2009	Robert Paine Scripps
Sverdrup Hall and Sumner Auditorium	1960	Sverdrup and Francis Bertody Sumner
Director's Office		
Old Scripps	1910	
New Scripps	1959	
Vaughan Hall	1999	T.W. Vaughan
Ritter Hall	1931, 1956	William Ritter
Kaplan Lab and Aquarium	1568, 1965	Charmaine and Maurice Kaplan
Scholander Hall	1965	Per Fredrik Scholander
Old Director's House	1917	

==== Shellback Way ====
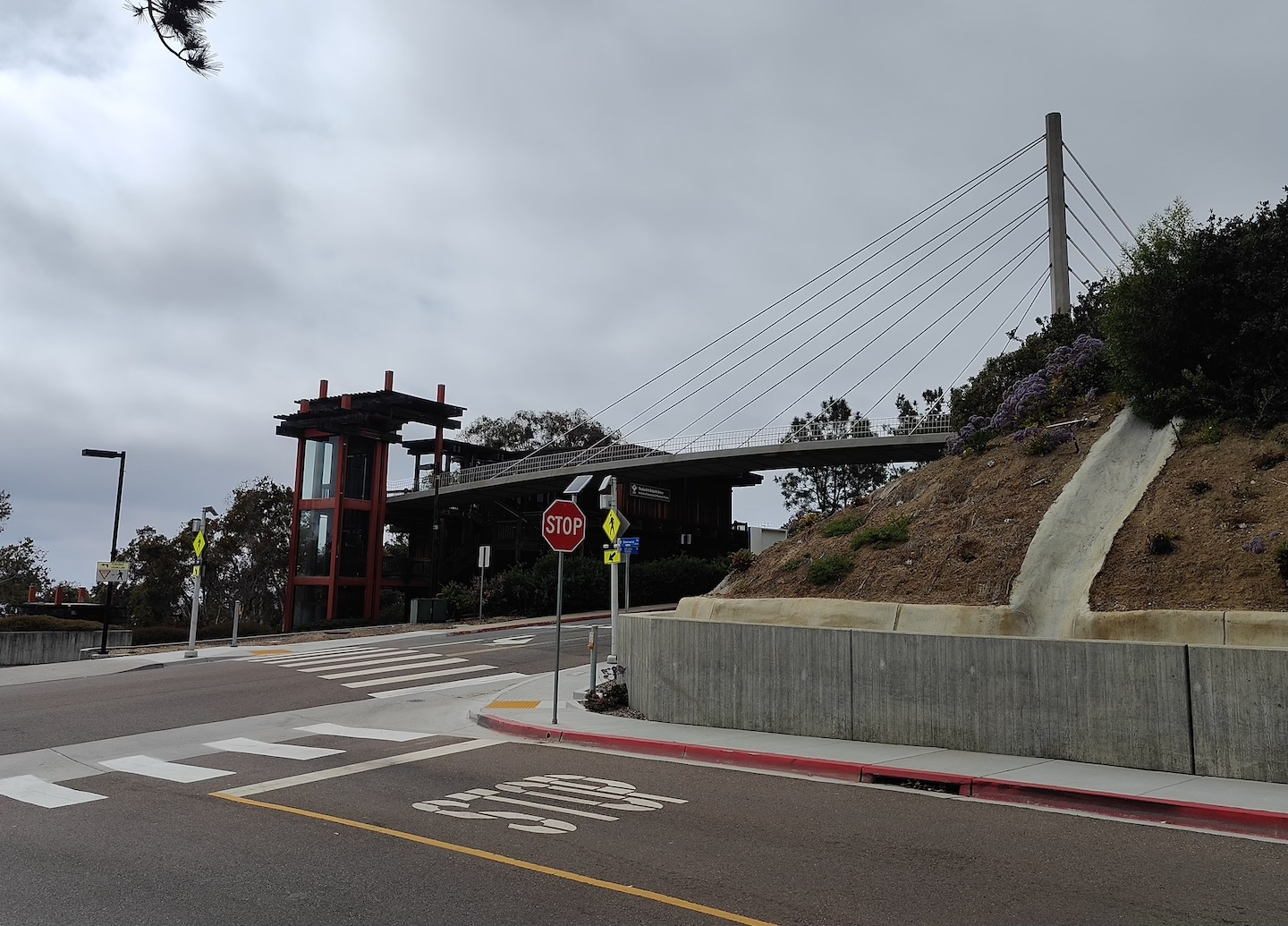
The Scripps Crossing bridge

Shellback Way connects a series of halls and labs on the east side of La Jolla Shores Drive, with greater emphasis on atmospheric science and fisheries. It connects to Biological Grade via the La Jolla Shores Pedestrian Bridge. Shellback Way is named after the Shellback Expedition which studied the deep Pacific off the coast of Peru, running from May to August 1952.

In order from South to North	Year Completed	Notes
Nierenberg Hall	1984	William Nierenberg
Spiess Hall	1984	Fred Spiess
W.M. Keck Center	1999	W.M. Keck Foundation
NOAA Southwest Fisheries Science Center	2013	

==== Downwind Way ====
Downwind Way connects La Jolla Shores Drive to Expedition Way, providing access to the rest of UCSD. This section of campus includes campus storage and facilities, Birch Aquarium, and Deep Sea Drilling Program. It is named after the first of three International Geophisical Year cruises, taking place from October 1957 to February 1958.

In order from South to North	Year Completed	Notes
Seaweed Canyon (Nori, Rockweed, Limu, Kelp, Eelgrass, Corallina)	1942, 2014	Storage
Birch Aquarium and Parking Lot	1992	Stephen and Mary Birch Foundation
Deep Sea Drilling	1969, 1972	

==== Campus flora and fauna ====
The main campus in La Jolla is situated next to the San Diego-Scripps Coastal Marine Conservation Area as well as Torrey Pines State Natural Reserve. The coastal chaparral biome has many plants also seen in the Torrey Pines reserve, such as lemonade berry, wild cucumber, coast spice bush, California sunflower, California buckwheat, and bladderpod.

Seabirds are a common sight near the campus, particularly seagulls, pelicans, plovers, egrets, and osprey. Peregrine falcons are also known to nest in the bluffs at the north end of campus.

===== Marine life =====
Marine life from La Jolla Shores to Black's Beach can be seen in very shallow depths, making snorkeling a popular activity. Marine organisms include leopard sharks, Garibaldi, shovelnose guitarfish, round stingrays, and thornback rays. Due to the high concentration of stingrays, locals practice the "stingray shuffle" to help avoid being stung.

Connecting to La Jolla Canyon, Scripps Canyon is a popular spot for divers and marine research. Common fish within the canyon are species of poacher, sole, rockfish, and lizardfish.

=== Nimitz Marine Facility ===
The Nimitz Marine Facility is the home port of all SIO research vessels and is accessible by land via Rosecrans Street in Point Loma. The facility is serviced hourly by bus route 84 of the San Diego MTS, running from the Navy Base to Shelter Island and Cabrillo National Monument.

The facility borders the Point Loma Navy Base, operated by the NIWC. As of 2008, a TWIC card is required for access to the waterfront at MarFac as required by the United States Coast Guard.

Buildings at the Nimitz Marine Facility are numbered in increasing order from the waterfront approaching Rosecrans Street.

Building Label	Notes
1	Administration and research technician workshop
2	Ship workshop and technician offices
3	Shipboard Electronics Group and calibration laboratory
4	SIO Marine Physical Laboratory and workshop

== Research programs ==
Scripps Institution of Oceanography researchers at sea

The institution's research programs encompass biological, physical, chemical, geological, and geophysical studies of the oceans and land. Scripps also studies the interaction of the oceans with both the atmospheric climate and environmental concerns on terra firma. Related to this research, Scripps offers undergraduate and graduate degrees.

Today, the Scripps staff of 1,300 includes approximately 235 faculty, 180 other scientists and some 350 graduate students, with an annual budget of more than $281 million. The institution operates a fleet of four oceanographic research vessels.

=== Research themes ===
Scripps follows a number of interdisciplinary research themes:

- Climate change impacts and adaption
- Resilience to hazards
- Human health and the oceans
- Innovative technology
- Polar science
- Biodiversity and conservation
- National security

=== CalCOFI program ===
The California Cooperative Oceanic Fisheries Investigations (CalCOFI) program, established in 1949, is an ongoing partnership between SIO, NOAA Fisheries, and the California Department of Fish and Wildlife to study sardine population collapse and the marine environment off the coast of Southern California. Data are collected on routine research cruises and are able to be compared over many decades in a large service area.

=== The Keeling Curve ===
The Keeling Curve

The Keeling Curve is the longest-running time series of atmospheric CO_{2}, beginning in 1958. Spearheaded by Charles David Keeling, SIO established a research center in Mauna Loa, Hawaii to record atmospheric carbon dioxide levels. Since then, SIO researchers have expanded the dataset into numerous other sampling locations and analytical parameters to monitor climate change.

=== Argo program ===
The Argo program is an international effort to survey ocean temperature, salinity, and currents. The program was developed in the late 1990s and chaired by SIO's Dean Roemmich and SIO researchers helped design the SOLO and SOLO-II float designs. SIO is also involved in Argo-related programs, such as GO-BGC (biogeochemical) and SOCCOM, and hosts Argo data on the Argo Global Marine Atlas.

=== Oceanographic collections ===
SIO maintains a large collection of marine and benthic organism collections, tracing back to William Ritter's samples from 1902. When ichthyologist Carl Hubbs arrived at SIO in 1944, the collections grew rapidly and expanded by around 9,000 samples in 2014 when SIO inherited collections from UCLA's Department of Ecology. SIO also has a geological collection of thousands of ocean cores, sea dredge hauls, microfossil slides, and rock samples.

Collection samples are commonly used for instruction at SIO and for public outreach at Birch Aquarium.

== Organizational structure ==
=== Research sections ===
Scripps Oceanography is divided into three research sections, each with its own subdivisions:

- Biology
  - Center for Marine Biotechnology & Biomedicine (CMBB)
  - Integrative Oceanography Division (IOD)
  - Marine Biology Research Division (MBRD)
- Earth
  - Cecil H. and Ida M. Green Institute of Geophysics and Planetary Physics (IGPP)
  - Geosciences Research Division (GRD)
- Oceans & Atmosphere
  - Climate, Atmospheric Science & Physical Oceanography (CASPO)
  - Marine Physical Laboratory (MPL)

=== Directors ===
Meenakshi Wadhwa took office as the director of Scripps Institution of Oceanography, Vice Chancellor for Marine Sciences, and Dean of the Graduate School of Marine Sciences on October 1, 2025.

==== List of SIO Directors ====
The following persons served as director of the Scripps Institution of Oceanography:

No.	Image	Director	Term start	Term end	Ref.
1		William E. Ritter	1912	1923	
2		Thomas W. Vaughan	1923	1936	
3		Harald U. Sverdrup	1936	1948	
4		Carl Eckart	1948	1950	
5		Roger Revelle	1951	1964	
6		Fred N. Speiss	1964	1965	
7		William A. Nierenberg	1965	1986	
8		Edward A. Frieman	July 1, 1986	August 31, 1996	
–		Wolfgang H. Berger	September 1, 1996	January 31, 1998	
9		Charles F. Kennel	February 1, 1998	September 11, 2006	
10		Tony Haymet	September 12, 2006	September 30, 2012	
–		Catherine Constable	October 1, 2012	September 30, 2013	
11		Margaret Leinen	October 1, 2013	present	

== Research vessels ==
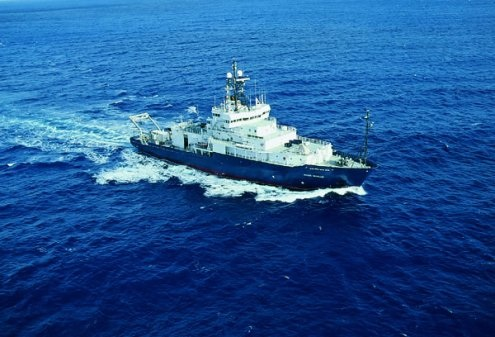
Scripps research vessel Roger Revelle

Scripps owns and operates several research vessels and platforms:

- RV Roger Revelle
- RV Sally Ride
- RV Robert Gordon Sproul
- RV Bob and Betty Beyster

Current and previous vessels larger than 50 ft (15 m)

Year acquired by SIO	Retired from SIO	Name	Notes
1904	1906	RV Loma	Pilot boat, ran aground in Point Loma
1907	1917	RV Alexander Agassiz	Schooner
1918	1918	RV Ellen Browning	
1925	1936	RV Scripps	Converted from a fishing vessel, exploded in 1936
1937	1955	RV E. W. Scripps	
1955	1965	RV Stranger	Operated as USS Jasper from 1941 to 1947 for the UC Division of War Research
1947	1956	RV Crest	
1947	1969	RV Horizon	
1948	1965	RV Paolina-T	
1949	1968	RV Horizon	
1951	1965	RV Spencer F. Baird	
1955	1969	T-441	
1956	1962	RV Orca	
1959	1963	RV Hugh M. Smith	
1959	1970	RV Argo	Official Navy name was Snatch
1962	1976	RV Alexander Agassiz	
1962	2023	RP FLIP	Designated RP as a Research Platform
1962	1974	RV Oconostota	The Oconostota was known as "The Rolling O" because of its unpleasant motion
1965	1980	RV Alpha Helix	Transferred to University of Alaska, Fairbanks in 1980, sold in 2007 to Stabbert Maritime
1965	1984	RV Ellen B. Scripps	
1966	1992	RV Thomas Washington	Transferred to Chile and renamed Vidal Gormaz. Scrapped 2012
1969	2014	RV Melville	Transferred to the Philippines in 2016 and renamed Gregorio Velasquez
1973		RV Gianna	
1978	2015	RV New Horizon	
1984	Present	RV Robert Gordon Sproul	
1995	Present	RV Roger Revelle	
2016	Present	RV Sally Ride	
2019	Present	RV Bob and Betty Beyster	42-feet long

=== Hybrid Hydrogen Research Vessel ===
In 2021, Scripps was awarded $35 million for the development of a new coastal research vessel as a replacement for the RV Robert Gordon Sproul, in service since 1984. The proposed vessel would be 125 feet long and take 3 years to build, becoming the first hybrid-hydrogen research vessel in the UNOLS fleet and aiding in the University of California's Carbon Neutrality Initiative. Scripps chose Seattle-based architect Glosten as the ship's designer, having work experience from numerous other SIO vessels. It is expected that the research vessel will operate on hydrogen power for 75% of its operations.

== Birch Aquarium ==
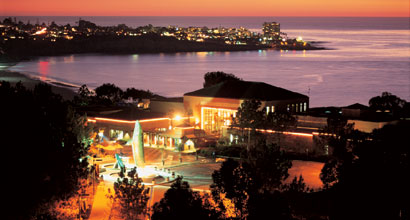
Birch Aquarium, with the Village of La Jolla in the background

Birch Aquarium, the public exploration center for the institution, features a Hall of Fishes with more than 60 tanks of Pacific fishes and invertebrates from the cold waters of the Pacific Northwest to the tropical waters of Mexico and the IndoPacific, a 13,000-gallon local shark and ray exhibit, interactive tide pools, and interactive science exhibits. In 2022, the aquarium opened a new exhibit for blue penguins.

== Notable alumni ==
- Tanya Atwater
- Thomas E. Bowman III
- Edward Brinton
- Stephen E. Calvert
- Kim Cobb
- Jack Corliss
- John M. Edmond
- Kenneth Farley
- Michael Freilich
- Susan M. Gaines
- Timothy Gallaudet
- Eric Giddens
- Susan Hough
- Ancel Keys
- Megan McArthur
- James J. McCarthy
- Marcia McNutt
- Jessica Meir
- Walter Munk
- Wheeler J. North
- Giuseppe Notarbartolo di Sciara
- Colm Ó hEocha
- Joseph R. Pawlik
- George Perry
- S. K. Satheesh
- Brinke Stevens
- Christopher Stott
- Brian Tucker
- Christine Essenberg

== Awards by SIO ==
SIO confers a number of awards for scientific advancement or betterment of society.

Award	First Given	Latest Recipient	Note
Amici cum Laude (Latin: "friends with praise")	1996	2013	An honor for supporters or friends in the greater oceanographic community
Cody Award	1989	2021	Scientific achievement; Named after Robert L. and Bettie P. Cody
Frieman Prize	1996	2022	For graduate student research; Edward Frieman
Nierenberg Prize	2001	2023	For contributions to research and public interest; William Nierenberg
Ritter Memorial Fellowship	1990	2020	Encouraging fellowship in the history of marine science; William Ritter
Roger Revelle Prize	2009	2009	For leaders in public or private sectors; Roger Revelle
Rosenblatt Award	2005	2019	For contributions in evolutionary biology; Richard H. and Glenda G. Rosenblatt
Teaching Awards	2003	2023	Two awards for graduate/undergraduate teaching and mentorship

== Popular culture ==
In 2014, the institution and its Keeling Curve measurement of atmospheric carbon dioxide levels were featured as a plot point in an episode of HBO's The Newsroom.

The Scripps Institution of Oceanography is frequently mentioned or used as a setting in fiction novels. The name is often abbreviated or fictionalized, borrowing from other identifying personalities or sights in La Jolla.

== See also ==
- Array Network Facility
- RISE project
- Scripps Research, a neighboring, but completely independent medical research institute
- Monterey Bay Aquarium Research Institute, a private, non-profit oceanographic research center in Moss Landing, California
- Moss Landing Marine Laboratories, a multi-campus marine research consortium of the California State University System
- Hopkins Marine Station, a similar research facility run by Stanford University in Monterey, California
- Hatfield Marine Science Center, a similar research facility associated with the Oregon State University and located in Newport, Oregon
- Woods Hole Oceanographic Institution, a similar research facility located in Woods Hole, Massachusetts
