= Centre for Science and Policy =

The Centre for Science and Policy (CSaP) at the University of Cambridge exists to improve links between academics and policy makers. Its main focus is on improving policy makers' access to scientific and engineering research, both to allow policy makers to make the best use of the available scientific evidence, and ensure that academics are better informed about public policy. The Centre attempts to achieve this goal by running three programmes:

- Policy Fellowships, which allow elected Fellows to create networks with academics to help them address questions in their own policy work
- Policy Challenges, which attempt to provide new perspectives on specific areas of public policy through collaborations between academics and policy makers
- Professional Development, which is designed to introduce early career researchers to policy-making through workshops, internships and government secondments.

Notable Policy Fellows include NESTA chief executive Geoff Mulgan, DG CONNECT Director-General Robert Madelin, and chief executive of the Joseph Rowntree Foundation Julia Unwin.

CSaP hosts visiting research fellows to research the science-policy interface. The first visiting research fellow was Professor Charles Kennel, who began his fellowship on 16 January 2014. CSaP was founded in 2009 under founding director Dr. David Cleevely. Dr. Robert Doubleday has been executive director since July 2012, taking over from Dr Chris Tyler (latterly Director of the Parliamentary Office of Science and Technology). It holds its annual conference at the Royal Society of London in April each year. CSAP also hosts an annual lecture, which in 2017 was given by Professor Chris Whitty, then Chief Scientific Adviser at the Department of Health.

CSaP's role in aiding policy makers was noted by Liberal Democrat Member of Parliament Julian Huppert in his science policy proposals drafted in 2012.

== See also ==
- David Cleevely
- Charles Kennel
