= David Thomas Pugh =

English marine scientist (1943–2022)

Dr David Thomas Pugh OBE
- David Pugh making temporary sea level measurements in the Falkland Islands in 2009
- Born: 13 July 1943; Liverpool, England
- Died: 1 August 2022 (aged 79); Wales
- Spouse: Carole
- Children: 1

Academic background
- Education: University College London, Churchill College, Cambridge
- Thesis: The Thermal Environment of the Deep-Sea Floor (1968)

Academic work
- Discipline: Oceanography, Hydrology and Meteorology

David Pugh OBE (13 July 1943 – 1 August 2022) was a British marine scientist and academic. He founded the Global Sea Level Observing System, was President of the Intergovernmental Oceanographic Commission of UNESCO, Director of the Permanent Service for Mean Sea Level and emeritus fellow of the UK National Oceanography Centre.

== Biography ==
Born in Liverpool, England, in 1943 to Welsh parents, Pugh was brought up in Trefnanney, Wales. He achieved his doctor of philosophy degree from Churchill College, Cambridge in 1968, with his doctoral thesis entitled "The Thermal Environment of the Deep-Sea Floor".

Following graduation one of his first positions was in 1969 when Pugh joined what came to be called the Proudman Oceanographic Laboratory, at Bidston Observatory in the Wirral. His work focused on sea level science and as part of this he invented a new class of tide gauge, called a "bubbler", which remains in use to this day in the United Kingdom. In 1984 Pugh was appointed as Head of Oceanography, Hydrology and Meteorology for the UK Natural Environment Research Council.

Along with American oceanographer Klaus Wyrtki, Pugh proposed and established the Global Sea Level Observing System (GLOSS), a program of the Intergovernmental Oceanographic Commission including real-time tsunami detection and contributing data to the global Permanent Service for Mean Sea Level (PSMSL) repository. He was the first Chair of GLOSS from its 1985 establishment, and also served as Director of the PSMSL. Pugh went on to become Chair of the Intergovernmental Oceanographic Commission from 2003 to 2007.

Pugh published over 50 academic works and articles during his career. His 1987 book, "Tides, Surges and Mean Sea Level—A handbook for engineers and scientists", has been reported as "used by an enormous number of researchers and students", and received positive reviews as a valuable reference work. Following retirement Pugh continued to undertake research into tides and sea level, and was emeritus fellow of the National Oceanography Centre.

Pugh died in Wales on 1 August 2022. He is survived by his wife, Carole, and son Gareth.

== Awards and honours ==
Pugh was awarded an OBE in the 2003 Birthday Honours for services to Marine Sciences as Secretary of the Inter-Agency Committee on Marine Science and Technology.

== Selected works ==
- Pugh, David (1987). Tides, surges and mean sea-level: a handbook for engineers and scientists (PDF). Wiley. ISBN 9780471915058.
- Pugh, David (2004). Changing Sea Levels Effects of Tides, Weather and Climate. Cambridge University Press. p. 265. ISBN 9780521532181.
- Pugh, David; Woodworth, Philip (2014). Sea-level science : understanding tides, surges tsunamis and mean sea-level changes. Cambridge University Press. ISBN 9781107028197.

== See also ==
- Keith R. Thompson – Professor of Oceanography
- Walter H. F. Smith – Geophysicist
- Philip Woodworth – British oceanographer
