= Keith R. Thompson =

Professor of Oceanography

Keith Thompson (1951 - 2022) was a professor at Dalhousie University with a joint appointment in the Department of Oceanography and the Department of Mathematics and Statistics.

Thompson was trained in the UK and obtained his Ph.D. from the University of Liverpool in 1979. His research interests focused on ocean and shelf circulation, 4D data assimilation, extremal analysis and applied time series analysis.

Prof. Thompson was awarded a Tier I Canada Research Chair in Marine Prediction and Environmental Statistics. The Canada Research Chairs Program is part of a national strategy to make Canada one of the world’s top five countries for research and development. Chair holders are recognized leaders in their fields and are selected in order to advance the frontiers of knowledge, not only through research, but also by teaching and supervising students and coordinating the work of other researchers. Prof. Thompson has been awarded a Tier I chair, which is the highest level. (For more information on the Canada Research Chairs program see http://www.chairs.gc.ca/).

Prof. Thompson was also awarded the President’s Prize of the Canadian Oceanographic and Meteorological Society in 1990, and Reviewer of the Year by the same organization. He has written over 50 scientific publications and sits on international committees including the Coastal Ocean Observations Panel of the Global Ocean Observing System. Thompson was awarded the J.P. Tully Medal in Oceanography from the Canadian Meteorological and Oceanographic Society in 2016. Thompson died aged 71 on 11 July 2022.

== See also ==
- David Thomas Pugh – English marine scientist (1943–2022)
- Philip Woodworth – British oceanographer
- Klaus Wyrtki – American oceanographer
