= Ishiguro Storm Surge Computer =

Analog computer

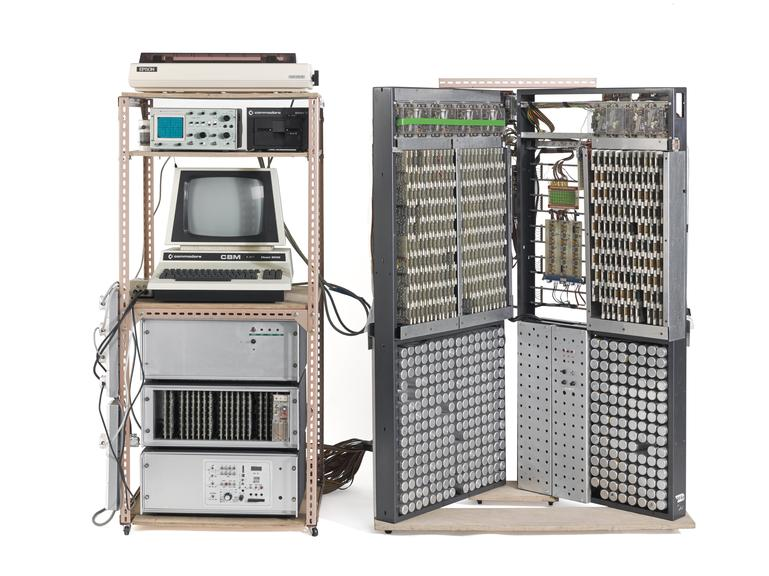
Shizuo Ishiguro's machine

The Ishiguro Storm Surge Machine is an analogue computer built by Japanese oceanographer Shizuo Ishiguro. Between 1960 and 1983, it was used to model storm surges in the North Sea by the UK National Institute of Oceanography. It is now on display in the Mathematics Gallery of the Science Museum in London.

== History ==
Following the serious North Sea flood of 1953, the UK government set up a committee (known as the Waverley Committee) to develop a plan to prevent future disasters. The UK National Institute of Oceanography (NIO, now the National Oceanography Centre) was responsible for scientific investigation of storm surges in the UK. In 1957 Shizuo Ishiguro, a Japanese oceanographer who had been developing analogue methods for predicting ocean surges joined the NIO to apply his work to the North Sea. Initially, this was through a UNESCO fellowship but he later became a permanent employee of the NIO. Ishiguro continued to develop and apply his analogue model until the early 1980s, when improvements in digital computers led many oceanographers to favour numerical simulations. Ishiguro retired in 1983 but continued to work on his machine at home until his death in 2007. Ishiguro's storm surge computer was then acquired by the Science Museum, London where it is part of a display in the Mathematics Gallery about modelling the seas.

== Description ==
Ishiguro's machine is an analogue computer where electrical voltage and current are used to mimic the height and flow of water. The North Sea is represented as a grid with approximately 80 nodes which are connected electrically so that the flow of electricity between the nodes represents the flow of water between different points of the North Sea. The flow of water between points in the North Sea depends on the difference in water height, on fixed physical features such as coastlines and sea depth, on the Coriolis force (due to the Earth's rotation) and on time-dependent effects such as tidal forces (due to the gravitational effect of the Moon and the Sun).

The model mimics these using combinations of electrical components (resistors, capacitors, inductors) and signal generators to provide time-dependent inputs. The model simulates how a storm surge, typically approaching from the North, might move southwards across the North Sea. It predicts water flow and height at different locations and times allowing assessment of the maximum tidal height and the time at which the maximum might be expected at specific locations. A common use of the model was to investigate the need for sea walls and coastal defences. A film made by the NIO showing Ishiguro's explanation of the computer is in the archives of the National Oceanography Centre at the University of Southampton.

The physical structure of the computer comprises two panels containing the electrical grid used for the simulation, and a separate input/output section. Inputs were made using a Commodore CBM 8032 Computer with 5¼" floppy disk drives; the output was displayed on an Advance Instruments OS-240 oscilloscope and recorded photographically.

Digital computers (where the equations of flow are solved numerically) were available in the 1960s but Ishiguro argued that the analogue approach was more flexible and avoided the computational problems of working with discrete time steps. Subsequent improvements in electronic computers means that numerical modelling is now more commonly used than analogue modelling; modern examples include the National Tidal and Sea-level Facility in the UK or the "Sea, Lake, and Overland Surge from Hurricane" model used by US agencies.

== See also ==
- Deltar
