= Shizuo Ishiguro =

Japanese oceanographer (1920–2007)

- Born: 1920
- Died: 2007 (aged 86–87)
- Education: University of Tokyo
- Occupation: Oceanographer
- Organization: UK National Institute of Oceanography
- Children: Kazuo Ishiguro

Shizuo Ishiguro (1920–2007) was a Japanese oceanographer who studied the dynamics of ocean waves using analog computing. He worked at the Nagasaki Marine Observatory from 1948 to 1960 receiving his doctorate from the University of Tokyo in 1958. His focus was large water oscillations known as “abiki” which occasionally cause ocean flooding in Nagasaki Bay. In 1957, Ishiguro was awarded a UNESCO fellowship to join the UK National Institute of Oceanography to adapt his work for storm surges in the North Sea, such as the serious flood of 1953.

== Analysis of North Sea Flood ==
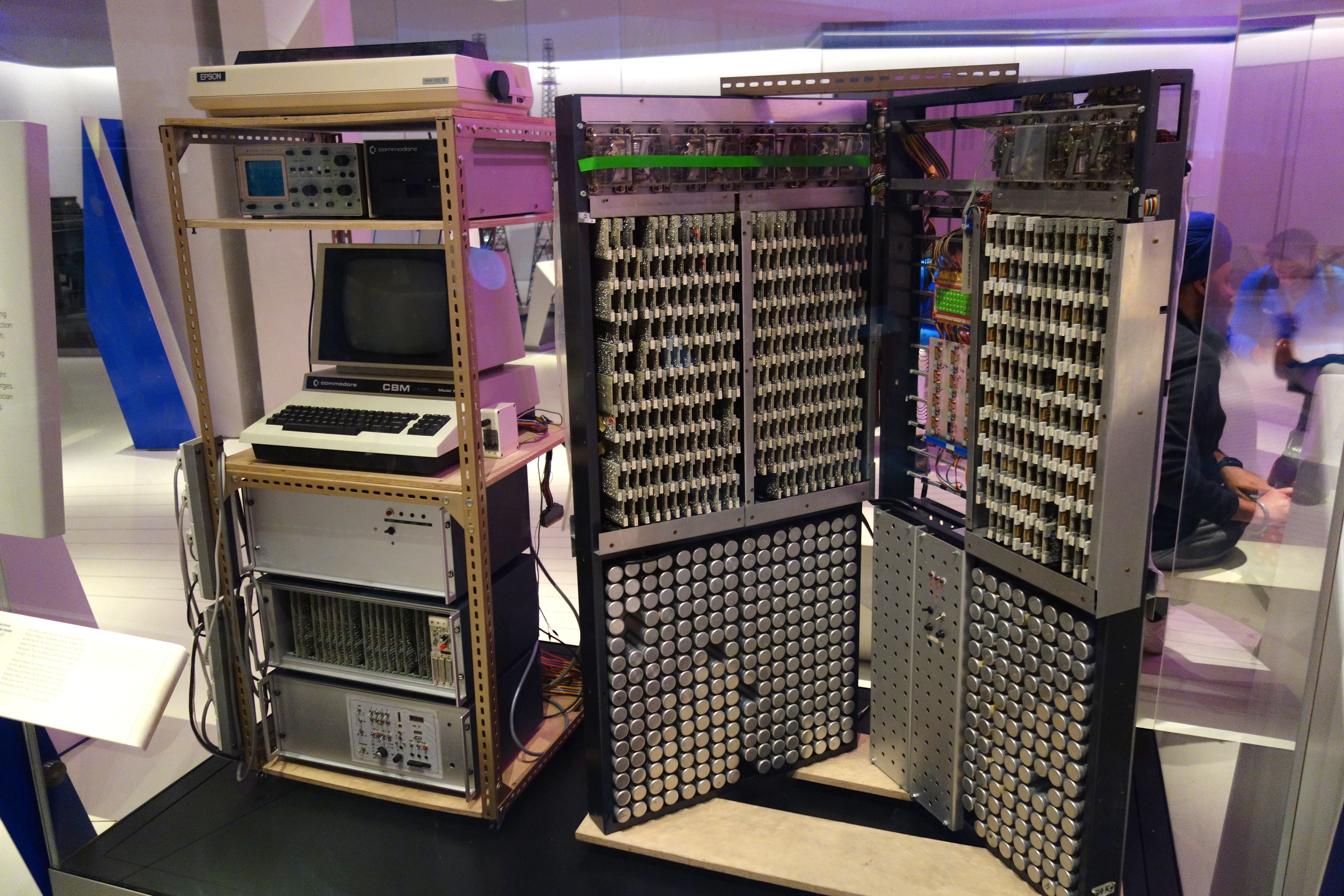
Electronic ocean model, built by Shizuo Ishiguro, 1960-1983

The North Sea Flood occurred on the evening of the 31 January 1953 when low atmospheric pressure, high winds and a high spring tide caused the sea level to rise five metres above its usual height. Serious flooding occurred on the east coast of England, the Netherlands, and Belgium. To perform his analysis, Ishiguro constructed an analog computer which relies on the mathematical similarity between the flow of electricity through a network and the flow of water in the sea during a storm-surge. The storm surge computer is now on display in the Mathematics: the Winton Gallery of the Science Museum in London as part of an exhibit about mathematical modelling of the sea.

== Personal life ==
Shizuo Ishiguro is the father of Nobel Prize winning author, Kazuo Ishiguro.
