= British Oceanographic Data Centre =

National facility for conserving and distributing data about the marine environment

Coordinates: 53°24′27.5″N 2°58′8.2″W

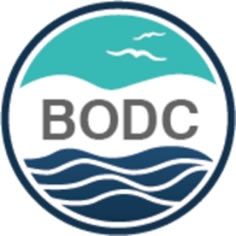
- Formation: 1969
- Location: Liverpool, United Kingdom
- Head of BODC: Helen Snaith
- Parent organization: National Oceanography Centre (NOC)
- Website: www.bodc.ac.uk

The British Oceanographic Data Centre (BODC) is a national facility in the United Kingdom that collects and distributes marine environmental data. It serves as the designated marine science data centre for the UK and is part of the National Oceanography Centre (NOC). Most of its operations are conducted at its Liverpool facility, with a smaller team based in Southampton. The BODC supports science, education, industry, and the general public by providing access to comprehensive marine data.

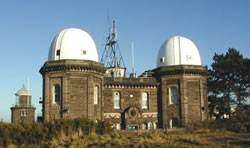
Bidston Observatory, home of BODC from 1975 to 2004.

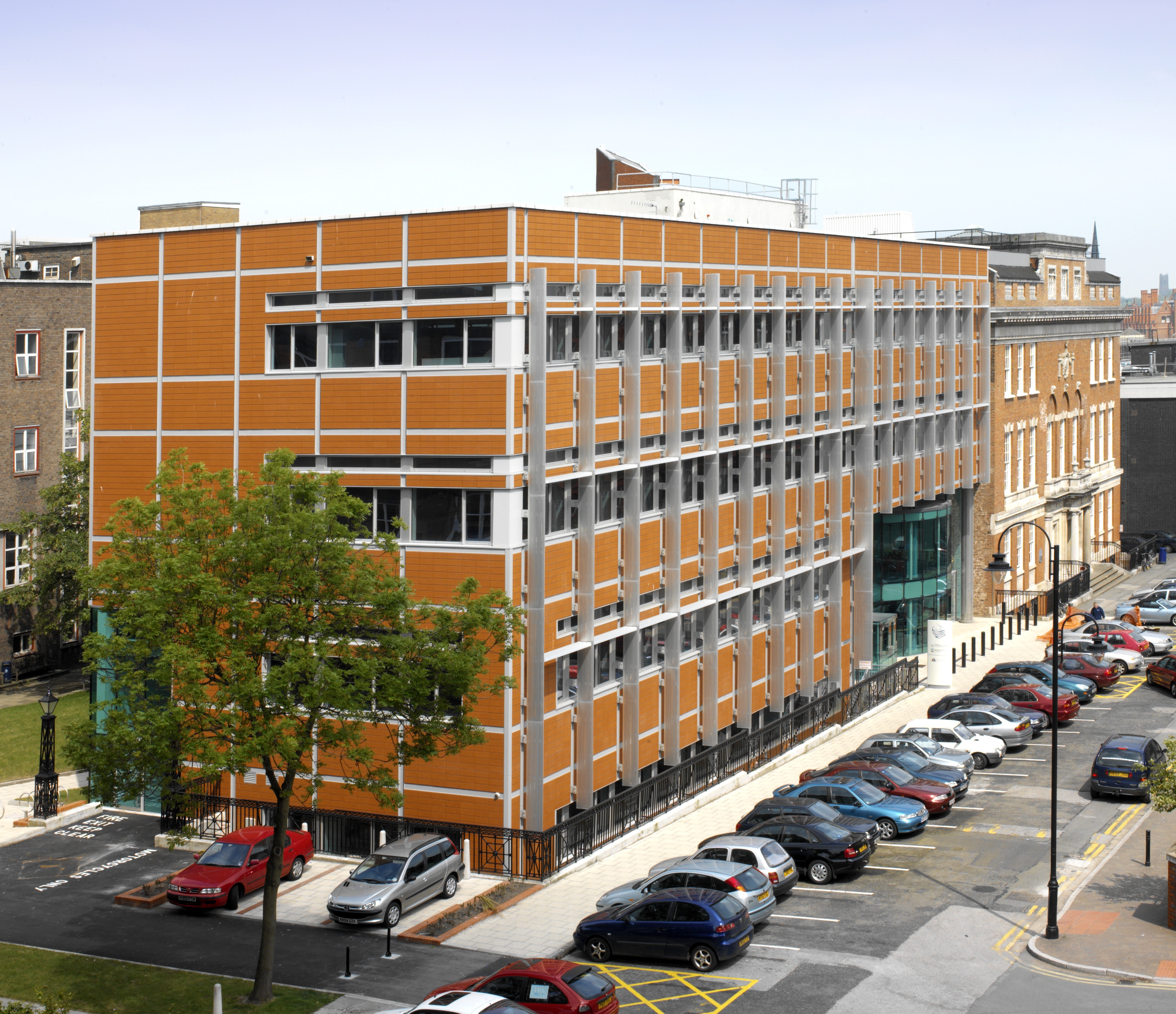
Joseph Proudman Building, Liverpool.

== History ==
In 1969, the Natural Environment Research Council (NERC) created the British Oceanographic Data Service (BODS). Located at the National Institute of Oceanography in Wormley, Surrey, its stated purposes were to act as the UK's national oceanographic data centre and to participate in the international exchange of data as part of the Intergovernmental Oceanographic Commission (IOC) network of national data centres.

In 1975, BODS was transferred to Bidston Observatory on the Wirral, near Liverpool, as part of the newly formed Institute of Oceanographic Sciences. The following year, BODS became the Marine Information and Advisory Service (MIAS). Its primary activity was to manage the data collected from weather ships, oil rigs, and data buoys. The data banking component of MIAS was restructured to form BODC in April 1989.

In December 2004, BODC moved to the purpose-built Joseph Proudman Building on the campus of the University of Liverpool. A small number of its staff are based in the National Oceanography Centre (NOC), Southampton.

== National Role ==
BODC is one of five designated data centres that make up the NERC Environmental Data Service and manage NERC's environmental data. The BODC has stated that it has a number of national roles and responsibilities:

- Performing data management for NERC-funded marine projects
- Maintaining and developing its archive of marine data, the National Oceanographic Database (NODB)
- Managing, checking and archiving data from tide gauges around the UK coast for the National Tide Gauge Network, which aims to obtain high quality tidal information and to provide warning of possible flooding of coastal areas around the British Isles. This is part of the National Tidal & Sea Level Facility (NTSLF)
- Hosting the Marine Environmental Data and Information Network
- Working in partnership with other NERC marine research centres:
  - British Antarctic Survey (BAS)
  - National Oceanography Centre (NOC), Liverpool, formerly Proudman Oceanographic Laboratory (POL)
  - National Oceanography Centre (NOC), Southampton
  - Plymouth Marine Laboratory (PML)
  - Scottish Association for Marine Science (SAMS)
  - Sea Mammal Research Unit (SMRU)

== International Role ==
The BODC's stated international roles and responsibilities include:

- Contributing to the International Council for the Exploration of the Sea (ICES) Marine Data Management
- Creating, maintaining and publishing the General Bathymetric Chart of the Oceans (GEBCO) Digital Atlas

BODC is one of over 60 national oceanographic data centres that form part of the IOC International Oceanographic Data and Information Exchange (IODE).
