= National Oceanography Centre Southampton =

Centre for research, teaching, and technology development in Ocean and Earth science

Coordinates: 50°53′34″N 1°23′41.3″W

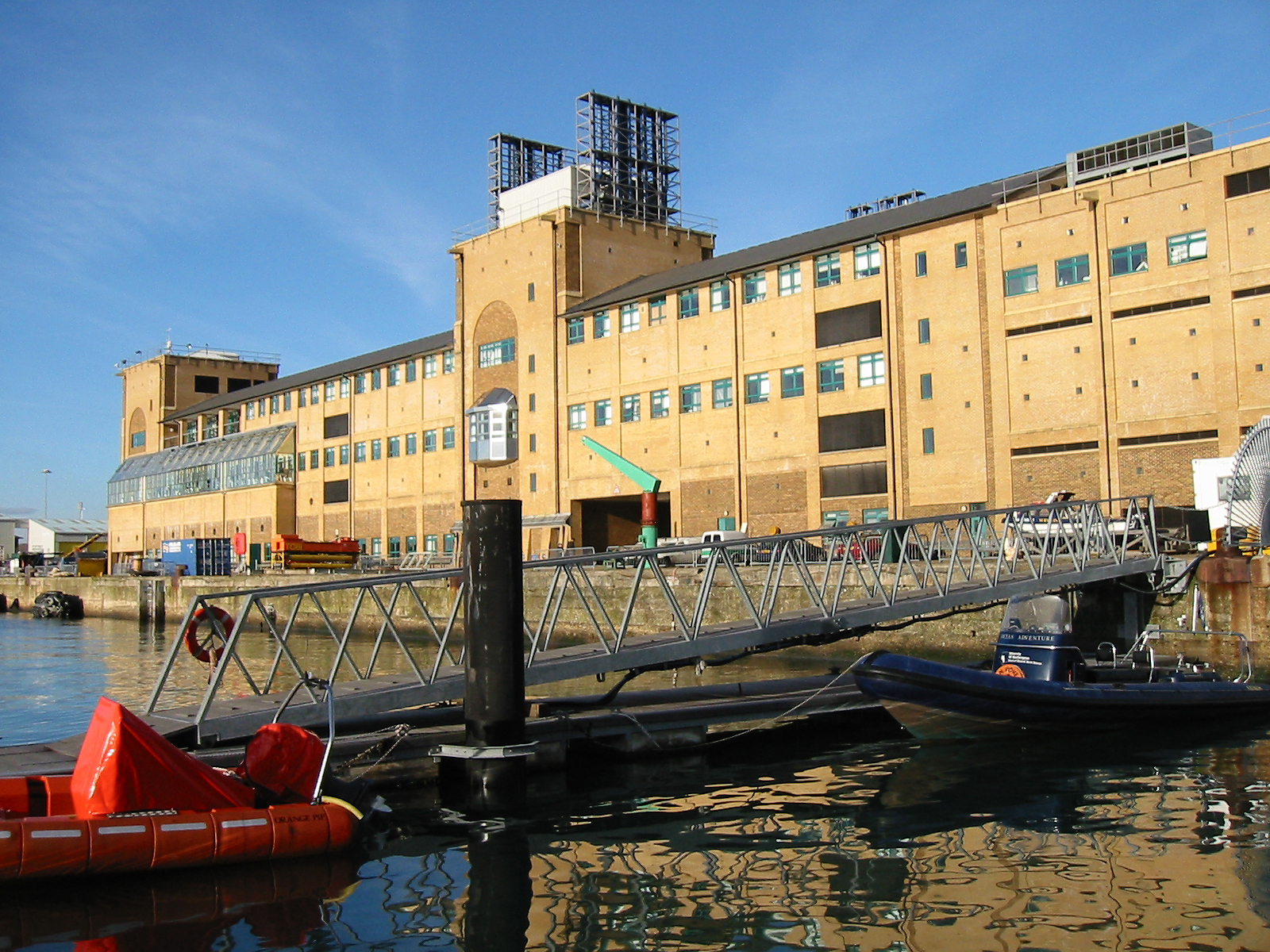
- Former name: Southampton Oceanography Centre (SOC)
- Type: public research and teaching institution
- Established: 1994
- Academic staff: 125 OES + 150 NOC
- Undergraduates: 750
- Postgraduates: 45
- Doctoral students: 205
- Website: https://www.noc.ac.uk

The National Oceanography Centre Southampton (NOCS) is a centre for research, teaching, and technology development in Ocean and Earth science. NOCS was created in 1995, jointly between the University of Southampton and the UK Natural Environment Research Council and is located within the port of Southampton at a purpose-built dockside campus with modern facilities. In 2010 the university and NERC components demerged, and the NERC-managed component became the National Oceanography Centre (NOC – with the Proudman Oceanographic Laboratory in Liverpool). The two components of NOCS continue close collaboration through the jointly run Graduate School, shared research facilities and laboratories, complementary research groups, and many joint research grants and publications. The university component “Ocean and Earth Science, National Oceanography Centre Southampton” (OES) is part of the Faculty of Environmental and Life Sciences, (FELS). It was ranked 46th in the world for Earth and Marine Sciences by the QS World University Rankings in 2019.

In November 2019, NOC became formally independent from the NERC and now operates as a company limited by guarantee with charitable status.

== History ==
The centre can trace its origins back to the years immediately after Second World War, when the National Institute of Oceanography (NIO) was founded.

The plan to create National Oceanography Centre Southampton as a centre of excellence in marine and earth science was formulated in the late 1980s to early 1990s by the Natural Environment Research Council in coordination with the University of Southampton. According to that plan a research and teaching complex was erected on the new Waterfront Campus dock-side location within the Port of Southampton to become the new home for the former National Institute of Oceanographic Science (from Wormley, Surrey), the Research Vessel Service (from Barry, Wales) and the former University of Southampton departments of Geology and Oceanography. NOCS was officially opened in 1996 as the Southampton Oceanography Centre by Prince Philip. He also performed the renaming ceremony when it became the National Oceanography Centre, Southampton, in 2005.

The centre's inaugural director from 1994 to 1999 was John Shepherd, a former deputy director of the Ministry of Agriculture, Fisheries and Food and an Earth system scientist.

== Research ==
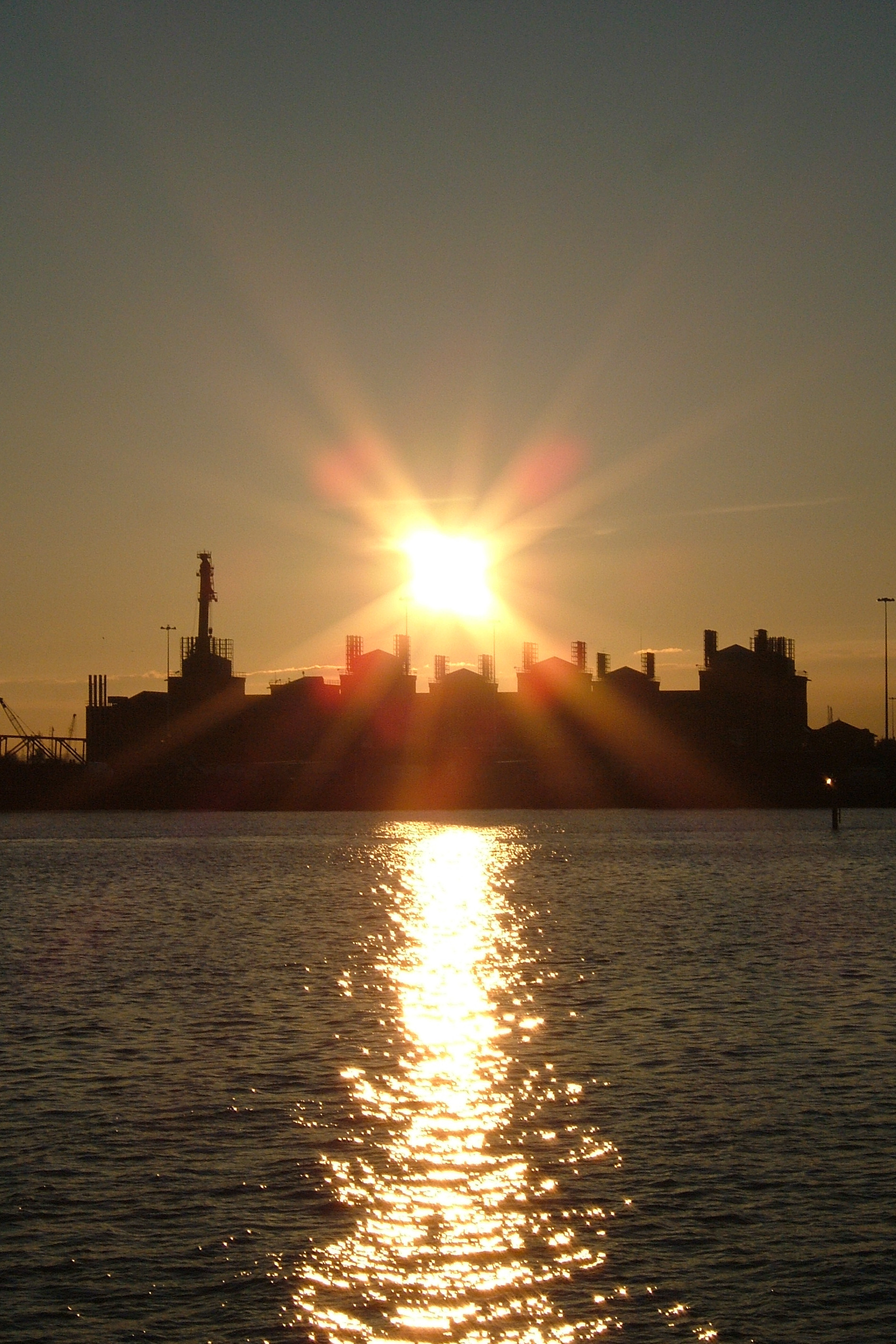
National Oceanography Centre, Southampton at sunset

Research at NOCS listed by groups affiliated with the University of Southampton's School of Ocean and Earth Science (SOES) and the Southampton branch office of the National Oceanography Centre:

OES (University of Southampton)

- Geochemistry
- Geology and Geophysics (G&G)
- Marine Biology and Ecology (MBE)
- Marine Biogeochemistry
- Paleoceanography and Paleoclimate (PALEO)
- Physical Oceanography (POC)

NOC, Southampton (Natural Environment Research Council)

- Marine Geoscience
- Marine Physics and Ocean Climate
- Marine Systems Modelling
- Ocean Biogeochemistry and Ecosystems
- Ocean Technology and Engineering

NOCS's on-site resources include the National Marine Facilities, UK National Oceanographic Library, the Discovery Collections, a branch of the British Oceanographic Data Centre and the British Ocean Sediment Core Repository. The National Oceanographic Library holds the UK's most extensive collection of oceanographic literature and one of the largest marine science libraries in Europe.

OES was ranked 30th in the world for Earth and Marine Sciences in 2014 by the QS World University Rankings, rising from 47th in 2012 and 38th in 2013.

== Facilities ==
NOCS consists of the University of Southampton's School of Ocean and Earth Science, together with five NERC research divisions and the NERC's National Marine Facilities Sea Systems. In addition, NOCS houses teaching facilities for nearly 1000 students (undergraduate, Master and PhD).

=== Research vessels ===
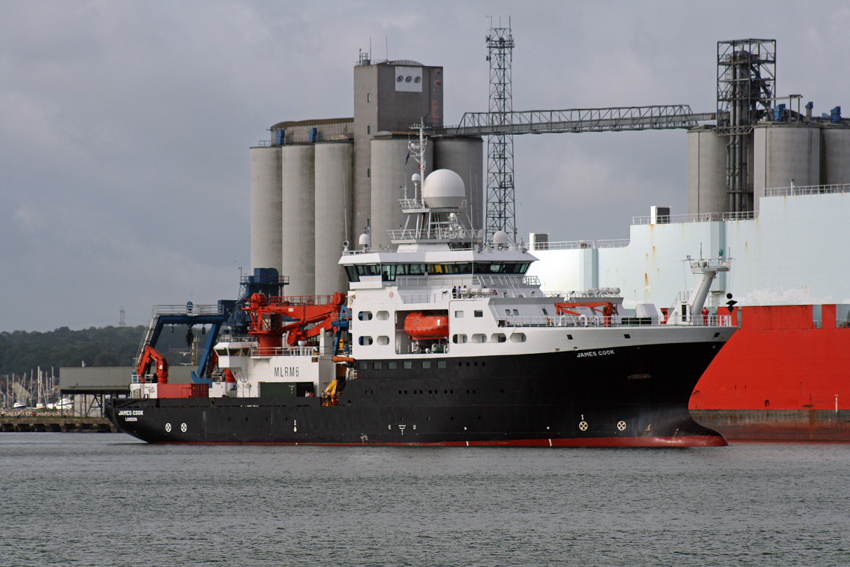
RRS James Cook returning to Southampton

NOCS is the base for the purpose-built research vessels RRS Discovery and RRS James Cook (and formerly RRS Charles Darwin). For fieldwork and research by university staff and students OES operates a smaller vessel, the 19.75 metres (64.8 ft) catamaran RV Callista.

=== Autonomous and Robotic Systems ===
NOCS is home to the Marine Autonomous and Robotic Systems group; part of National Marine Facilities Sea Systems, which has the mission to "develop, coordinate and provide capabilities, platforms and expertise to meet the needs of UK marine science." The group operates three fleets of submersibles and autonomous vehicles, comprising Autosub submarines, underwater gliders and remotely operated vehicles.

=== Research aquariums ===
NOCS has multi-use aquarium facilities with a variety of tanks displaying a range of biotopes and habitats, including seagrass beds, rocky shores and rock pool environments. Additionally, it operates two IPOCAMPs (Note: (Incubateur Pressurisé pour l'Observation et la Culture d'Animaux Marins Profonds/Pressurized Incubator for the Observation and Cultivation of Deep-Sea Marine Animals)) and a number of smaller pressurized tanks for the study of deep-sea organisms. The Coral Reef Laboratory is equipped with a multi-compartment aquarium system that houses a range of coral and other cnidarians.

=== Analytical instrumentation ===
NOCS has a variety of large and small analytical instrumentation. The Magnetism Laboratory is equipped with a MicroMag 3900 Vibrating Sample Magnetometer, an AGICO KLY4S Kappabridge and a 2G Superconducting Rock Magnetometer. The X-Ray Diffraction facility is equipped with a X’Pert pro XRD machine with Cu X-ray tube. For geochemical analysis NOCS houses a range of large analytical instrumentation, including two Thermo NEPTUNE multi collector inductively coupled plasma mass spectrometers (MC-ICP-MS), a Thermo X-SERIES 2 Quadrupole ICP-MS, a Thermo ELEMENT 2XR high-resolution ICP-MS, a Thermo TRITON and a VG Sector 54 Thermal Ionization system, a New Wave NWR193 laser ablation system. For analysis of dissolved organic carbon and total dissolved nitrogen the Southampton-based branch of the NERC NOC is operating a Shimandzu TOV V CPN-TN at NOCS. For seismic studies of the seafloor, sediment packages and sub-seafloor structures the Marine Geophysics group at NOCS operates a wide range of instrumentation, including Chirp, Boomer, Sparker and 3D Chirp sources, single- and multi-channel hydrophones, several multibeam systems and a sidescan sonar. The Ocean Bottom Instrumentation Consortium based at NOCS provides the academic and commercial communities with access to a range of multi-sensor seabed instruments.

=== British Ocean Sediment Core Repository ===
The British Ocean Sediment Core Repository (BOSCORF) located at NOCS and operated by NERC is the central storage facility for sediment cores collected by NERC ships and NERC-funded research. All cores are logged and all data generated from the cores is archived for visualization and open access.

== Education ==
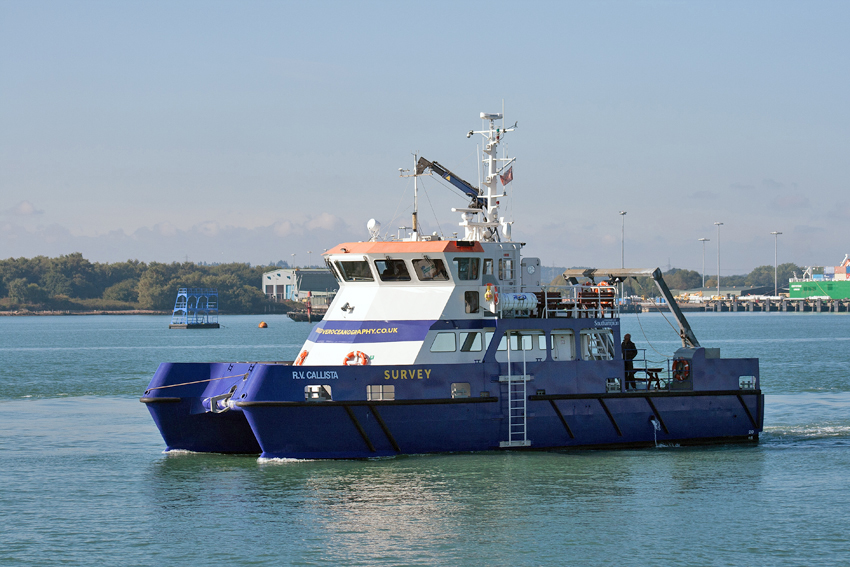
RV Callista provides hands-on sea-going experience for students

=== Undergraduate programs ===
Three tracks of undergraduate education are offered at the NOCS: a three-year Bachelor of Science, a four-year Integrated Master of Science, and a Foundation Year for students without an appropriate A level. Four undergraduate programs are offered, in Oceanography, Marine Biology, Geology and Geophysics.

=== Postgraduate programs ===
The Graduate School of the National Oceanography Centre Southampton offers degree programs at both Master and PhD level. Furthermore, NOCS is the lead of the Southampton Partnership for Innovative Training of Future Investigators Researching the Environment consortium, which also includes the British Antarctic Survey, Plymouth Marine Laboratory, the Natural History Museum, London, the NERC Centre for Ecology & Hydrology, and others. The consortium is funded through NERCs Doctoral Training Partnership initiative.

=== General public ===
Activities and events include an annual Ocean and Earth Day, a public seminar series of marine life talks, and "Discover Oceanography" sessions aboard Callista.

== Policies ==
=== Diversity policies ===
Both OES and National Oceanography Centre have joined Athena SWAN. OES was awarded an Athena SWAN Bronze Award, showing that the wider university had "a solid foundation for eliminating gender bias and developing an inclusive culture that values all staff", and that the department had "identified particular challenges" and was "planning activities for the future".

=== Sustainability policies ===
In July 2008 NOCS achieved ISO14001 certification (see ISO 14000) for its Environmental Management System. As part of the wider efforts to conserve electrical power and water consumption 544 solar panels and waterless urinals were installed.

== See also ==
- Permanent Service for Mean Sea Level – Repository for tide gauge data used in the measurement of long-term sea level change
- Global Sea Level Observing System – Program to measure global sea levels
- Newlyn Tidal Observatory – British tidal observatory
- List of British Oceanographers on Wikipedia
