= Climate of Liverpool =

Liverpool, United Kingdom

Climate chart (precipitation, max. and min. temperature)
J	F	M	A	M	J	J	A	S	O	N	D
75 7 2	54 7 2	64 9 4	54 12 5	55 16 8	66 18 11	59 20 13	69 19 13	72 17 11	97 14 8	83 10 5	89 8 3
- █ Average max. and min. temperatures in °C
- █ Precipitation totals in mm
Imperial conversion
J	F	M	A	M	J	J	A	S	O	N	D
2.9 45 36	2.1 45 36	2.5 49 39	2.1 54 41	2.2 60 46	2.6 64 52	2.3 67 56	2.7 67 56	2.8 63 52	3.8 57 47	3.3 50 41	3.5 46 37
- █ Average max. and min. temperatures in °F
- █ Precipitation totals in inches

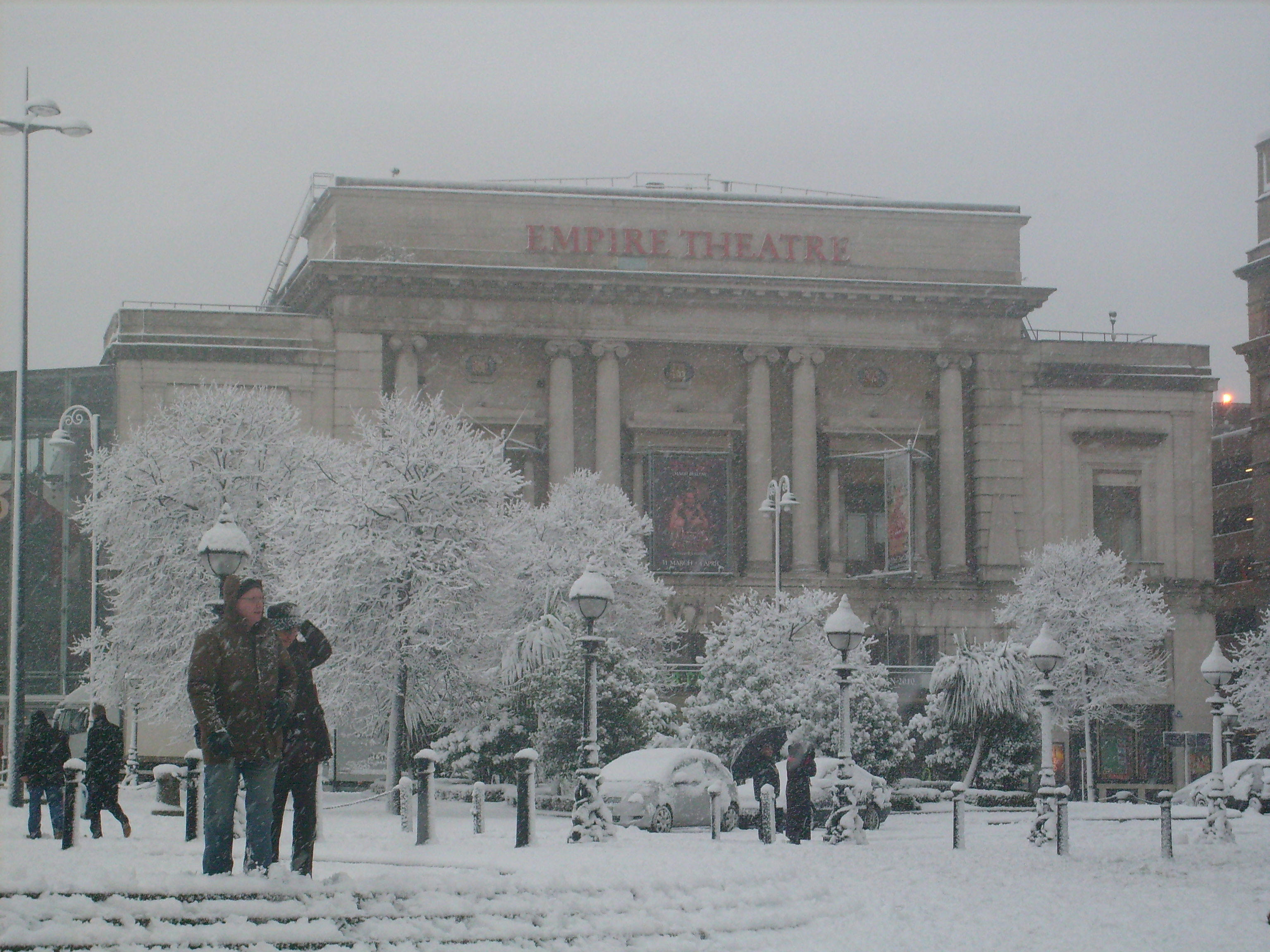
Snow falling in Liverpool city centre during the winter of 2010

The climate of Liverpool features a temperate maritime variety (Köppen: Cfb), with relatively mild summers, cool winters and rainfall spread fairly evenly throughout the year. Since 1867, rainfall and temperature records for the city have been kept at Bidston Observatory, as well as atmospheric pressure records since 1846. However, the site closed down in 2002, and a weather station in Crosby has been used by the Met Office since. Irregular meteorological observations have been taken in the city since at least 1768, with unbroken records extending for long periods of time. This includes observations taken at the Liverpool Dock from 1768 to 1798, an unspecified location from 1772 to 1799 and West Derby from 1830 to 1859 and at other unspecified locations in the city from at least 1860 onward. Continuous observations in different areas of the city have been taken since 1830. In modern times, there have also been other stations to operate in the Liverpool area, including stations at West Kirby (1912–1979), Aigburth (1967–1994), and Liverpool John Lennon Airport (1946–present).

Since records began, the lowest temperature ever recorded in the Liverpool and Merseyside area is −17.6 °C (0.3 °F) on 21 December 2010, and the highest temperature recorded is 36.0 °C (96.8 °F) was on 18 July 2022, and 19 July 2022. The highest daily minimum temperature is 22.5 °C (72.5 °F) reported on 19 July 2022, and the lowest daily maximum temperature is −6.9 °C (19.6 °F) on 20 December 2010. On average, the amount of air frost days per year is below the national average, and in winter, snow is not very common, with heavy snow occurring rarely. Rain is also a common occurrence in the city, but droughts have been known to cause some canal infrastructure problems in the summer, without affecting consumer consumption to any noticeable extent, the most recent drought occurring in the 2018 heat wave.

== Classifications ==
Liverpool Climate according to major climate systems
Climatic scheme	Initials	Description
Köppen system	Cfb	Oceanic climate (Note: Also called marine west coast.)
Trewartha system	Do	Temperate oceanic climate
Alisov system	—	Temperate climate (Note: Mid-latitude temperate maritime climate)
Strahler system	—	Marine west-coast
Thornthwaite system	C2 B'1	Moist subhumid
Neef system	—	West side/maritime climate

== Temperature ==
The average yearly high temperature in Liverpool is 13.2 °C (55.8 °F) and the average yearly low temperature is 7.2 °C (45.0 °F). The average daily mean is 10.1 °C (50.2 °F).

=== Averages ===
Climate data for Crosby, (Note: Weather station is located 7 miles (11 km) from the Liverpool city centre.) elevation: 30 m (98 ft), 1981–2010 averages
Month	Jan	Feb	Mar	Apr	May	Jun	Jul	Aug	Sep	Oct	Nov	Dec	Year
Mean daily maximum °C (°F)	7.2 (45.0)	7.3 (45.1)	9.4 (48.9)	12.2 (54.0)	15.6 (60.1)	17.9 (64.2)	19.7 (67.5)	19.4 (66.9)	17.3 (63.1)	13.9 (57.0)	10.2 (50.4)	7.5 (45.5)	13.2 (55.8)
Daily mean °C (°F)	4.8 (40.6)	4.7 (40.5)	6.6 (43.9)	8.7 (47.7)	11.8 (53.2)	14.5 (58.1)	16.5 (61.7)	16.3 (61.3)	14.2 (57.6)	11.1 (52.0)	7.7 (45.9)	5.0 (41.0)	10.1 (50.2)
Mean daily minimum °C (°F)	2.4 (36.3)	2.1 (35.8)	3.8 (38.8)	5.1 (41.2)	7.9 (46.2)	11.1 (52.0)	13.3 (55.9)	13.2 (55.8)	11.0 (51.8)	8.2 (46.8)	5.2 (41.4)	2.5 (36.5)	7.2 (45.0)
Source 1: Met Office
Source 2: National Oceanography Centre

=== Extremes ===
Due to Liverpool having an oceanic climate, extremes of temperatures are rare. Furthermore, being located close to the sea, wind chill is enhanced as a result of stronger winds as well as heat indexes being higher as a result of the higher humidity found close to bodies of water.

Climate data for Crosby, elevation: 30 m (98 ft), 1867–present extremes (Note: From 1867–2002, extremes were recorded at the Bidston Observatory in Wirral. Since 2002, extremes were recorded at Crosby, Sefton.)
Month	Jan	Feb	Mar	Apr	May	Jun	Jul	Aug	Sep	Oct	Nov	Dec	Year
Record high °C (°F)	15.1 (59.2)	18.9 (66.0)	21.2 (70.2)	24.6 (76.3)	28.2 (82.8)	30.7 (87.3)	36.0 (96.8)	34.5 (94.1)	30.4 (86.7)	25.9 (78.6)	18.7 (65.7)	15.8 (60.4)	36.0 (96.8)
Record low °C (°F)	−13.1 (8.4)	−11.3 (11.7)	−7.2 (19.0)	−5.6 (21.9)	−1.7 (28.9)	3.4 (38.1)	6.6 (43.9)	3.1 (37.6)	1.7 (35.1)	−2.9 (26.8)	−7.5 (18.5)	−17.6 (0.3)	−17.6 (0.3)
Source 1: Met Office
Source 2: National Oceanography Centre

==== Highest averages ====
Period	Record mean	Year
Year	11.0 °C (51.8 °F)	1990, 1995
Spring (March–May)	10.60 °C (51.08 °F)	1893
Summer (June–August)	17.43 °C (63.37 °F)	1995
Autumn (September–November)	11.90 °C (53.42 °F)	1959
Winter (December–February)	7.53 °C (45.55 °F)	1988 / 1989
January	8.1 °C (46.6 °F)	1916
February	8.5 °C (47.3 °F)	1998
March	9.1 °C (48.4 °F)	1938, 1957
April	11.5 °C (52.7 °F)	2011
May	13.7 °C (56.7 °F)	1919
June	16.5 °C (61.7 °F)	1970
July	19.0 °C (66.2 °F)	2006
August	19.3 °C (66.7 °F)	1995
September	16.1 °C (61.0 °F)	1895
October	13.5 °C (56.3 °F)	1921
November	10.7 °C (51.3 °F)	1994
December	10.0 °C (50.0 °F)	2015

==== Lowest averages ====
Period	Record mean	Year
Year	8.0 °C (46.4 °F)	1879
Spring (March–May)	6.76 °C (44.17 °F)	2013
Summer (June–August)	13.60 °C (56.48 °F)	1922
Autumn (September–November)	8.63 °C (47.53 °F)	1905, 1952
Winter (December–February)	0.77 °C (33.39 °F)	1962 / 1963
January	−0.9 °C (30.4 °F)	1881
February	−1.1 °C (30.0 °F)	1895
March	2.9 °C (37.2 °F)	1883, 2013
April	5.3 °C (41.5 °F)	1917
May	8.9 °C (48.0 °F)	1923
June	11.5 °C (52.7 °F)	1972
July	13.4 °C (56.1 °F)	1954
August	13.0 °C (55.4 °F)	1912
September	11.2 °C (52.2 °F)	1952
October	7.2 °C (45.0 °F)	1896
November	3.7 °C (38.7 °F)	1915
December	−0.9 °C (30.4 °F)	2010

==== Highest daily temperatures ====
Period	Record temperature	Date
January	15.1 °C (59.2 °F)	9 January 1971
February	18.9 °C (66.0 °F)	26 February 2019
March	21.2 °C (70.2 °F)	29 March 1965
April	24.6 °C (76.3 °F)	17 April 2003
May	28.2 °C (82.8 °F)	26 May 2017
June	30.7 °C (87.3 °F)	6 June 1950
July	36.0 °C (96.8 °F)	18 July 2022
August	34.5 °C (94.1 °F)	3 August 1990
September	30.4 °C (86.7 °F)	1 September 1906
October	25.9 °C (78.6 °F)	1 October 2011
November	18.7 °C (65.7 °F)	2 November 2005
December	15.8 °C (60.4 °F)	8 December 1998

==== Lowest daily temperatures ====
Period	Record temperature	Date
January	−13.1 °C (8.4 °F)	24 January 1881
February	−11.3 °C (11.7 °F)	6 February 1895
March	−7.2 °C (19.0 °F)	2 March 1965
April	−5.6 °C (21.9 °F)	10 April 2003
May	−1.7 °C (28.9 °F)	6 May 2012
June	2.5 °C (36.5 °F)	5 June 1872
July	6.6 °C (43.9 °F)	3 July 1877
August	3.1 °C (37.6 °F)	30 August 2003
September	1.7 °C (35.1 °F)	18 September 1919; 22 September 2012
October	−2.9 °C (26.8 °F)	27 October 1895
November	−7.5 °C (18.5 °F)	29 November 2010
December	−17.6 °C (0.3 °F)	21 December 2010

== Precipitation ==
Rainfall is fairly regular throughout the year in Liverpool, with no wet or dry season as a result of its oceanic climate. All records refer to the Bidston Observatory from 1867 to 2002 and Crosby from then on.

=== Averages ===
Climate data for Crosby, elevation: 30 m (98 ft), 1981–2010 normals
Month	Jan	Feb	Mar	Apr	May	Jun	Jul	Aug	Sep	Oct	Nov	Dec	Year
Average precipitation mm (inches)	74.9 (2.95)	54.4 (2.14)	63.6 (2.50)	54.3 (2.14)	54.9 (2.16)	66.2 (2.61)	59.0 (2.32)	68.9 (2.71)	71.7 (2.82)	97.3 (3.83)	82.6 (3.25)	88.8 (3.50)	836.6 (32.94)
Average precipitation days (≥ 1.0 mm)	13.8	10.7	12.5	10.4	10.6	10.5	10.1	11.2	11.5	14.8	14.6	13.9	144.3
Source 1: Met Office
Source 2: National Oceanography Centre

Climate data for Liverpool Docks, elevation: 41 ft (12 m), 1772–1799 normals
Month	Jan	Feb	Mar	Apr	May	Jun	Jul	Aug	Sep	Oct	Nov	Dec	Year
Average precipitation mm (inches)	54.3 (2.14)	48.3 (1.90)	36.4 (1.43)	46.7 (1.84)	61.9 (2.44)	74.3 (2.93)	79.0 (3.11)	91.8 (3.61)	89.2 (3.51)	90.7 (3.57)	82.6 (3.25)	60.6 (2.39)	815.8 (32.12)
Source: Met Office

=== Extremes ===
==== Lowest ====
Period	Record rainfall	Year
Year	480.5 millimetres (18.92 in)	1991
Spring (March–May)	67.1 millimetres (2.64 in)	1883
Summer (June–August)	37.5 millimetres (1.48 in)	1995
Autumn (September–November)	107.6 millimetres (4.24 in)	1922
Winter (December–February)	31.5 millimetres (1.24 in)	1963/1964
January	3.8 millimetres (0.15 in)	1997
February	0.9 millimetres (0.035 in)	1932
March	6.4 millimetres (0.25 in)	1931
April	2.7 millimetres (0.11 in)	1980
May	4.0 millimetres (0.16 in)	2020
June	1.6 millimetres (0.063 in)	1925
July	6.0 millimetres (0.24 in)	1868
August	2.6 millimetres (0.10 in)	1976
September	7.2 millimetres (0.28 in)	1959
October	8.0 millimetres (0.31 in)	1922
November	4.8 millimetres (0.19 in)	1945
December	7.9 millimetres (0.31 in)	1936

==== Highest ====
Period	Record rainfall	Year
Year	1,159.9 millimetres (45.67 in)	1872
Spring (March–May)	278.6 millimetres (10.97 in)	1969
Summer (June–August)	380.4 millimetres (14.98 in)	1956
Autumn (September–November)	405.5 millimetres (15.96 in)	1872
Winter (December–February)	274.0 millimetres (10.79 in)	1993/1994
January	145.5 millimetres (5.73 in)	1948
February	143.6 millimetres (5.65 in)	2020
March	133.2 millimetres (5.24 in)	1998
April	104.4 millimetres (4.11 in)	1998
May	170.2 millimetres (6.70 in)	1969
June	154.0 millimetres (6.06 in)	2007
July	190.8 millimetres (7.51 in)	1872
August	221.2 millimetres (8.71 in)	1956
September	204.3 millimetres (8.04 in)	1976
October	187.2 millimetres (7.37 in)	1903
November	160.8 millimetres (6.33 in)	1951
December	165.8 millimetres (6.53 in)	2015

== Sunshine ==
Records of sunshine were kept at Bidston from 1908 to 2002. The station at Crosby does not report sunshine data. The closest station that does so now is Hawarden, Flintshire, 25 miles (40 km) away.

Climate data for Bidston, 1971–2000
Month	Jan	Feb	Mar	Apr	May	Jun	Jul	Aug	Sep	Oct	Nov	Dec	Year
Mean monthly sunshine hours	56.0	70.3	105.1	154.2	207.0	191.5	197.0	175.2	132.7	97.3	65.8	46.8	1,499.1
Source 1: Met Office
Source 2: National Oceanography Centre

=== Extremes ===
==== Highest ====
Period	Record	Year
Year	1883.0 hours	1995
Spring (March–May)	631.7 hours	1909
Summer (June–August)	777.5 hours	1995
Autumn (September–November)	380.8 hours	1975
Winter (December–February)	246.3 hours	1909–10
January	88.1 hours	1910
February	109.3 hours	1949 (Note: Hawarden exceeded this value in 2019, with 114.6 hours.)
March	179.9 hours	1929
April	227.8 hours	1909
May	305.6 hours	1989
June	298.8 hours	1960
July	298.8 hours	1955
August	273.3 hours	1995
September	176.2 hours	1986
October	136.6 hours	1995
November	91.7 hours	1975
December	72.0 hours	1960 (Note: Hawarden exceeded this value in 2014, with 84.3 hours.)

==== Lowest ====
Period	Record	Year
Year	1250.9 hours	1912
Spring (March–May)	342.3 hours	1983
Summer (June–August)	390.0 hours	1912 and 1978
Autumn (September–November)	219.9 hours	1936
Winter (December–February)	94.6 hours	1943–44
January	18.1 hours	1950
February	24.8 hours	1940
March	53.7 hours	1942
April	77.3 hours	1920
May	121.5 hours	1932
June	111.3 hours	1987
July	105.1 hours	1944
August	100.7 hours	1912
September	81.1 hours	1976
October	56.0 hours	1915
November	26.9 hours	1951
December	16.5 hours	1927

== Wind ==
The mean yearly wind speed at 10m in Liverpool is 13.6 miles per hour (11.8 kn).

=== Averages ===
Period	Mean wind speed at 10m
Annual	13.6 mph (11.8 kn)
January	15.5 mph (13.5 kn)
February	15.3 mph (13.3 kn)
March	14.6 mph (12.7 kn)
April	12.8 mph (11.1 kn)
May	12.2 mph (10.6 kn)
June	12.8 mph (11.1 kn)
July	13.5 mph (11.7 kn)
August	9.9 mph (8.6 kn)
September	13.2 mph (11.5 kn)
October	13.8 mph (12.0 kn)
November	14.5 mph (12.6 kn)
December	14.3 mph (12.4 kn)

=== Daily Extremes ===
Highest wind gusts reported in each month of the year.

Period	Maximum Gusts	Date
January	101 mph (88 kn)	29 January 1938
February	96 mph (83 kn)	26 February 1990
March	98 mph (85 kn)	27 March 1966
April	84 mph (73 kn)	23 April 1947
May	86 mph (75 kn)	22 May 1966
June	71 mph (62 kn)	5 June 1946
July	69 mph (60 kn)	30 July 1946
August	77 mph (67 kn)	20 August 1934; 25 August 1957
September	83 mph (72 kn)	20 September 1981
October	96 mph (83 kn)	4 October 1938
November	98 mph (85 kn)	6 November 1952
December	94 mph (82 kn)	6 December 1940

=== Monthly Extremes ===
Average monthly windspeed

Period	Highest mean windspeed	Year	Lowest mean windspeed	Year
January	22.3 mph (19.4 kn)	2007	3.7 mph (5.9 km/h)	1992
February	23.5 mph (20.4 kn)	2020	5.9 mph (5.1 kn)	2001
March	19.6 mph (17.0 kn)	1967	5.9 mph (5.1 kn)	2001
April	17.3 mph (15.0 kn)	1942	5.9 mph (5.1 kn)	1952/1981
May	16.1 mph (14.0 kn)	2015	5.1 mph (4.4 kn)	1952/2001
June	13.7 mph (11.9 kn)	1938/1956	5.1 mph (4.4 kn)	1988
July	14.8 mph (12.9 kn)	1953	4.7 mph (4.1 kn)	2001
August	16.3 mph (14.2 kn)	2014	4.4 mph (3.8 kn)	1945/2001
September	15.8 mph (13.7 kn)	2012	4.1 mph (3.6 kn)	1959
October	17.5 mph (15.2 kn)	2017	5.8 mph (5.0 kn)	1945
November	20.0 mph (17.4 kn)	2015	3.7 mph (3.2 kn)	1945
December	22.9 mph (19.9 kn)	2011	6.8 mph (5.9 kn)	1989
Year	14.0 mph (12.2 kn)	2011	6.2 mph (5.4 kn)	2001

== Climatic data ==
Climate data for Crosby (Note: Weather station is located 7 miles (11 km) from the Liverpool city centre.) WMO ID: 03316; coordinates 53°29′50″N 3°03′28″W; elevation: 30 m (98 ft); 1991–2020 normals, (Note: Sunshine hours were recorded at the Bidston Observatory from the period of 1971–2000.) (Note: Humidity was recorded at the Bidston Observatory for the period of 1975–June 2002. The period Jul–Sep 1992 has no record, with Jan–May 2001 reporting unreliabe data.) extremes 1867–present (Note: From 1867–2002, extremes were recorded at the Bidston Observatory in Wirral. Since 1983, extremes were recorded at Crosby, Sefton.)
Month	Jan	Feb	Mar	Apr	May	Jun	Jul	Aug	Sep	Oct	Nov	Dec	Year
Record high °C (°F)	15.1 (59.2)	18.9 (66.0)	21.2 (70.2)	24.6 (76.3)	28.2 (82.8)	30.7 (87.3)	35.5 (95.9)	34.5 (94.1)	30.4 (86.7)	25.9 (78.6)	18.7 (65.7)	15.8 (60.4)	35.5 (95.9)
Mean daily maximum °C (°F)	7.5 (45.5)	7.9 (46.2)	9.9 (49.8)	12.8 (55.0)	15.9 (60.6)	18.4 (65.1)	20.0 (68.0)	19.7 (67.5)	17.7 (63.9)	14.2 (57.6)	10.5 (50.9)	8.0 (46.4)	13.6 (56.5)
Daily mean °C (°F)	5.2 (41.4)	5.3 (41.5)	6.9 (44.4)	9.2 (48.6)	12.1 (53.8)	14.9 (58.8)	16.7 (62.1)	16.6 (61.9)	14.5 (58.1)	11.4 (52.5)	8.1 (46.6)	5.6 (42.1)	10.5 (50.9)
Mean daily minimum °C (°F)	2.8 (37.0)	2.7 (36.9)	3.9 (39.0)	5.6 (42.1)	8.3 (46.9)	11.3 (52.3)	13.5 (56.3)	13.5 (56.3)	11.2 (52.2)	8.5 (47.3)	5.7 (42.3)	3.1 (37.6)	7.5 (45.5)
Record low °C (°F)	−13.1 (8.4)	−11.3 (11.7)	−8.6 (16.5)	−5.6 (21.9)	−1.7 (28.9)	1.0 (33.8)	5.0 (41.0)	3.1 (37.6)	1.7 (35.1)	−2.9 (26.8)	−7.5 (18.5)	−17.6 (0.3)	−17.6 (0.3)
Average precipitation mm (inches)	69.4 (2.73)	57.1 (2.25)	53.3 (2.10)	49.8 (1.96)	52.5 (2.07)	64.4 (2.54)	65.5 (2.58)	72.1 (2.84)	76.6 (3.02)	89.7 (3.53)	82.2 (3.24)	91.9 (3.62)	824.3 (32.45)
Average precipitation days (≥ 1.0 mm)	13.8	11.5	11.3	10.0	9.8	10.4	11.0	12.2	11.8	14.4	15.5	15.4	146.9
Average snowy days	6	5	4	2	0	0	0	0	0	0	1	4	22
Average relative humidity (%)	85.1	83.5	80.7	77.9	76.6	78.9	79.0	80.1	81.9	84.6	85.1	85.6	80.8
Mean monthly sunshine hours	56.0	70.3	105.1	154.2	207.0	191.5	197.0	175.2	132.7	97.3	65.8	46.8	1,499.1
Mean daily daylight hours	8.2	9.9	11.9	14.1	15.9	16.9	16.4	14.7	12.7	10.5	8.6	7.6	12.3
Average ultraviolet index	0	1	2	4	5	6	6	5	4	2	1	0	3
Source 1: Met Office
Source 2: National Oceanography Centre WeatherAtlas CEDA Archive
