= Proudman Oceanographic Laboratory =

English research laboratory

Coordinates: 53°24′27.5″N 2°58′8.2″W

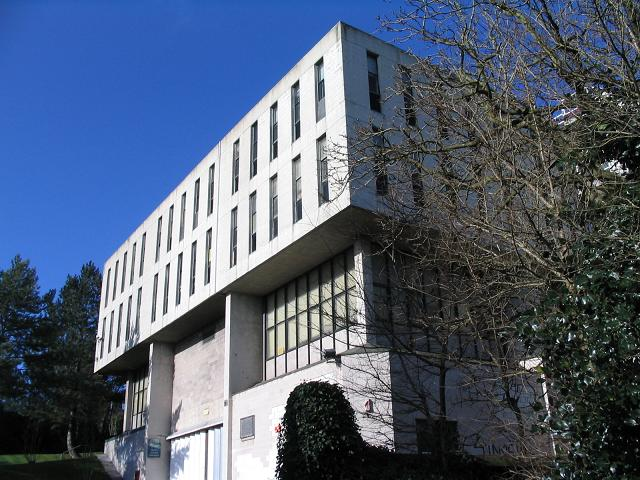
A former home of POL, built at Bidston, west of Liverpool, in 1975 and used until around 2004. Demolished 2013.

The former Proudman Oceanographic Laboratory (POL) is based in Brownlow Street, Liverpool, England. In April 2010, POL merged with the National Oceanography Centre, Southampton (NOCS) to form the National Oceanography Centre. The Liverpool laboratory's scientific research focuses on oceanography encompassing global sea-levels and geodesy, numerical modelling of continental shelf seas and coastal sediment processes. This research alongside activities of surveying, monitoring, data management and forecasting provides strategic support for the wider mission of the Natural Environment Research Council.

A leading world centre in tidal prediction (with related interests in earth tides and storm surges) and a leading European centre in modelling and forecasting shelf sea dynamics, it is home to the Coastal Observatory in Liverpool Bay; the National Tidal and Sea Level Facility, the Permanent Service for Mean Sea Level and the British Oceanographic Data Centre.

== History of tidal measurements ==
The history of tidal measurements taken at Liverpool starts with Jeremiah Horrocks (1619–1641) who was born and died at Toxteth. While he is most famous for predicting, and then observing, the transit of Venus in 1639 at Much Hoole near Preston, he also had a great interest in understanding ocean tides, and in particular in verifying that tidal changes were closely related to variations in the Moon's orbit. Shortly before his death, he is known to have made measurements of high waters (probably the times and perhaps also the heights of high tide) on the Mersey coast near his home for at least a month. Unfortunately, his tidal measurements (but not his astronomical records) were lost in the civil war or possibly in the Fire of London.

William Hutchinson (1716–1801) compiled the first extended set of sea level measurements in the UK, together with a comprehensive set of meteorological information. He established the Bidston Lighthouse in 1771. His measurements of the heights and times of every high water during 1764–1793 at the Liverpool Old Dock were of high quality and are still being used in scientific research today. Hutchinson's measurements of the tides during 1764–1767 were used by Richard and George Holden to derive the first reliable publicly accessible tide tables in the UK, first published in 1770 for over 200 years.

To mark Liverpool 2007 and 2008, POL together with colleagues at Brock University, Canada will produce a CD containing copies of all Hutchinson's tidal and meteorological data sets and background information on his life.

=== 19th century ===
During the 19th century, the Mersey Docks and Harbour Board (MDHB) established a network of a dozen state-of-the-art sea level stations along the River Mersey, Dee and neighbouring coasts. They were used to provide the best possible tidal information to what became one of the most important ports in the British Empire, together with data for surveying and coastal engineering. The main Liverpool gauges were at George’s Pier, the present-day Pier Head, then Prince's Pier next to the ocean liner landing stage and now Gladstone Dock. Together these sites have provided data which make up the longest UK sea level record and one of the longest in the world. These data have been used to study long term changes in mean sea levels and in the sea level extreme levels which often result in flooding.

In 1845, the MDHB established the Liverpool Observatory at Waterloo Dock, Liverpool to provide all the tidal, meteorological and astronomical information required by ship owners.

In 1866, the expanding port resulted in the Observatory being relocated in 1866 to Bidston Hill on the Wirral, where Hutchinson had established Bidston Lighthouse in 1771. It was built with sandstone from excavating the deep cellars.

=== 20th century ===
In 1929, the Liverpool Observatory was merged with the Liverpool University Tidal Institute and its work became more focused on scientific research, rather than port operations. This combined institute (with a number of name changes and official owners) was to become a world-famous centre for sea level and tidal research with three Fellows of the Royal Society among its Directors: Joseph Proudman, Arthur Doodson and David Cartwright.

The Institute concentrated on sea level monitoring and prediction around UK coasts, and indeed on understanding sea level changes worldwide: In 1933, the Permanent Service for Mean Sea Level was established at Bidston by Proudman and remains important. Such understanding informs government departments on policies for coastal protection, and contributes to international scientific study groups such as those of the Intergovernmental Panel on Climate Change. The tide can be predicted at any location around the UK with several centimetre accuracy. Superimposed upon the astronomical tide, which is caused by the gravitational attraction of the Moon and Sun, is the storm surge caused by strong winds and low air pressures.

In 1953, the major flood at Sea Palling and other parts of the north Norfolk Coast resulted from a large storm surge occurring at high tide. This disaster led to the development of the UK National Tide Gauge Network and the UK Storm Tide Forecasting System. The Institute led the development of computer models to predict UK storm surges several days ahead based on forecast weather information. Routine surge forecasts are now produced by the Met Office and result in flood warnings issued by the Environment Agency.

In 1965, the Liverpool Tidal Institute became part of the Natural Environment Research Council. In 1970 it fused with the National Institute of Oceanography to form the Institute of Oceanographic Sciences.

In 1979, a new building right next to the Observatory for staff and a computer mainframe was opened and named after Joseph Proudman; in 2004 it relocated to a new building at the University of Liverpool and the Proudman building on Bidston Hill was torn down in 2012. In 1987, the Liverpool Tidal Institute was renamed the Proudman Oceanographic Laboratory.

=== 21st century ===
In 2004, it moved from Bidston to the campus of Liverpool University with sea level science, shelf sea science and numerical modelling of ocean processes as the three main areas of expertise of research.

== Coastal Observatory ==
POL houses the Coastal Observatory in Liverpool Bay. Its objective is to study a typical coastal sea's response both to natural forces and to the effects of human activity. The Observatory integrates real-time data measurements with data from models into a "pre-operational coastal prediction system" whose results will be displayed on the web. The concept is founded on obtaining data in real time, using telemetry, sending the data from underwater to the sea surface, to land, to POL's web site, enabling what is often known as 'armchair oceanography'.

=== Measurements ===
The aim of the Coastal Observatory is to build a time series of data. The Observatory has a particular interest in such areas as storm surges, seasonality, and variations in river discharge, with an emphasis on the River Mersey. August 2007 marked five years of continuous running of the Coastal Observatory in Liverpool Bay, taking measurements such as:

- In situ time series of current, temperature, and salinity profiles and of waves and weather. A second site, and measurements of turbidity and chlorophyll are now also operational.
- The CEFAS SmartBuoy for surface properties including nutrients and chlorophyll.
- Instrumented ferries for near surface temperature, salinity, turbidity, chlorophyll, and later, nutrient data. The first route was Liverpool to Douglas (Isle of Man), with the ferry travelling between Birkenhead (Wirral) and Dublin (Ireland)
- Drifters measure surface currents and properties such as temperature and salinity.
- Tide gauges, with sensors for meteorological, waves, temperature, and salinity data, where appropriate.
- Meteorological data from HF radar and tide gauge sites.
- Shore-base HF radar measures waves and surface currents out to a range of 50 km.
- Satellite data - infra-red (for sea surface temperature) and visible (for chlorophyll and suspended sediment) spectra.

== See also ==
- North West Shelf Operational Oceanographic System
- Liverpool Knowledge Quarter
