= NOCL =

NOCL may refer to:

- Proudman Oceanographic Laboratory
- NOCl, the chemical formula for Nitrosyl chloride

NOCL- Nagarjuna Oil Corporation Limited
