= Philip Woodworth =

British oceanographer

Philip Leslie Woodworth MBE is a British oceanographer based at the National Oceanography Centre. His research interests include sea level variation, climatology, and the global development of sea level monitoring networks.

== Early life and education ==
Woodworth studied for a degree in Physics at Durham University (Hatfield College), graduating in 1970. He went on to complete a doctorate at the University of Birmingham in 1974.

== Career ==
Woodworth's initial training was in particle physics and early in his career he spent some time based at CERN. He has been associated with the National Oceanography Centre (formerly the Proudman Oceanographic Laboratory) since 1983.

From 1987 to 2007 Woodworth was the Director of the Permanent Service for Mean Sea Level – the global data bank for recording sea-level change. His role involved working with the Environment Agency to provide tidal analysis for UK coastal waters. He has worked closely with the IPCC, and was the lead author on the sea-level chapter for the second and third assessment reports. In 2005, he challenged the views of Nils-Axel Mörner, arguing that rising sea levels do pose a genuine threat to the future of The Maldives. In 2010, he completed research in the Falkland Islands which found that sea level around the islands had risen significantly since the mid-19th century, with the rate of rise accelerating in recent decades.

Woodworth was awarded the Vening Meinesz Medal of the European Geosciences Union in 2010 and received an MBE in the 2011 New Year Honours.

== Bibliography ==
- Church, John A.; Woodworth, Philip L.; Aarup, Thorkild; Wilson, W. Stanley, eds. (2010). Understanding Sea-Level Rise and Variability. Wiley-Blackwell. ISBN 9781444334517.
- Pugh, David; Woodworth, Philip (2014). Sea-Level Science: Understanding Tides, Surges, Tsunamis and Mean Sea-Level Changes (2nd ed.). Cambridge University Press. ISBN 9781107028197.

== See also ==
- David Thomas Pugh – English marine scientist (1943–2022)
