= Ocean data standards =

The vast scale of the oceans, the difficulty and expense of making measurements due to the hostility of the environment and the internationality of the marine environment has led to a culture of data sharing in the oceanographic data community. As far back as 1961 UNESCO's Intergovernmental Oceanographic Commission (IOC) set up IODE (International Oceanographic Data Exchange, subsequently renamed International Oceanographic Data and Information Exchange to reflect the increasing importance of metadata) to enhance marine research, exploitation and development by facilitating the exchange of oceanographic data and information.

Traditionally, oceanographic data exchange was based on manual transactions involving delivery of physical packages of data on magnetic tape, CD-ROM or more recently by electronic FTP transfer. However, the increasing need of climate scientists for regional or global data syntheses to support their modelling activities requires automation of the data exchange process. Consequently, oceanographic data managers are developing 'virtual data centres' to support the distribution of data through software agents.

Distributed data systems are critically dependent on machine-readable metadata to provide information on such issues as physical access protocols and semantics of the data. It is essential that this metadata conforms to agreed standards to prevent the computing paradigm of 'garbage in, garbage out' blighting automated data exchange. For example if a data description of 'temperature' were allowed it could lead to the merging of sea temperature data from one centre with air temperature data from another.

Many of these standards are community based, such as the CF conventions developed for global climate modelling. Significant progress documenting these informal standards leading to exposure and encouragement of best practice has been made by the Marine Metadata Interoperability project.

However, if the oceanographic community is to emulate the success of the spatial data community in the development of data interoperability then a more formalised standards development framework is required. To this end an ocean data standards review, development and publication infrastructure is being developed under the auspices of the Joint WMO-IOC Technical Commission on Oceanography and Marine Meteorology (JCOMM).
