= Global Sea Level Observing System =

Program to measure global sea levels

Established in 1985, The Global Sea Level Observing System (GLOSS) is an Intergovernmental Oceanographic Commission (IOC) program whose purpose is to measure sea level globally for long-term climate change studies. The program's purpose has changed since the 2004 Indian Ocean earthquake and the program now collects real time measurements of sea level. The project is currently upgrading the over 290 stations it currently runs, so that they can send real time data via satellite to newly set up national tsunami centres. They are also fitting the stations with solar panels so they can continue to operate even if the mains power supply is interrupted by severe weather. The Global Sea Level Observing System does not compete with Deep-ocean Assessment and Reporting of Tsunamis as most GLOSS transducers are located close to land masses while DART's transducers are far out in the ocean.

The concept for GLOSS was proposed to the IOC by oceanographers David Pugh and Klaus Wyrtki in order to develop the Permanent Service for Mean Sea Level (PSMSL) data bank. The PSMSL states that "GLOSS provides oversight and coordination for global and regional sea level networks in support of, and with direction from, the oceanographic and climate research communities."

The Global Sea Level Observation System utilizes 290 tide gauge stations and watches over 90 countries and territories to have a global coverage. The research that is provided by GLOSS is important for many things including research into sea level change and ocean circulation, coastal protection during events such as storm surges, providing flood warning and monitoring tsunamis, tide tables for port operations, fishermen, and recreation, to define datums for national or state boundaries.

GLOSS Core Network The operation and maintenance of the GLOSS Core Network fulfills a range of research and operational requirements for the GLOSS Network. The goal of this network is to be 100% effective. Each gauge that is placed may differ in some aspects, in terms of having its own way of gathering and recording data.
