= Klaus Wyrtki =

American oceanographer

Klaus Wyrtki (February 7, 1925 – February 5, 2013) was an American physical oceanographer.

Born in Tarnowskie Góry, Upper Silesia, Poland, in 1925, from 1945 to 1948 Wyrtki attended the University of Marburg in Germany, and received his Ph.D. from the University of Kiel in 1950. He was a professor at Scripps Institution of Oceanography until 1964, when he became a member of the faculty of the Department of Oceanography at the University of Hawaiʻi at Mānoa. From 1993 he was an emeritus professor.

Wyrtki worked on understanding and forecasting El Nino. He established a tidal gauge network, gave an explanation for the Pacific oxygen minimum zone under the thermocline, and discovered the ocean current jet that now bears his name, the "Wyrtki Jet". He is also known for his work on thermohaline circulation. Along with British oceanographer David Pugh, Wyrtki proposed and established the Global Sea Level Observing System (GLOSS), a program of the Intergovernmental Oceanographic Commission.

Wyrtki died on February 5, 2013, in Honolulu, Hawaii. He was survived by his wife, Erika; his son, Oliver; his daughter, Undine; and three grandchildren.

== Awards and honors ==
In 1991, Wyrtki was awarded the Sverdrup Gold Medal Award by the American Meteorological Society, for "outstanding contributions to the dynamics of ocean currents, especially the Gulf Stream". In 2003, Wyrtki was awarded the Prince Albert I Medal. In 2004, he was awarded the Alexander Agassiz Medal of the National Academy of Sciences "for fundamental contributions to the understanding of the oceanic general circulation of abyssal and thermocline waters and for providing the intellectual underpinning for our understanding of ENSO (El Niño)". H

He also has been awarded the Rosenstiel Award from the Rosenstiel School of Marine, Atmospheric, and Earth Science at the University of Miami, the Albert Defant Medal of the German Meteorological Society, and the Maurice Ewing Medal from the American Geophysical Union. In 2007, he was elected a Fellow of the American Academy of Arts & Sciences. A research vessel at the University of Hawaiʻi is named in his honor.

According to friend and colleague Axel Timmermann, Wyrtki "was really one of the two or three greatest oceanographers of all time, I think. Without him we wouldn't do El Nino forecasting on a regular basis. Without him perhaps we wouldn't understand the effects of global warming on sea level tides. He made some amazing contributions to science and society."
