= RV Callista =

British oceanographic research vessel

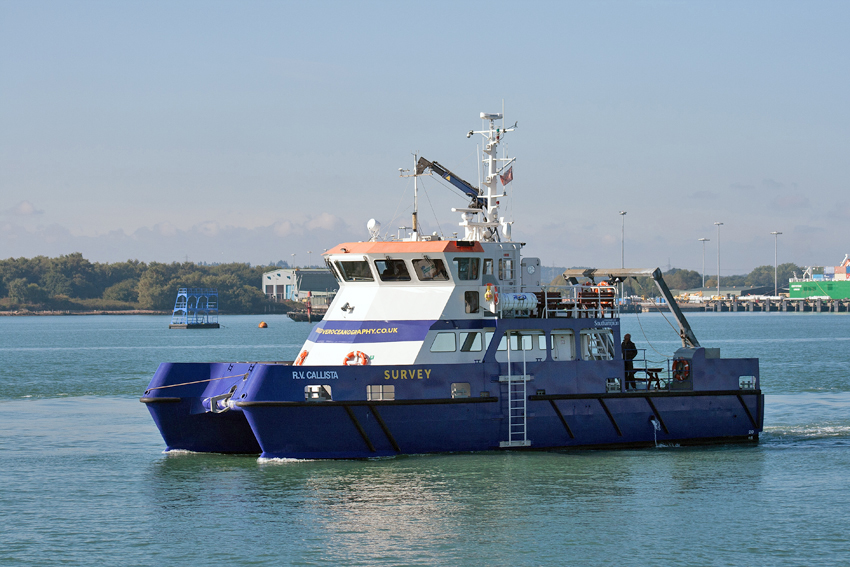

History
- Owner: School of Ocean and Earth Science; University of Southampton
- Port of registry: (United Kingdom) Southampton
- Builder: Tyovene Oy, Finland
- Cost: £1,000,000
- In service: 2005
- Identification: MMSI number: 235028893
- Status: In service

General characteristics
- Type: Research vessel
- Tonnage: 50 GT
- Length: 19.75 m (64 ft 10 in)
- Beam: 7.40 m (24 ft 3 in)
- Draught: 1.80 m (5 ft 11 in)
- Installed power: 2 x Scania D12 diesels
- Propulsion: Twin propellers
- Speed: 14 kn (26 km/h; 16 mph)
- Capacity: Max 36 passengers
- Crew: 3/4

RV Callista is a research vessel belonging to the University of Southampton's School of Ocean and Earth Science, based at the National Oceanography Centre, Southampton. Callista is a 19.75-metre (64 ft 10 in) catamaran designed and equipped for a range of coastal and shelf research.

Callista's main function is to provide seatime for students on courses run by the university and the NOCS. In addition she is available for hire to commercial customers for up to six weeks a year.

== Facilities ==
The vessel is fitted with a 4 t (4.4 tons) A frame and associated winch, a 1.3 t (1.4 tons) crane, a moonpool and facilities for diving operations. She carries a variety of sensors as standard and is equipped with both wet and dry laboratories. Propulsion is by twin Scania D12 diesel engines giving a service speed of 10 kn (19 km/h; 12 mph) and a maximum speed of 14 kn (26 km/h; 16 mph). She is also fitted with bow thrusters for enhanced manouvrability.
