= John Shepherd (earth scientist) =

British scientist (born 1946)

- Born: John Graham Shepherd; 24 August 1946 (age 80); Croydon, United Kingdom
- Education: University of Cambridge (BA, PhD)
- Awards: Fellow of the IMA (1989); Chartered Mathematician of the IMA (1991); Fellow of the Royal Society (1999); Commander of the Most Excellent Order of the British Empire (2010)
- Scientific career
- Fields: Physical oceanographer
- Workplaces: National Oceanography Centre, Southampton (NOCS); Cavendish Laboratory
- Thesis: The proximity effect in superconducting/normal sandwiches (1971)
- Doctoral advisor: Brian Pippard
- Website: jgshepherd.com; www.southampton.ac.uk/oes/about/staff/jgs1.page

John Graham Shepherd (born 1946) CBE FRS is a British Earth system scientist, Emeritus Professor at University of Southampton, and a former director of the National Oceanography Centre, Southampton. He has worked on a wide range of environment-related topics, including the transport of chemical tracers in the atmospheric boundary layer and in the deep ocean, the management of marine fish stocks, and the dynamics of the Earth system. More recently he led a comprehensive review of geoengineering for the Royal Society.

== Early life and education ==
Shepherd was born in 1946 in Croydon in south London, and attended Dr Challoner's Grammar School, a grammar school in Amersham, Buckinghamshire. He studied Natural Sciences at Pembroke College, Cambridge, initially taking physics, mathematics, chemistry and crystallography before specialising and graduating in theoretical physics in 1967. He remained at Cambridge for doctoral studies in the Cavendish Laboratory supervised by Brian Pippard on superconductivity. He completed his doctorate in 1971 with a thesis on superconductivity. During his time at Cambridge, Shepherd also competed for Pembroke College on the British quiz show University Challenge as part of a team that included the Australian essayist, Clive James.

== Career ==
Immediately following his doctoral studies, Shepherd took a research position with the Central Electricity Generating Board to study atmospheric physics and air pollution. In 1974, he moved to the Ministry of Agriculture, Fisheries and Food (MAFF) to undertake research into the marine disposal of radioactive waste. In 1976, his research within MAFF changed direction towards mathematical modelling of fishing fleet operations and fish population dynamics, a focus which continued until the 1990s. During 1978–1979, Shepherd first became a visiting researcher at Lamont–Doherty Earth Observatory (LDEO) of Columbia University, a sabbatical activity that he later returned to in 1999. Through the 1980s, he rose through the ranks of MAFF, ultimately reaching the position of deputy director in 1989, a role in which he was tasked with the assessment and management of fish stocks, and directly provided advice to MAFF Ministers. During this period, Shepherd also served in a succession of International Council for the Exploration of the Sea (ICES) working groups and advisory committees on fisheries matters.

In 1994, Shepherd left MAFF to become the first director of the National Oceanography Centre, Southampton, then known as the Southampton Oceanography Centre, in the Hampshire city of Southampton. The creation of this centre brought together the Natural Environment Research Council's National Institute of Oceanography (NIO) and the University of Southampton's School of Ocean and Earth Science (SOES) into a single, purpose-built facility, located within the dock area of the city. During his tenure as director, 1994–1999, Shepherd served, in part, to bring together these two formerly separate organisations into a single collaborative institution. At the conclusion of his term as director, Shepherd became Professor of Marine Sciences within the University of Southampton as well as director of the Earth System Modelling Initiative (1999–2006). From 2006, he assumed a part-time role as a professorial research fellow in Earth System Science at Southampton. In parallel, Shepherd became deputy director of the Tyndall Centre for Climate Change Research (2000–2010), and began annual visits to LDEO as an adjunct senior research scientist (1999–).

Shepherd has served as the member or chair of a number of committees for organisations including NERC, DEFRA, Cefas, DECC and IFREMER. These have largely centred on fisheries, but a number have concerned off-shore operation of oil and gas infrastructures, in particular technology, decommissioning and regulation. Shepherd is a current board member of the Gulf of Mexico Research Initiative, formed in the wake of the Deepwater Horizon oil spill. From 2000 to 2002, Shepherd served as president of the Challenger Society for Marine Science.

== Awards and honours ==
In 1999, Shepherd was elected a Fellow of the Royal Society, and subsequently served as member of its study into ocean acidification (2005) and as the chair of its study into geoengineering (2009). He is also a Fellow of the Institute of Mathematics and its Applications (IMA), as well as a Chartered Mathematician (1991). In 2010 was awarded Commander of the Most Excellent Order of the British Empire (CBE) for services to science.
