= UK National Tide Gauge Network =

Part of the National Tidal and Sea Level Facility

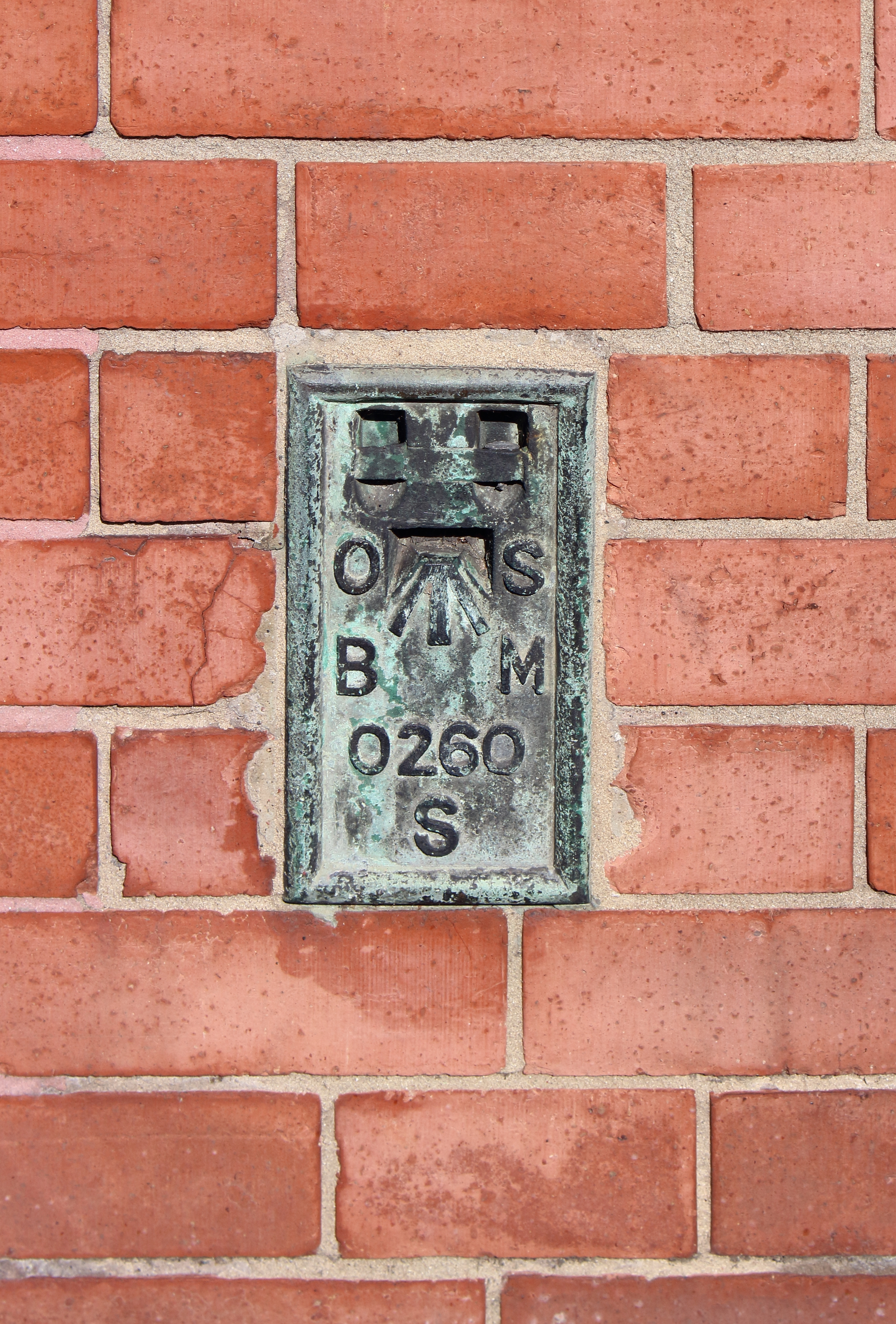
Flush bracket SO260 on the wall of Barclays Bank on Dee Lane, West Kirby. 7.8320m ASL. Also used as Tide Gauge Aux 1.

The UK National Tide Gauge Network is part of the National Tidal and Sea Level Facility. It was set up in 1953 to record sea levels around the coast of the UK, after the east coast of England was affected by severe floods.

Gauges positioned at 43 locations around the UK coast record data which is archived at the British Oceanographic Data Centre in Liverpool. Once quality controlled, this data is made available for scientific use.
