= Meteotsunami =

Tsunami-like wave of meteorological origin

A meteotsunami or meteorological tsunami is a tsunami-like sea wave of meteorological origin. Meteotsunamis are generated when rapid changes in barometric pressure cause the displacement of a body of water. In contrast to impulse-type tsunami sources, a traveling atmospheric disturbance normally interacts with the ocean over a limited period of time (from several minutes to several hours). Tsunamis and meteotsunamis are otherwise similar enough that it can be difficult to distinguish one from the other, as in cases where there is a tsunami wave but there are no records of an earthquake, landslide, or volcanic eruption. Meteotsunamis, rather, are triggered due to extreme weather events including severe thunderstorms, squalls and storm fronts; all of which can quickly change atmospheric pressure. Meteotsunamis typically occur when severe weather is moving at the same speed and direction of the local wave action towards the coastline. The size of the wave is enhanced by coastal features such as shallow continental shelves, bays and inlets.

Only about 3% of historical tsunami events (from 2000 BC through 2014) are known to have meteorological origins, although their true prevalence may be considerably higher than this because 10% of historical tsunamis have unknown origins, tsunami events in the past are often difficult to validate, and meteotsunamis may have previously been misclassified as seiche waves. Seiches are classified as a long-standing wave with longer periods and slower changes in water levels. They are also restricted to enclosed or partially enclosed basins.

== Characteristics ==
Meteotsunamis are restricted to local effects because they lack the energy available to significant seismic tsunami. However, when they are amplified by resonance they can be hazardous. Meteotsunami events can last anywhere from a few minutes to a couple of hours. Their size, length and period is heavily dependent on the speed and severity of the storm front. They are progressive waves which can affect enclosed basins and also large areas of coastline. These events have produced waves over 6 feet (1.8 m) in height and can resemble storm surge flooding.

== Frequency of events ==
In April 2019, NOAA determined that 25 meteotsunamis, on average, strike the East Coast of the United States every year. In the Great Lakes, even more of these events occur; on average, 126 times a year. In some parts of the world, they are common enough to have local names: rissaga or rissague (Catalan), ressaca or resarca (Portuguese), milgħuba (Maltese), marrobbio or marrubio (Italian), Seebär (German), sjösprång (Swedish), Sea Bar (Scots), abiki or yota (Japanese), šćiga (Croatian). Some bodies of water are more susceptible than others, including anywhere that the natural resonance frequency matches that of the waves, such as in long and narrow bays, particularly when the inlet is aligned with the oncoming wave. Examples of particularly susceptible areas include Nagasaki Bay, the eastern Adriatic Sea, and the Western Mediterranean.

== Examples of known events ==
| Area | Country | Wave height | Fatalities |
|---|---|---|---|
| Vela Luka (21 June 1978) | Croatia | 5.9 metres (19 ft) | 0 |
| Nagasaki Bay (31 March 1979) | Japan | 5 metres (16 ft) | 3 |
| Pohang Harbour | Korea | 0.8 metres (2 ft 7 in) | |
| Kent and Sussex coasts (20 July 1929) | UK | 3.5–6 metres (11–20 ft) | 2 |
| Longkou Harbour (1 September 1980) | China | 3 metres (9.8 ft) | |
| Ciutadella Harbour (15 June 2006) | Spain | 4 metres (13 ft) | |
| Gulf of Trieste | Italy | 1.5 metres (4 ft 11 in) | |
| West Sicily | Italy | 1.5 metres (4 ft 11 in) | |
| Malta | Malta | 1 metre (3 ft 3 in) | |
| Chicago (26 June 1954) | US | 3 metres (9.8 ft) | 8 |
| Daytona Beach, FL (3–4 July 1992) | US | 3.5 metres (11 ft) | 0 |
| Ciutadella Harbour & Alcudia | Spain | 1.8 metres (5 ft 11 in) | 0 |
| Barnegat Inlet (13 June 2013) | US | 1.8 | 0 |
| Tolchester Beach (6 July 2020) | US | | |
| Hanko (7 August 2023) | Finland | 0.58 metres (1 ft 11 in) | |
| Lake Michigan Beach (2 April 2021) | US | | 0 |
| Mar del Plata, Mar Chiquita and other towns (12 January 2026) | Argentina | 1.8 metres (5 ft 11 in) | 1 |
| Adella Beach in Neenah (27 July 2026) | US | ~1 metre (3 ft 3 in) | 0 |

== Other notable events ==
In 1929, a wave 6 meters (20 ft) in height pulled ten people from the shore, to their deaths in Grand Haven, Michigan. A three-meter wave that hit the Chicago waterfront in 1954 swept people off of piers, drowning seven. A meteotsunami that struck Nagasaki Bay on 31 March 1979 achieved a maximum wave height of 5 meters (16 ft); there were three fatalities. In June 2013, a derecho off the New Jersey coast triggered a widespread meteotsunami event, where tide gauges along the East Coast, Puerto Rico and Bermuda reported "tsunami-like" conditions. The peak wave amplitude was 1 foot (0.30 m) above normal sea level in Newport, Rhode Island. In New Jersey, divers were pulled over a breakwater and three people were swept off a jetty, two seriously injured, when a six-foot wave struck the Barnegat Inlet.

In June, 2025, a suspected meteotsunami occurred in Lake Superior and was videoed on the eastern side of Thunder Bay in Ontario. Canadian scientists are analyzing the data, which included water levels on the lake moving up to a meter, to determine if it was a meteotsunami, a seiche, or some other phenomenon.

== See also ==
- Deep-ocean Assessment and Reporting of Tsunamis (DART)
- List of tsunamis
- Rogue wave
- Sneaker wave
- Storm surge
- Tsunami warning system (TWS)
- Undular bore
