= Storm surge =

Rise of water associated with a low-pressure weather system

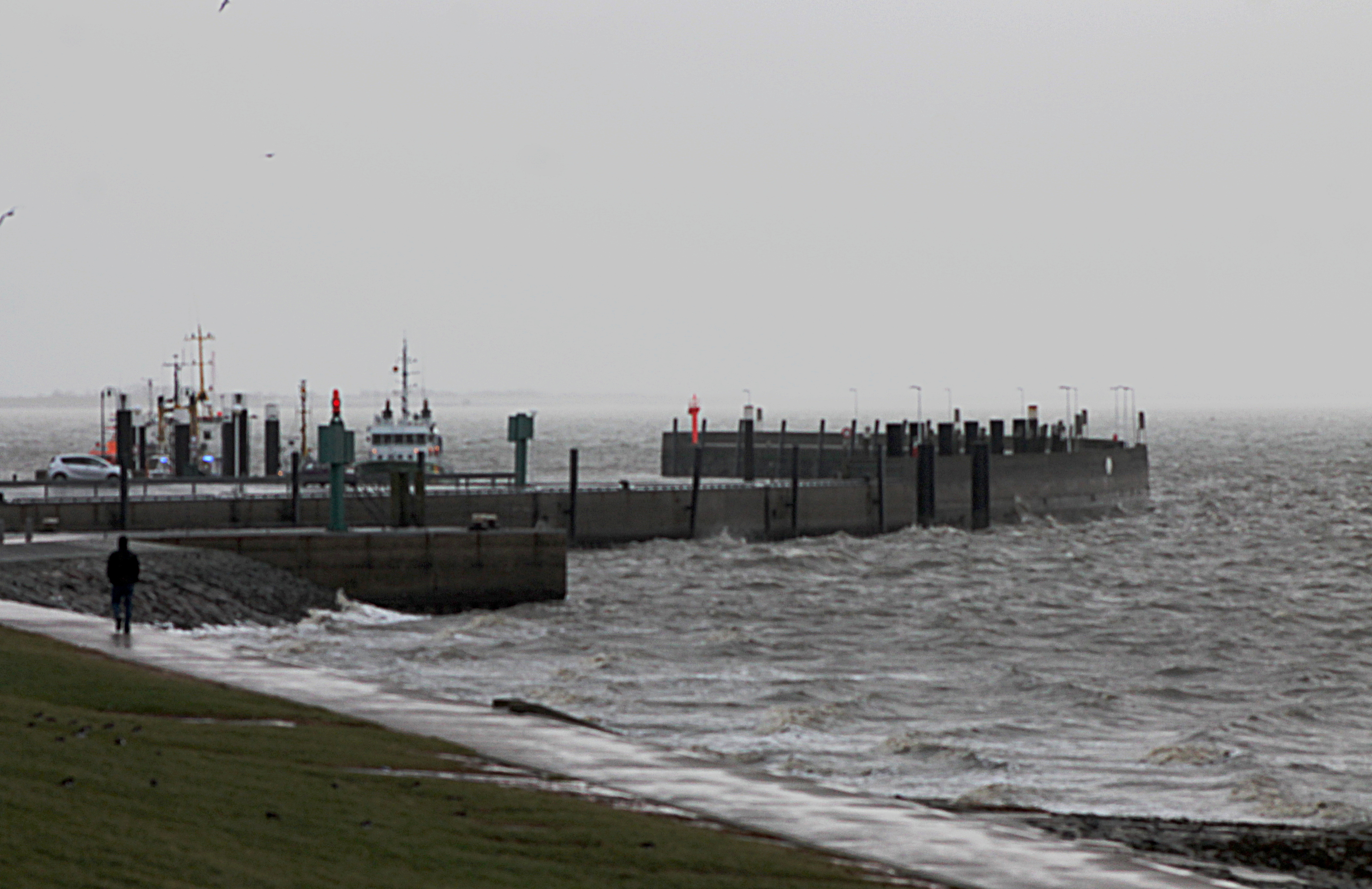
Storm surge of the North Sea on February 9, 2014, as seen on the South Beach (Südstrand) in Wilhelmshaven, Germany.

A storm surge is a coastal flood or tsunami-like phenomenon of rising water (tropical wave) commonly associated with low-pressure weather systems, such as tropical cyclones. Alternatively, it may be known as a storm flood, tidal surge, or storm tide. It is measured as the rise in water level above the normal tidal level, and does not include waves.

The main meteorological factor contributing to a storm surge is high-speed wind pushing water towards the coast over a long fetch. Other factors affecting storm surge severity include the shallowness and orientation of the water body in the storm path, the timing of tides, and the atmospheric pressure drop due to the storm.

As extreme weather becomes more intense and the sea level rises due to climate change, storm surges are expected to cause more risk to coastal populations. Communities and governments can adapt by building hard infrastructure, like flood barriers, soft infrastructure, like coastal dunes or mangroves, improving coastal construction practices and building social strategies such as early warning, education and evacuation plans.

== Mechanics ==
At least five processes can be involved in altering tide levels during storms.

=== Direct wind effect ===
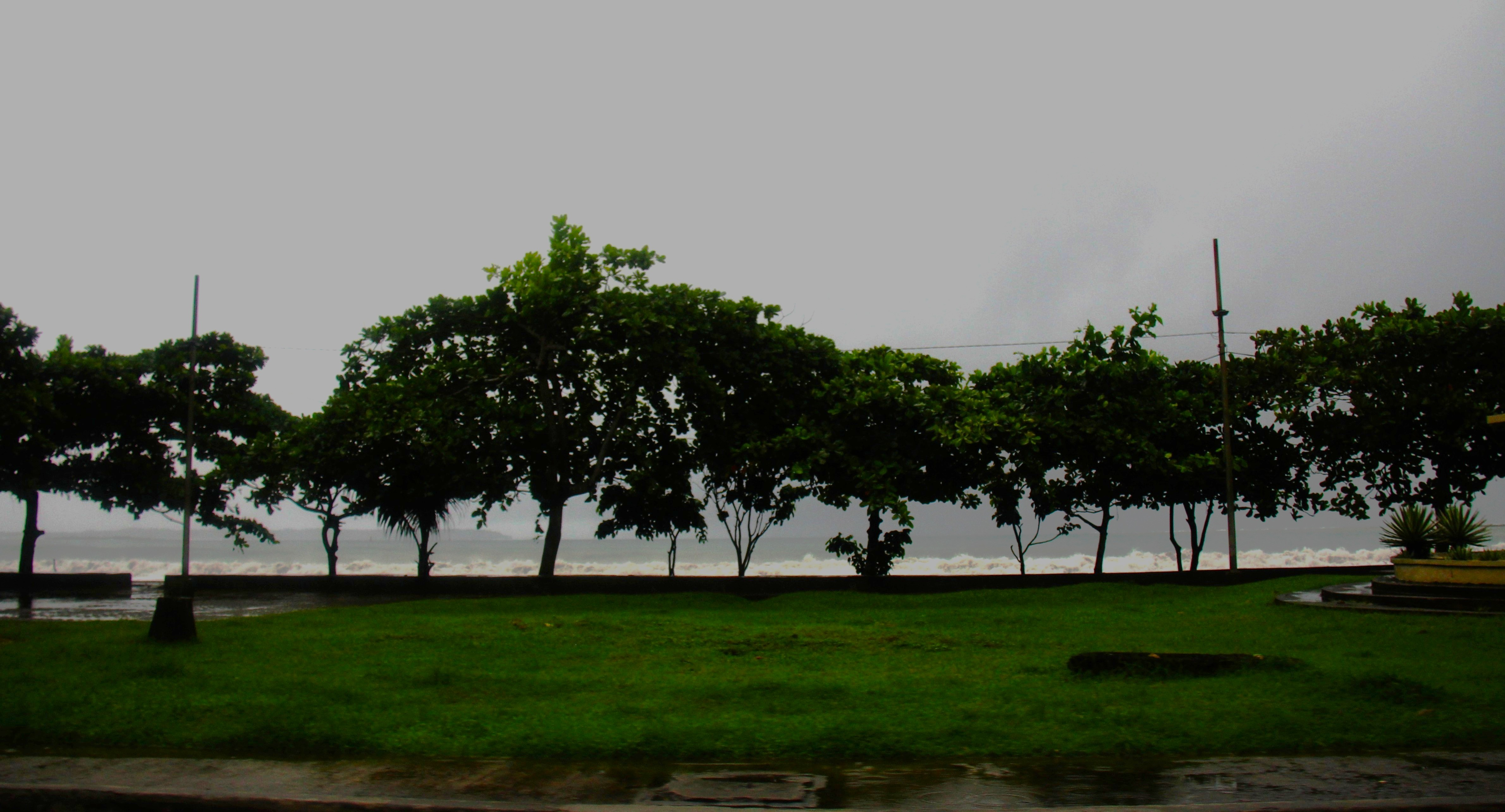
Baybay Boulevard having storm surge during Typhoon Kalmaegi (Tino) on November 3, 2025.

Wind stresses cause a phenomenon referred to as wind setup, which is the tendency for water levels to increase at the downwind shore and to decrease at the upwind shore. Intuitively, this is caused by the storm blowing the water toward one side of the basin in the direction of its winds. Strong surface winds cause surface currents at a 45° angle to the wind direction, by an effect known as the Ekman spiral. Because the Ekman spiral effects spread vertically through the water, the effect is proportional to depth. The surge will be driven into bays in the same way as the astronomical tide.

=== Atmospheric pressure effect ===
The pressure effects of a tropical cyclone will cause the water level in the open ocean to rise in regions of low atmospheric pressure and fall in regions of high atmospheric pressure. The rising water level will counteract the low atmospheric pressure such that the total pressure at some plane beneath the water surface remains constant. This effect is estimated at a 10 mm (0.39 in) increase in sea level for every millibar (hPa) drop in atmospheric pressure. For example, a major storm with a 100 millibar pressure drop would be expected to have a 1.0 m (3.3 ft) water level rise from the pressure effect.

=== Effect of the Earth's rotation ===
The Earth's rotation causes the Coriolis effect, which bends currents to the right in the Northern Hemisphere and to the left in the Southern Hemisphere. When this bend brings the currents into more perpendicular contact with the shore, it can amplify the surge, and when it bends the current away from the shore it has the effect of lessening the surge.

=== Effect of waves ===
The effect of waves, while directly powered by the wind, is distinct from a storm's wind-powered currents. Powerful wind whips up large, strong waves in the direction of its movement. Although these surface waves are responsible for very little water transport in open water, they may be responsible for significant transport near the shore. When waves are breaking on a line more or less parallel to the beach, they carry considerable water shoreward. As they break, the water moving toward the shore has considerable momentum and may run up a sloping beach to an elevation above the mean water line, which may exceed twice the wave height before breaking.

=== Rainfall effect ===
The rainfall effect is experienced predominantly in estuaries. Hurricanes may dump as much as 300 mm (12 in) of rainfall in 24 hours over large areas and higher rainfall densities in localized areas. As a result, surface runoff can quickly flood streams and rivers. This can increase the water level near the head of tidal estuaries as storm-driven waters surging in from the ocean meet rainfall flowing downstream into the estuary.

=== Sea depth and topography ===
In addition to the above processes, storm surge and wave heights on shore are also affected by the flow of water over the underlying topography, i.e. the shape and depth of the ocean floor and coastal area. A narrow shelf, with deep water relatively close to the shoreline, tends to produce a lower surge but higher and more powerful waves. A wide shelf, with shallower water, tends to produce a higher storm surge with relatively smaller waves.

For example, in Palm Beach on the southeast coast of Florida, the water depth reaches 91 metres (299 ft) 3 km (1.9 mi) offshore, and 180 m (590 ft) 7 km (4.3 mi) out. This is relatively steep and deep; storm surge is not as great but the waves are larger compared to the west coast of Florida. Conversely, on the Gulf side of Florida, the edge of the Floridian Plateau can lie more than 160 kilometres (99 mi) offshore. Florida Bay, lying between the Florida Keys and the mainland, is very shallow with depths between 0.3 m (0.98 ft) and 2 m (6.6 ft). These shallow areas are subject to higher storm surges with smaller waves. Other shallow areas include much of the Gulf of Mexico coast, and the Bay of Bengal.

The difference is due to how much flow area the storm surge can dissipate to. In deeper water, there is more area and a surge can be dispersed down and away from the hurricane. On a shallow, gently sloping shelf, the surge has less room to disperse and is driven ashore by the wind forces of the hurricane.

The topography of the land surface is another important element in storm surge extent. Areas, where the land lies less than a few meters above sea level, are at particular risk from storm surge inundation.

=== Storm size ===
The size of the storm also affects the surge height; this is due to the storm's area not being proportional to its perimeter. If a storm doubles in diameter, its perimeter also doubles, but its area quadruples. As there is proportionally less perimeter for the surge to dissipate to, the surge height ends up being higher.

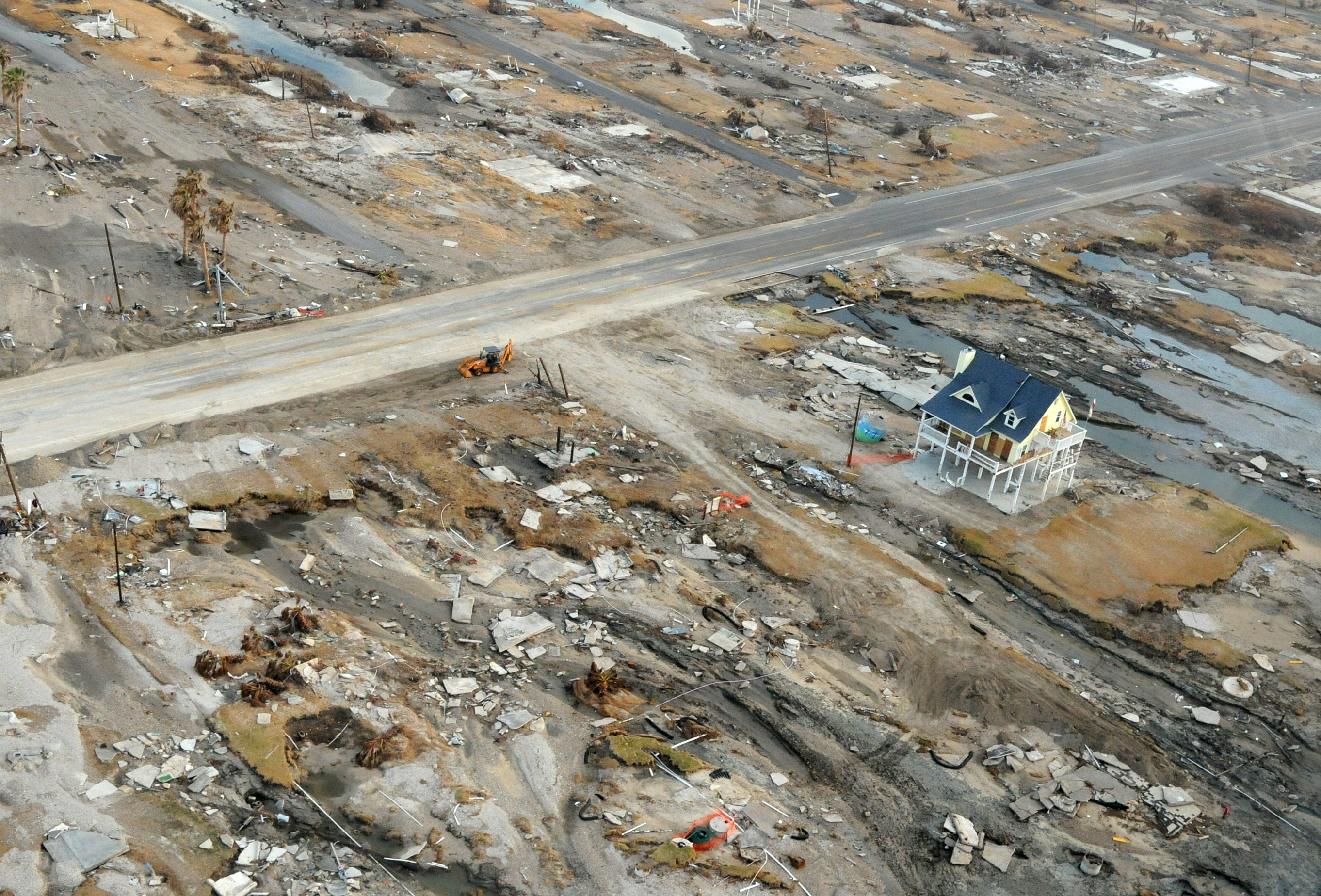
Hurricane Ike storm surge damage in Gilchrist, Texas in 2008.

== Extratropical storms ==
Similar to tropical cyclones, extratropical cyclones cause an offshore rise of water. However, unlike most tropical cyclone storm surges, extratropical cyclones can cause higher water levels across a large area for longer periods of time, depending on the system.

In North America, extratropical storm surges may occur on the Pacific and Alaska coasts, and north of 31°N on the Atlantic Coast. Coasts with sea ice may experience an "ice tsunami" causing significant damage inland. Extratropical storm surges may be possible further south for the Gulf coast mostly during the wintertime, when extratropical cyclones affect the coast, such as in the 1993 Storm of the Century.

November 9–13, 2009, marked a significant extratropical storm surge event on the United States east coast when the remnants of Hurricane Ida developed into a nor'easter off the southeast U.S. coast. During the event, winds from the east were present along the northern periphery of the low-pressure center for a number of days, forcing water into locations such as Chesapeake Bay. Water levels rose significantly and remained as high as 2.4 metres (8 ft) above normal in numerous locations throughout the Chesapeake for a number of days as water was continually built-up inside the estuary from the onshore winds and freshwater rains flowing into the bay. In many locations, water levels were shy of records by only 3 centimetres (0.1 ft).

== Measuring surge ==
Surge can be measured directly at coastal tidal stations as the difference between the forecast tide and the observed rise of water. Another method of measuring surge is by the deployment of pressure transducers along the coastline just ahead of an approaching tropical cyclone. This was first tested for Hurricane Rita in 2005. These types of sensors can be placed in locations that will be submerged and can accurately measure the height of water above them.

After surge from a cyclone has receded, teams of surveyors map high-water marks (HWM) on land, in a rigorous and detailed process that includes photographs and written descriptions of the marks. HWMs denote the location and elevation of floodwaters from a storm event. When HWMs are analyzed, if the various components of the water height can be broken out so that the portion attributable to surge can be identified, then that mark can be classified as storm surge. Otherwise, it is classified as storm tide. HWMs on land are referenced to a vertical datum (a reference coordinate system). During the evaluation, HWMs are divided into four categories based on the confidence in the mark; in the U.S., only HWMs evaluated as "excellent" are used by the National Hurricane Center in the post-storm analysis of the surge.

Two different measures are used for storm tide and storm surge measurements. Storm tide is measured using a geodetic vertical datum (NGVD 29 or NAVD 88). Since storm surge is defined as the rise of water beyond what would be expected by the normal movement caused by tides, storm surge is measured using tidal predictions, with the assumption that the tide prediction is well-known and only slowly varying in the region subject to the surge. Since tides are a localized phenomenon, storm surge can only be measured in relationship to a nearby tidal station. Tidal benchmark information at a station provides a translation from the geodetic vertical datum to mean sea level (MSL) at that location, then subtracting the tidal prediction yields a surge height above the normal water height.

== SLOSH ==
Example of a SLOSH run

The U.S. National Hurricane Center forecasts storm surge using the SLOSH model, which is an abbreviation for Sea, Lake and Overland Surges from Hurricanes. The model is accurate to within 20 percent. SLOSH inputs include the central pressure of a tropical cyclone, storm size, the cyclone's forward motion, its track, and maximum sustained winds. Local topography, bay and river orientation, depth of the sea bottom, astronomical tides, as well as other physical features, are taken into account in a predefined grid referred to as a SLOSH basin. Overlapping SLOSH basins are defined for the southern and eastern coastline of the continental U.S. Some storm simulations use more than one SLOSH basin; for instance, Hurricane Katrina SLOSH model runs used both the Lake Pontchartrain / New Orleans basin, and the Mississippi Sound basin, for the northern Gulf of Mexico landfall. The final output from the model run will display the maximum envelope of water, or MEOW, that occurred at each location.

To allow for track or forecast uncertainties, usually several model runs with varying input parameters are generated to create a map of MOMs or Maximum of Maximums. For hurricane evacuation studies, a family of storms with representative tracks for the region, and varying intensity, eye diameter, and speed are modeled to produce worst-case water heights for any tropical cyclone occurrence. The results of these studies are typically generated from several thousand SLOSH runs. These studies have been completed by the United States Army Corps of Engineers, under contract to the Federal Emergency Management Agency (FEMA), for several states and are available on their Hurricane Evacuation Studies (HES) website. They include coastal county maps, shaded to identify the minimum category of hurricane that will result in flooding, in each area of the county.

== Impacts ==
Storm surge is responsible for significant property damage and loss of life as part of cyclones. Storm surge both destroys built infrastructure, like roads, and undermines foundations and building structures.

Unexpected flooding in estuaries and coastal areas can catch populations unprepared, causing loss of life. The deadliest storm surge on record was the 1970 Bhola cyclone.

Additionally, storm surge can cause or transform human-utilized land through other processes, hurting soil fertility, increasing saltwater intrusion, hurting wildlife habitat, and spreading chemical or other contaminants from human storage.

== Mitigation ==
Although meteorological surveys alert about hurricanes or severe storms, in the areas where the risk of coastal flooding is particularly high, there are specific storm surge warnings. These have been implemented, for instance, in the Netherlands, Spain, the United States, and the United Kingdom. Similarly educating coastal communities and developing local evacuation plans can reduce the relative impact on people.

A prophylactic method introduced after the North Sea flood of 1953 is the construction of dams and storm-surge barriers (flood barriers). They are open and allow free passage, but close when the land is under threat of a storm surge. Major storm surge barriers are the Oosterscheldekering and Maeslantkering in the Netherlands, which are part of the Delta Works project; the Thames Barrier protecting London; and the Saint Petersburg Dam in Russia.

Another modern development (in use in the Netherlands) is the creation of housing communities at the edges of wetlands with floating structures, restrained in position by vertical pylons. Such wetlands can then be used to accommodate runoff and surges without causing damage to the structures while also protecting conventional structures at somewhat higher low-lying elevations, provided that dikes prevent major surge intrusion.

Other soft adaptation methods can include changing structures so that they are elevated to avoid flooding directly, or increasing natural protections like mangroves or dunes.

For mainland areas, storm surge is more of a threat when the storm strikes land from seaward, rather than approaching from landward.

== Reverse storm surge ==
Water can also be sucked away from shore prior to a storm surge. This was the case on the western Florida coast in 2017, just before Hurricane Irma made landfall, uncovering land usually underwater. This phenomenon is known as a reverse storm surge, or a negative storm surge.

== Historic storm surges ==
Elements of a storm tide at high tide

The deadliest storm surge on record was the 1970 Bhola cyclone, which killed up to 500,000 people in the area of the Bay of Bengal. The low-lying coast of the Bay of Bengal is particularly vulnerable to surges caused by tropical cyclones. The deadliest storm surge in the twenty-first century was caused by Cyclone Nargis, which killed more than 138,000 people in Myanmar in May 2008. The next deadliest in this century was caused by Typhoon Haiyan (Yolanda), which killed more than 6,000 people in the central Philippines in 2013 and resulted in economic losses estimated at US$14 billion.

The 1900 Galveston hurricane, a Category 4 hurricane that struck Galveston, Texas, drove a devastating surge ashore; between 6,000 and 12,000 people died, making it the deadliest natural disaster ever to strike the United States.

The highest storm tide noted in historical accounts was produced by the 1899 Cyclone Mahina, estimated at almost 13.41 metres (44 ft) at Bathurst Bay, Australia, but research published in 2000 concluded that the majority of this likely was wave run-up because of the steep coastal topography. However, much of this storm surge was likely due to Mahina's extreme intensity, as computer modeling required an intensity of 880 millibars (26 inHg) (the same intensity as the lowest recorded pressure from the storm) to produce the recorded storm surge. In the United States, one of the greatest recorded storm surges was generated by Hurricane Katrina on August 29, 2005, which produced a maximum storm surge of more than 8.53 metres (28 ft) in southern Mississippi, with a storm surge height of 8.47 metres (27.8 ft) in Pass Christian. Another record storm surge occurred in this same area from Hurricane Camille in 1969, with a storm tide of 7.50 metres (24.6 ft), also at Pass Christian. A storm surge of 4.27 metres (14 ft) occurred in New York City during Hurricane Sandy in October 2012.

== See also ==
- Coastal flooding
- Ishiguro Storm Surge Computer
- Meteotsunami
- Rogue wave
- Tsunami-proof building
