= National Oceanography Centre =

Oceanographic research institute in the United Kingdom

Coordinates: 50°53′34″N 1°23′41″W

- Abbreviation: NOC
- Formation: 1 April 2010
- Legal status: Charitable Company Limited by Guarantee
- Purpose: Ocean Research and Technological Development
- Headquarters: Southampton
- Region served: United Kingdom
- Chief Executive Officer: Prof. John Siddorn
- Main organ: NOC Board
- Affiliations: University of Southampton; University of Liverpool
- Website: www.noc.ac.uk

The National Oceanography Centre (NOC) is a marine science research and technology institute based across two sites, one in Southampton and one in Liverpool, England. It is the UK’s largest institute for integrated sea level science, coastal and deep ocean research and technology development. The Centre was established to promote co-operation with institutions across the UK marine science community, to better address key issues including sea level change, the ocean's role in climate change, computer simulation of the ocean's behaviour, and the long-term monitoring and future of the Arctic Circle.

== Marine science national capability ==
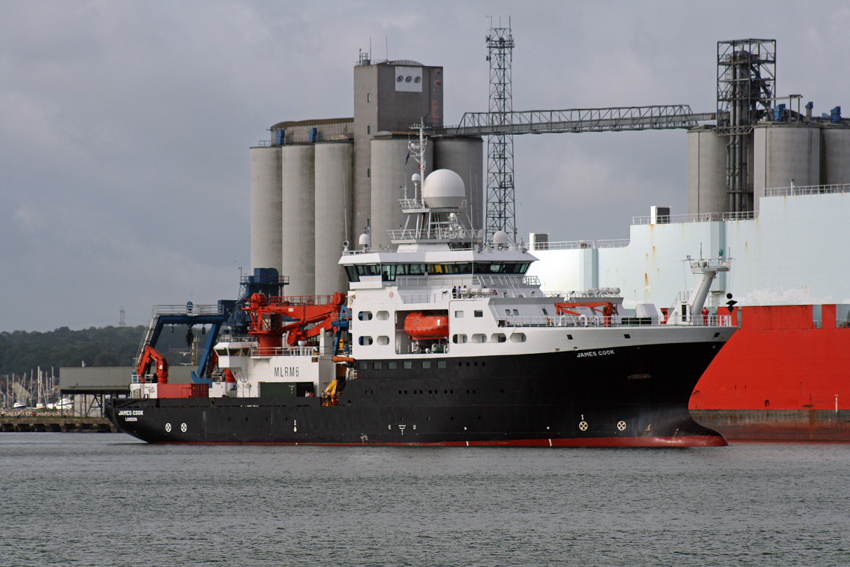
RRS James Cook returning to Southampton

The NOC operates ships and equipment which contribute to the country's national marine capability. Such equipment provided by the NOC includes Royal Research Ships, RRS James Cook and RRS Discovery, deep submersibles, including the Autosub autonomous underwater vehicles (AUVs), advanced ocean sensors and other instruments including Boaty McBoatface.

The NOC is responsible for a number of programs, including the global mean sea level data archive, the UK's sea level monitoring system for flood warning and climate change, and the national archive of subsea sediment cores. The NOC is also responsible for the National Oceanographic Library, which houses archives including those of RRS Discovery and HMS Challenger, and is the UK's main facility for holding and distributing marine environment data.

== History ==
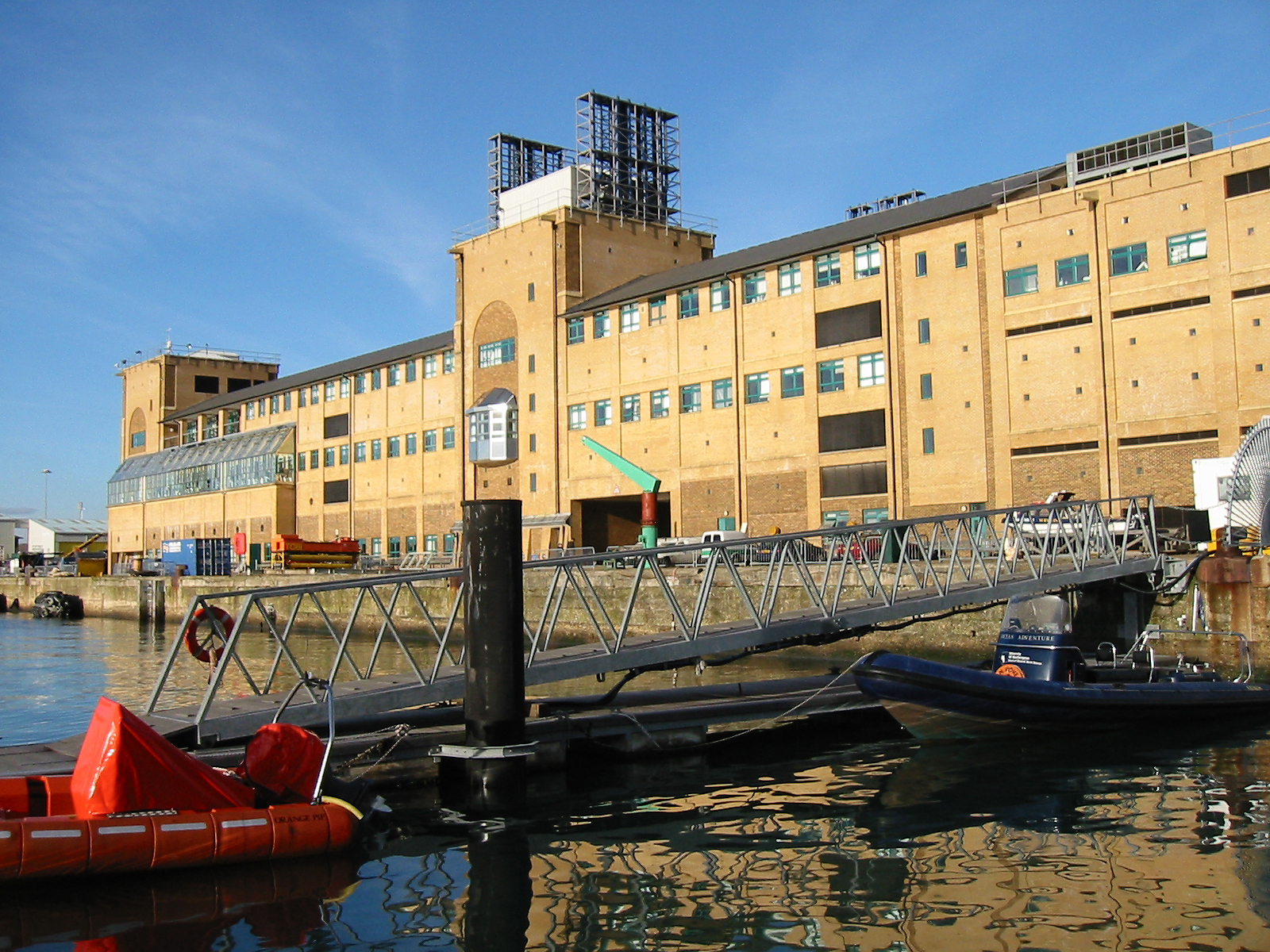
NOC Southampton

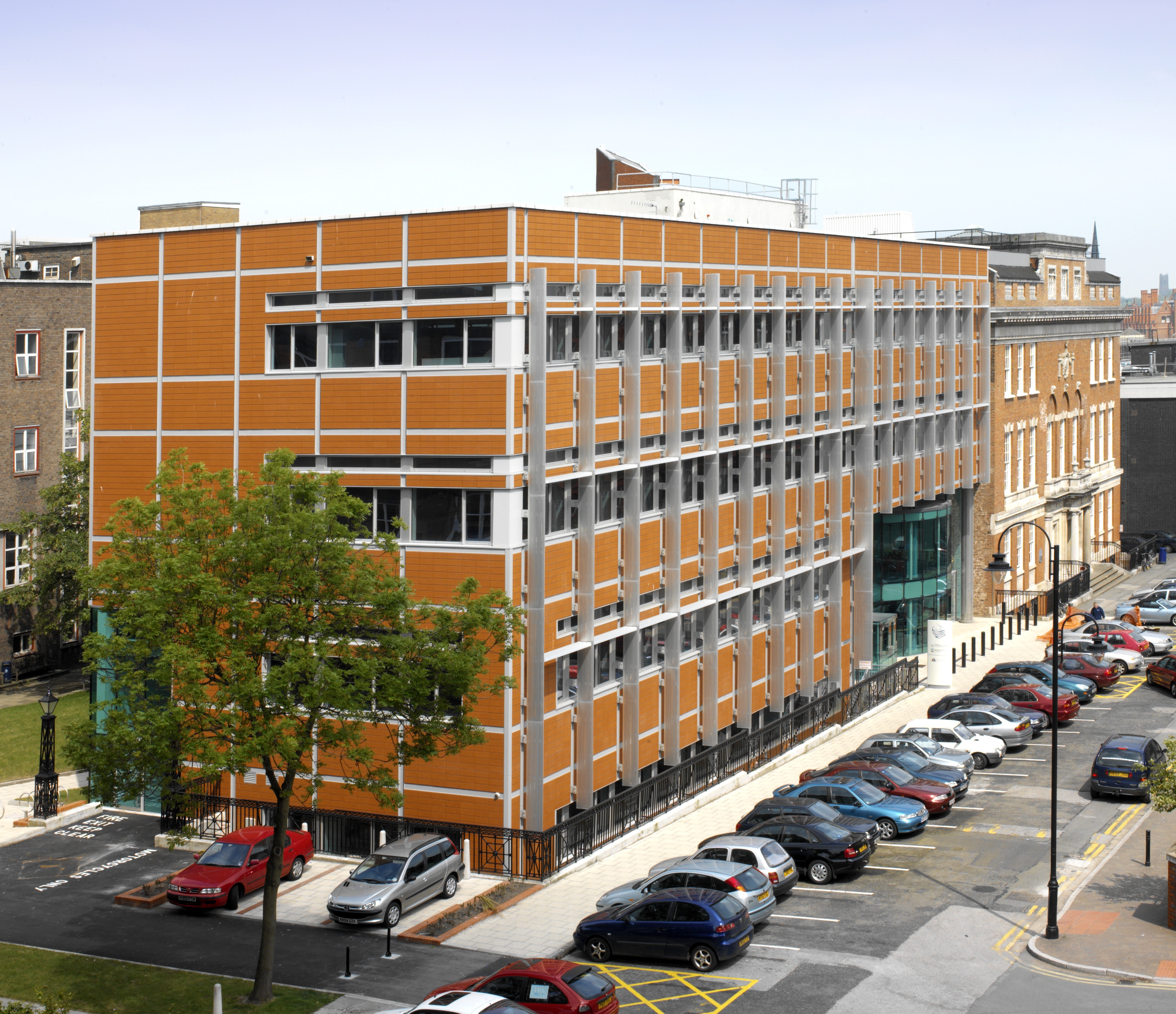
NOC Liverpool

The National Oceanography Centre’s waterfront headquarters were opened in 1996 by Prince Philip, as the Southampton Oceanography Centre. It brought together the University of Southampton's departments of oceanography and geology with the Institute of Oceanographic Sciences, formerly based in Wormley, Surrey, and Research Vessel Services, formerly based in Barry Docks, South Wales.

It was renamed the National Oceanography Centre, Southampton in 2005, again by the Duke of Edinburgh, its new name reflecting its prominence in ocean and earth sciences within the UK.

Until April 2010, the National Oceanography Centre, Southampton was jointly owned by the University of Southampton and the Natural Environment Research Council. The term National Oceanography Centre, Southampton continues to be used to describe the collaborative relationship at the waterfront campus.

The National Oceanography Centre’s Liverpool site, on the University of Liverpool campus, was formerly the Proudman Oceanographic Laboratory and specialises in tidal and sea level science. It hosts the National Tidal and Sea Level Facility, the Permanent Service for Mean Sea Level and the British Oceanographic Data Centre. It was formerly housed at the Bidston Observatory on the Wirral before moving to the University of Liverpool campus in 2004.

On 1 November 2019 the NOC began operating as an independent self-governing organisation – a charitable company limited by guarantee.

== NOC Association ==
The NOC Association of Marine Science National Capability Beneficiaries is a network of partners, associates and research institutions which work with the NOC in supporting research and technology development.

== Partners ==
The NOC’s partners include the University of Southampton, whose Ocean and Earth Science academic unit is co-located at the NOC’s dockside headquarters, which houses around 520 staff, as well as around 700 undergraduate and postgraduate students. The NOC's Joseph Proudman Building on the campus of the University of Liverpool is used for the teaching of postgraduate students.

The NOC is responsible for managing UK marine science national capability. This includes provision of major facilities, programmes of sustained observing, survey, mapping, data management and other functions. The NOC also manages contracts placed by NERC with other organisations to provide some national capability functions. Such organisations are known as Delivery Partners and include:

- Plymouth Marine Laboratory
- Scottish Association for Marine Science
- British Antarctic Survey
- British Geological Survey
- Marine Biological Association
- Sir Alister Hardy Foundation for Ocean Science (named after Alister Hardy)

The centre is committed to international engagement and has developed a range of international partnerships through the International and Strategic Partnerships Office, including an alliance of Europe’s three principal oceanographic research institutions with Ifremer of France and GEOMAR of Germany.

The NOC is a member of the European Global Ocean Observing System (EuroGOOS)
