= National Tidal and Sea Level Facility =

UK body for monitoring sea levels

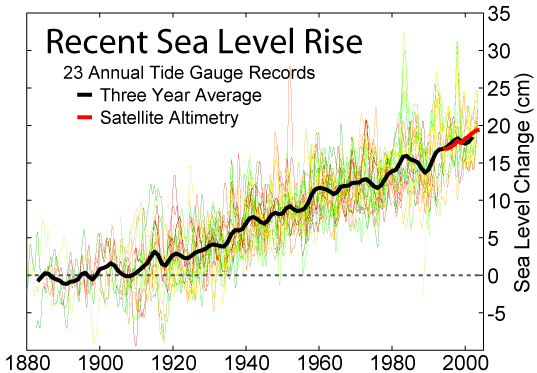
Recent sea level rise

Established in 2002, the National Tidal and Sea Level Facility is responsible for monitoring sea levels in the UK.

The NTSLF comprises the UK National Tide Gauge Network, geodetic networks, and gauges in the British dependent territories of the South Atlantic and Gibraltar. Data collected is used to create tidal predictions, monitor climate change and determine extreme sea levels for navigation and coastal engineering design.

The network is funded by the UK Environment Agency. Associated scientific research is funded by the Natural Environment Research Council (NERC) and the Department for Environment, Food and Rural Affairs (Defra).
