= H. Thomas Rossby =

American oceanographer

Hans Thomas Rossby (1937-2026) was an American oceanographer known for contributing to theoretical understanding of the Gulf Stream and ocean circulation more generally and for the development of new instrumentation. He invented some of the first acoustically-tracked Lagrangian floats and pioneered an ocean observation system based on commercial shipping, which has resulted in a long-time-series record of the Gulf Stream.

== Early life and education ==
Rossby was born in Boston as son of a Swedish father and American mother. His father was the famed meteorologist Carl-Gustaf Rossby. After mostly growing up in Sweden and taking a physics degree at the Royal Institute of Technology in 1962, he took his doctorate in oceanography at the Massachusetts Institute of Technology in 1966.

== Academics and inventions ==
Towards the end of his PhD, Rossby became involved in the program to develop the SOFAR float with Doug Webb and Hank Stommel, with the goal of making direct measurements of ocean circulation, instead of relying solely on density measurements. The SOFAR float, named after the SOFAR channel on which it relied as a wave guide, was equipped with a sound source which would chirp periodically. An array of moored receivers would trilaterate its position based on time-of-flight calculations. At first these floats used the existing SOFAR receiver system for locating missiles launched from Cape Canaveral during testing. Rossby was tasked with developing the system for tracking the floats using acoustic returns. After graduating, Rossby moved to Yale for several years where he continued to work on floats. He also began investigating the vertical structure of currents, a project which evolved into the Pegasus program. He became a professor of oceanography at the University of Rhode Island in 1975. While at URI, Rossby worked on the development and deployment of the RAFOS float, the successor to the SOFAR float, often in collaboration with his student Amy Bower. Instead of chirping itself, the RAFOS float listens for chirps from moored sound sources at known locations. Although it does not allow researchers to track its position live, the RAFOS float has greater endurance because receiving acoustic signals requires much less energy than emitting them. The early work with RAFOS, starting in 1984, was focused on the Gulf Stream, but use of the floats has since expanded around the world.

Related to the work on SOFAR and RAFOS floats, Rossby also developed the Pegasus profiler. The profiler would dive, drop a weight, and return to the surface. By acoustically tracking the position of the profiler using expendable sound sources on the bottom, the current could be determined as a function of depth. This information could be used to calculate depth-integrated transport. Rossby and his colleagues also built a simplified version called Pogo, which did not require any sound source. It would simply sink, return to the surface, and ping the ship. A radio beacon or a visible flashing light on the device were used to determine its bearing. The lateral displacement of the device from its original deployment location reflected the depth integrated current, although it did not provide a profile of the velocity versus depth.

Starting in the early 1990's Rossby worked to deploy XBTs and ADCPs on commercial vessels, most notably on the MV Oleander. In 1992 an ADCP was installed on the on the hull of the Oleander to take horizontal current measurements to a depth of 200 m on its regular trips from Bermuda to Port Elizabeth, NJ. Since then the instrument has been upgraded several times deeper measurements are available for some intervals. This record is of great significance because it crosses the Gulf Stream and provides information about the stability of the upper limb of the AMOC.

== Retirement and Blog ==
In retirement, Rossby remained active in the oceanography community, publishing numerous papers and regularly attending physical oceanography seminars and discussions at URI. He also began writing a blog chronicling his research experience, explaining instrumentation, and providing his thoughts on ongoing research.

H. Thomas Rossby, left, with colleagues, at the Ocean Sciences Meeting 2018 in Portland

== Awards ==
In 1988, the Woods Hole Oceanographic institution awarded Rossby the Bigelow Medal, along with his colleague Doug Webb. They were recognized for "creative contributions to ocean technology and oceanography, particularly in the development of the SOFAR float and advancing out [sic] knowledge of Lagrangian ocean dynamics."

In 1999 he was inducted into the American Academy of Arts and Sciences. He was a fellow of the Norwegian Academy of Science and Letters from 2003. Also in 2003 he given the Walter H. Munk Medal by the Oceanography Society.

He was inducted into the National Academy of Engineering in 2006 for the "development of deep-ocean instruments and their application in shaping an ocean observing system".

He was awarded the American Geophysical Union Maurice Ewing Medal in 2009.

Upon his retirement, a special issue of Deep Sea Research was published in his honor, titled "Modern Physical Oceanography and Professor H.T. Rossby".
