= Warren White (oceanographer) =

American oceanographer

Warren White is a professor emeritus, and a former Research Oceanographer at the Marine Biological Research Division at Scripps Institution of Oceanography at UC San Diego.

White, with 'Buzz' Bernstein, was instrumental in the development and operation of the TRANSPAC XBT Volunteer Observing Ship program. Between 1976 and 1984, commercial ships crossing the Pacific Ocean recorded expendable bathythermograph (XBT) data. This data became instrumental in a number of studies, particularly around the Kuroshio Current. As well as its direct oceanographic value, this data was also important for determining the scale of features of interest, thus influencing the design of later observational networks.

His research interests included:

- Planetary wave dynamics
- Interdecadal oscillations and their relation to El Niño and La Niña
- Global climate change
- Coupled ocean-atmosphere interaction

He is known for his work on the Antarctic Circumpolar Wave.

== Publications ==
- White, W. B.; Walker, A. E. (1974). "Time and depth scales of anomalous subsurface temperature at ocean weather stations P, N, and V in the North Pacific". Journal of Geophysical Research. 79 (30): 4517–4522. Bibcode:1974JGR....79.4517W. doi:10.1029/JC079i030p04517.
- Bernstein, R.; White, Warren (1974). "Time and length scales of baroclinic eddies in the Central North Pacific". Journal of Physical Oceanography. 4: 613–624. doi:10.1175/1520-0485(1974)004<0613:talsob>2.0.co;2.
- White, Warren (1975). "Secular variability in the baroclinic structure of the interior North Pacific from 1950–1970". Journal of Marine Research. 33: 141–155.
- Bernstein, R.; White, Warren (1979). "Design of an oceanographic network in the mid-latitude North Pacific". Journal of Physical Oceanography. 9 (3): 592–606. Bibcode:1979JPO.....9..592W. doi:10.1175/1520-0485(1979)009<0592:DOAONI>2.0.CO;2.
- Bernstein, R.; White, Warren (1981). "Stationary and travelling mesoscale perturbations in the Kurushio Extension current". Journal of Physical Oceanography. 11 (5): 692–704. Bibcode:1981JPO....11..692B. doi:10.1175/1520-0485(1981)011<0692:satmpi>2.0.co;2.
- White, Warren (1982). "Travelling wave-like mesoscale perturbations in the North Pacific". Journal of Physical Oceanography. 12: 231–243. doi:10.1175/1520-0485(1982)012<0231:twlmpi>2.0.co;2.
- White, Warren (1983). "Westward propagation of short term climatic anomalies in the western North Pacific Ocean from 1964–1974". Journal of Marine Research. 41: 113–125. doi:10.1357/002224083788223054.
- Mizuno, K.; White, Warren (1984). "Annual and interannual variability in the Kurushio current system". Journal of Physical Oceanography. 13 (10): 1847–1867. doi:10.1175/1520-0485(1983)013<1847:aaivit>2.0.co;2.
- White, Warren; Meyers, Gary A.; Donguy, Jean Rene; Pazan, Stephen E. (1985). "Short-Term Climatic Variability in the Thermal Structure of the Pacific Ocean during 1979–82". Journal of Physical Oceanography. 15 (7): 917–935. Bibcode:1985JPO....15..917W. doi:10.1175/1520-0485(1985)015<0917:stcvit>2.0.co;2.
- Talley, Lynne D.; White, Warren (1987). "Estimates of Time and Space Scales at 300 Meters in the Midlatitude North Pacific from the TRANSPAC XBT Program". Journal of Physical Oceanography. 17 (12): 2168–2188. Bibcode:1987JPO....17.2168T. doi:10.1175/1520-0485(1987)017<2168:EOTASS>2.0.CO;2.
- White, Warren; Pazan, Stephen E.; Withee, Gregory W.; Noe, Christopher (1988). "Joint Environment Data Analysis (JEDA) Center". Eos, Transactions American Geophysical Union. 69 (9): 122–131. Bibcode:1988EOSTr..69..122W. doi:10.1029/88EO00079.
- White, Warren (1995). "Design of a global observing system for gyre-scale upper ocean temperature variability". Progress in Oceanography. 36 (3): 169–217. Bibcode:1995PrOce..36..169W. doi:10.1016/0079-6611(95)00017-8.
- White, Warren; Tai, Chang-Kou (1995). "Inferring interannual changes in global upper ocean heat storage from TOPEX altimetry". Journal of Geophysical Research. 100 (C12): 24943–24954. Bibcode:1995JGR...10024943W. doi:10.1029/95JC02332.
- White, Warren; Peterson, Ray G. (1996). "An Antarctic circumpolar wave in surface pressure, wind, temperature and sea-ice extent". Nature. 380 (6576): 699–702. Bibcode:1996Natur.380..699W. doi:10.1038/380699a0. S2CID 4312307.
- White, Warren; Shyh-Chin Chen; Peterson, R. (1998). "The Antarctic Circumpolar Wave: A beta-effect in ocean-atmosphere coupling over the Southern Ocean". Journal of Physical Oceanography. 28 (12): 2345–2361. Bibcode:1998JPO....28.2345W. doi:10.1175/1520-0485(1998)028<2345:TACWAB>2.0.CO;2.
- White, Warren (2000). "Influence of the Antarctic Circumpolar Wave upon Australia precipitation from 1958 to 1996". Journal of Climate. 13: 2125–2141. doi:10.1175/1520-0442(2000)013<2125:iotacw>2.0.co;2.
- White, Warren; Cayan, D. R. (2000). "A global El Niño-Southern Oscillation wave in surface temperature and pressure and its interdecadal modulation from 1900 to 1997". Journal of Geophysical Research. 105 (11): 223–11, 242. Bibcode:2000JGR...10511223W. doi:10.1029/1999JC900246.
- White, Warren; Cayan, Daniel R.; Dettinger, Michael; Sharber, James (Jan 9, 2001). "Quantitative Assessment of the Integrated Response in Global Heat and Moisture Budgets to Changing Solar Irradiance". Technical Report. 01. NASA Goddard Space Flight Center: 81064. Bibcode:2001STIN...0181064W. 20010081063.
- White, Warren (2001). "Evidence for coupled Rossby waves in the annual cycle of the Indo-Pacific Ocean". Journal of Physical Oceanography. 31 (10): 2944–2957. Bibcode:2001JPO....31.2944W. doi:10.1175/1520-0485(2001)031<2944:EFCRWI>2.0.CO;2.
- White, Warren; Shyh-Chin Chen; Allan, Rob J.; Stone, Roger C. (2002). "Positive feedbacks between the Antarctic Circumpolar Wave and the global El Niño-Southern Oscillation Wave". Journal of Geophysical Research. 107 (C10, 3165): 3165. Bibcode:2002JGRC..107.3165W. doi:10.1029/2000JC000581.
- White, Warren; McKeon, Greg; Syktus, Jozef (May 2003). "Australian drought: the interference of multi-spectral global standing modes and travelling waves". International Journal of Climatology. 23 (6): 631–662. Bibcode:2003IJCli..23..631W. doi:10.1002/joc.895. S2CID 128907721.
- White, Warren; Gershunov, Alexander; Annis, Jeffrey L.; McKeon, Greg; Syktus, Jozef (2004). "Forecasting Australian Drought Using Southern Hemisphere Modes of Sea-Surface Temperature Variability". International Journal of Climatology. 24 (15): 1911–1927. Bibcode:2004IJCli..24.1911W. doi:10.1002/joc.1091. S2CID 7394683.
