= Journal of Physical Oceanography =

Peer-reviewed scientific journal published by the American Meteorological Society

- Discipline: Physical oceanography
- Language: English
- Edited by: Jerome A. Smith

Publication details
- History: 1971–present
- Publisher: American Meteorological Society (United States)
- Frequency: Monthly
- Open access: Delayed, after 12 months
- Impact factor: 3.373 (2020)

Standard abbreviations
- ISO 4: J. Phys. Oceanogr.

Indexing
- CODEN: JPYOBT
- ISSN: 0022-3670 (print); 1520-0485 (web)
- LCCN: 72621791
- OCLC no.: 1783916

Links
- Journal homepage; Journal page at the American Meteorological Society

The Journal of Physical Oceanography (JPO) is a monthly peer-reviewed scientific journal published by the American Meteorological Society (AMS). It publishes research in physical oceanography, on the physics of the ocean and of the processes at its boundaries. The journal was established in 1971, with Robert O. Reid as its founding editor. Its chief editor is Jerome A. Smith of the Scripps Institution of Oceanography.

== History ==
=== Founding ===
No scientific society devoted purely to physical oceanography has ever existed, and most professional oceanographic organizations are dominated in numbers by biological oceanographers. A 2018 history of ocean circulation research suggests that this may explain how a meteorological society came to be the home of ocean physics when the journal was established.

In October 1968 the AMS Council reviewed a report from the society's Planning Commission, presented by Robert M. White. It voted that the society's executive committee and executive director should look into broadening its publications and meetings to give more emphasis to physical oceanography. On January 20, 1969, White submitted the commission's recommendation that the society move actively into related fields of geophysics, and into physical oceanography in particular. The Council then voted that a Journal of Physical Oceanography be published quarterly. The first issue was planned for January 1970, to coincide with the society's 50th anniversary.

The search for an editor was still going on in April 1969. That summer the society's executive director, Kenneth Spengler, invited Robert O. Reid of Texas A&M University to be the founding editor, and the Council appointed him on October 2. According to Reid, the Council had approved the journal because it expected a growing number of papers on physical oceanography and air–sea interaction, at a time when new funding and new observing technology were producing rapid growth in the geoscience literature.

In August 1970 the society listed the journal as a new quarterly, with its first volume to appear in 1971. The first issue is dated January 1971. Reid later recalled that one oceanographer he had asked to join the board of associate editors declined, believing that a journal devoted to physical oceanography was not needed, and went on to become one of its most prolific authors.

=== Growth ===
The first volume had about 300 pages. Volume 10, in 1980, had more than 2,000, and volume 23, in 1993, had almost 3,000. The journal moved from quarterly to bimonthly publication with volume 6 in 1976, and to monthly publication with volume 10 in 1980. Reporting in 1980, the chairman of the society's Publications Commission said that the journal was about 50% larger than a year earlier and 80% larger than two years earlier.

Reid compared the journal with three others that carried ocean science: the Journal of Marine Research, Deep Sea Research, and the Journal of Geophysical Research. By his count, the pages of ocean science that the four published each year grew about ninefold between 1969 and 1993, and the Journal of Physical Oceanography supplied about 28% of the total over that period.

The journal's 25th volume, in 1995, opened with a commentary by Reid and included two papers on the history of ocean science. The anniversary was also marked by a symposium, "A Salute to JPO", at the society's annual meeting in Atlanta in 1996.

=== Editorial organization ===
Reid was the journal's only editor through 1979, working with a board of associate editors. On January 1, 1980, he was succeeded by two co-chief editors, William R. Holland of the National Center for Atmospheric Research and Bruce A. Warren of the Woods Hole Oceanographic Institution, who divided new manuscripts between them by subject. Two co-editors continued to share the work through the 1980s. In 1991 a third editor was appointed to help with the number of submissions. One of the three was designated chief editor, though each continued to handle manuscripts independently. Eli Joel Katz of the Lamont–Doherty Geological Observatory was listed as chief editor that August.

The number of editors grew as submissions increased, to four in 1999 and six in 2002. Since January 2009 every submission has gone first to the chief editor, who passes it to the editor for its subject, as at other AMS journals. In March 2025 the journal listed a chief editor, 12 editors, and a board of associate editors.

Walter Munk recalled that the journal's editor at first declined to publish an early paper on ocean acoustic tomography unless it gave the precise position of a receiver, which was a U.S. Navy SOSUS listening array. The authors had agreed to give its range only to the nearest 100 km, and they argued successfully that positions needed to be no more precise than the scientific interpretation required.

=== Online publication and access ===
The AMS has published its journals online as well as in print since January 1997, and by 2001 it had put nearly all of their earlier articles online. For some years the society made journal content free to read online once it was five years old, and it later reduced the delay to two years. In 2012 it introduced an option for authors to pay a fee to make an article freely available on publication. As of 2026, the journal's articles are free to read 12 months after publication, or earlier if the author chooses.

== Scope and content ==
The journal publishes research on the physics of the ocean and on the processes at its boundaries. It accepts observational, theoretical, and modeling studies, and favors those that explain a particular physical process. Papers on how the ocean interacts with the atmosphere or with marine biology and chemistry, and studies of other fluid systems such as lakes and laboratory tanks, are considered when their aim is to understand the ocean or its role in the Earth system.

In the 1970s the society described the journal's subject as "the physics and chemistry of the oceans and of the processes coupling the sea to the atmosphere", with topics that included ocean circulation, surface and internal waves, turbulence and mixing, the properties of seawater, and tides. By 1988 the editors defined it as "research related to the physics of the ocean and of the processes operating at its boundaries". They referred papers that were mainly about technical developments to the Journal of Atmospheric and Oceanic Technology, and judged studies of rivers, lakes, laboratory tanks, and fluid dynamics in general by their relevance to the ocean.

Research articles have been limited to 7,500 words since 2003, unless a longer paper is approved. The journal also publishes review articles, and comments on published papers with replies from their authors.

Special issues and collections have included a 1987 memorial issue for the oceanographer Adrian Gill, with Peter Killworth as guest editor, and a 2006 collection of 15 papers from the Hawaii Ocean Mixing Experiment, a study of how tides lose energy to mixing along the Hawaiian Ridge.

In 2013 the journal's editors and the AMS made an exception to the society's style rules, which do not allow the names of variables to be capitalized, so that "Absolute Salinity" and "Conservative Temperature" are printed as the TEOS-10 standard for the properties of seawater defines them. The exception was meant to encourage use of the standard, and it applies to all AMS journals.

== Editors ==
Until 1991 the journal was edited by one or two people at a time:

- 1971–1979: Robert O. Reid (Texas A&M University), editor
- 1980–1983: William R. Holland (National Center for Atmospheric Research), co-chief editor
- 1980–1984: Bruce A. Warren (Woods Hole Oceanographic Institution), co-chief editor
- 1983: Douglas R. Caldwell, editor
- 1983–1987: Robert L. Haney, co-editor
- 1985–1986: Melbourne G. Briscoe, co-editor
- 1986–1991: Eli Joel Katz (Lamont–Doherty Geological Observatory), co-editor
- 1988–1991: Peter R. Gent (National Center for Atmospheric Research), co-editor

Since 1991 one of the editors has been chief editor:

- 1991–1996: Eli Joel Katz (Lamont–Doherty Geological Observatory)
- 1997–1999: Julian P. McCreary (Nova Southeastern University)
- 1999–2008: Peter Müller (University of Hawaii)
- 2009–2016: Michael A. Spall (Woods Hole Oceanographic Institution)
- Jerome A. Smith (Scripps Institution of Oceanography), an editor since 2007, was chief editor by January 2019 and holds the post as of 2026.

== Notable papers ==
In a 1975 paper, Klaus Wyrtki traced the changes in coastal upwelling off Peru during El Niño to Kelvin waves generated when the trade winds relax over the central Pacific, and not to changes in the local winds. The first dynamical theories of El Niño based on this idea followed soon afterward.

W. D. Hibler's "A Dynamic Thermodynamic Sea Ice Model" (1979) treated sea ice as a material with a nonlinear viscous–plastic rheology. A 2010 review of sea-ice models for climate studies lists it among the major advances in modeling the motion of sea ice that came out of field observations in the 1970s, and says that its viscous–plastic law "has become the standard rheological model".

T. R. Osborn's 1980 paper gave a way to estimate the rate of vertical mixing in the ocean from measurements of the rate at which turbulence dissipates energy. A 2018 review of mixing in the ocean describes this "Osborn (1980) method" and notes that the value of 0.2 that Osborn gave as an upper bound on the mixing coefficient has often been used since as a constant.

"The Ventilated Thermocline" (1983), by James R. Luyten, Joseph Pedlosky, and Henry Stommel, represented the upper ocean as two or three layers that do not mix, with the properties of each layer set where it is in contact with the surface. Carl Wunsch and Raffaele Ferrari call the theory it started "the most important" of the theories of a steady, laminar ocean circulation. Pedlosky later described it as "a useful null hypothesis", an attempt to see how much of the thermocline the simplest dynamics could explain.

In 1990 Peter R. Gent and James C. McWilliams proposed a parameterization of mesoscale eddies for ocean models whose grids are too coarse to resolve them. It represents the tendency of the eddies to flatten surfaces of constant density without mixing water across them. According to Wunsch and Ferrari, its success improved the fidelity of climate models and led the way to theories of the circulation of the Southern Ocean and of the ocean's overturning circulation. Gent wrote in 2011 that the scheme was used in "virtually every climate model". He also wrote that, together with other improvements, it allowed the first version of the Community Climate System Model to produce the first control simulation that did not drift and did not need corrections to the fluxes of heat and fresh water.

== Abstracting and indexing ==
This journal is abstracted and indexed in:

- Current Contents/Agriculture, Biology & Environmental Sciences
- Current Contents/Physical, Chemical & Earth Sciences
- Science Citation Index
- ASTIS bibliography
- ASTIS current awareness bulletin
- Canadian Environment
- Computer & Control Abstracts
- Electrical & Electronics Abstracts
- Energy Research Abstracts
- FLUIDEX
- GeoRef
- International Aerospace Abstracts
- Physics Abstracts
- Selected Water Resources Abstracts
- Ship Abstracts
- SPIN

According to the Journal Citation Reports, the journal has a 2020 impact factor of 3.373.
