= George Veronis =

American geophysicist

George Veronis (3 June 1926 – 30 June 2019) was an American geophysicist.

He was born in New Brunswick, New Jersey to Greek Americans. After serving in the US Navy during World War II, he graduated with a BSc in mathematics from Lafayette College in 1950 and took his PhD in applied mathematics at Brown University in 1954.

He immediately started working for the Institute for Advanced Study, before being recruited by Henry Stommel to the Woods Hole Oceanographic Institution in 1956. Veronis and Stommel both left Woods Hole for MIT in 1963. He was then hired at Yale University in 1966, where he served as Henry Barnard Davis Professor of Geophysics and Applied Science from 1985 until his retirement in 2009.

After chairing Yale's Department of Earth and Planetary Sciences from 1976 to 1979, he headed its Applied Mathematics Program from 1979 to 1993. Veronis was also the editor of the Journal of Marine Research for 37 years.

Veronis was a fellow of the American Academy of Arts and Sciences from 1963, the American Geophysical Union from 1975, the Norwegian Academy of Science and Letters from 1981, and the National Academy of Sciences from 1994. He received the Henry Stommel Research Award from the American Meteorological Society in 1997.
