= Flierl =

Flierl is a German language surname. Notable people with the name include:

- Brigitte Flierl (born 1956), German speed skater
- Bruno Flierl (1927–2023), German architect, architecture critic, and writer
- Glenn R. Flierl (born 1948), Researcher, oceanography
- Hans Flierl (1885–1974), German jurist and local politician
- Johann Flierl (1858–1947), German pioneer Lutheran missionary in New Guinea
- Jule Flierl (born 1982), German artist and actress
- Markus Flierl (born 1971), Researcher, computer science
- Thomas Flierl (born 1957), German architectural historian and local politician
