= CSIRO Oceans and Atmosphere =

Australian research organisation, 2014–2022

CSIRO Oceans and Atmosphere (O&A) was one of the then 8 business units (formerly: flagships) of the CSIRO, Australia's largest government-supported science research agency. In December 2022, it was merged with CSIRO Land and Water to form CSIRO Environment.

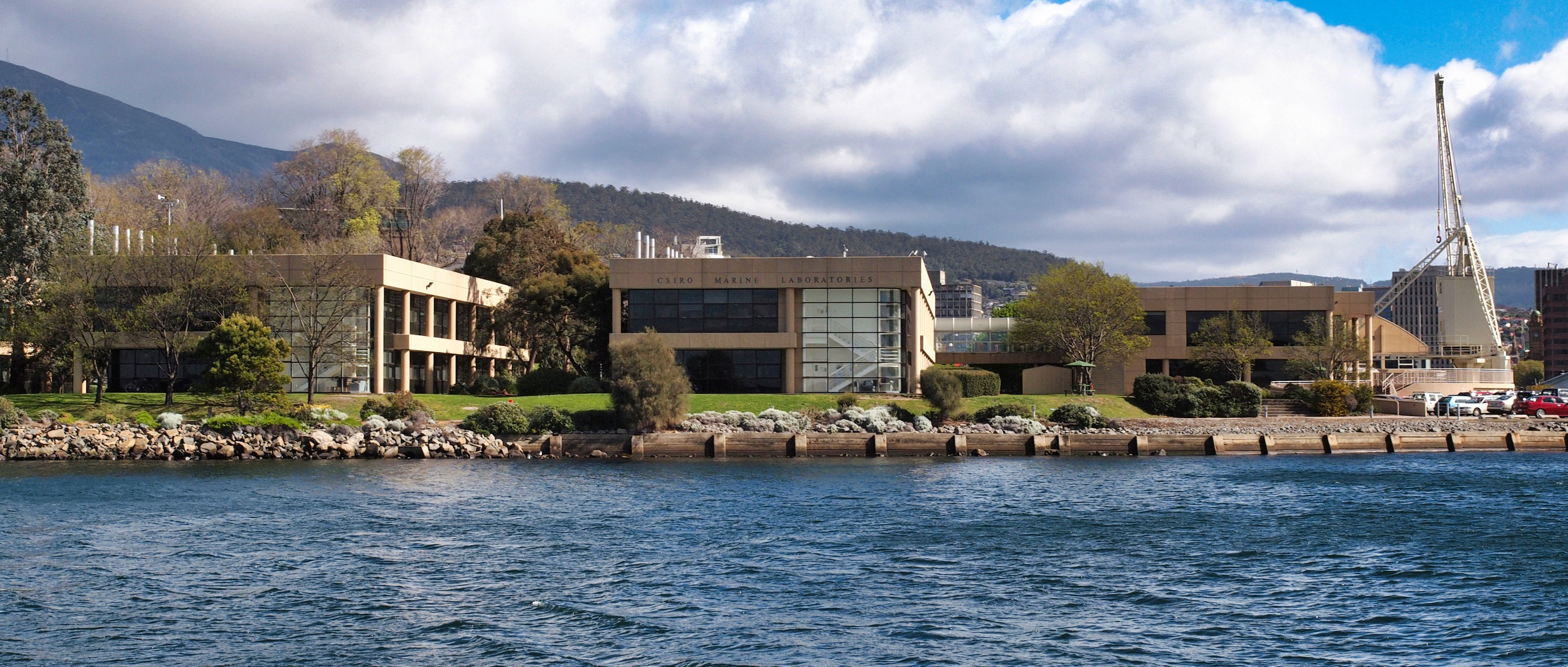
CSIRO Marine Laboratories in Hobart, home of the largest component of CSIRO O&A staff

== History ==
The CSIRO Oceans and Atmosphere (O&A) Business Unit was formed in 2014 as one of the then 10 flagship operational units of the CSIRO as part of a major organisational restructure; from 2015 onwards the term "flagship" was officially dropped. This business unit was formed essentially as a synthesis of the pre-existing CSIRO Marine and Atmospheric Research (CMAR), representing the scientific capability, and the previously established Wealth from Oceans (WfO) Flagship, which was the route via which much of the relevant Australian government research funding was directed. In 2016, its director was Ken Lee, previously WfO Flagship Director; in 2017 its director was Tony Worby, previously with the Antarctic Climate and Ecosystems Cooperative Research Centre (ACE CRC); and for the period 2021–2022 its final director was Dan Metcalfe. The O&A Business Unit employed between 350 and 400 staff who were/are located at its various laboratories including Hobart (Tasmania), Aspendale (Victoria), Dutton Park (Queensland), Black Mountain (Canberra) and Floreat Park (Western Australia). For 2016 it was quoted as operating with an annual budget of $108 million with its research organised into the following programs: Climate Science Centre; Coastal Development and Management; Earth System Assessment; Engineering and Technology; Marine Resources and Industries; and Ocean and Climate Dynamics. Certain previous CMAR activities, notably those involving the operation of the Marine National Facility (research vessel) RV Investigator and several scientific collections, are now managed within the separate CSIRO National Facilities and Collections Program.

The previous CSIRO Division of Marine and Atmospheric Research was itself formed as a result of a 2005 merger between the former CSIRO Division of Marine Research, with laboratories in Hobart, Brisbane, and Perth, and CSIRO Division of Atmospheric Research, with laboratories in Aspendale and Canberra; the Division of Marine Research was formed in 1997 as a merger between two previous CSIRO Divisions, the Division of Fisheries Research and the Division of Oceanography, both with their headquarters in Hobart since 1984; prior to that time, the Division of Fisheries and Oceanography (subsequently separate Divisions) had occupied facilities in Cronulla since its inception in 1938 (following the CSIRO's departure this site became the New South Wales State Cronulla Fisheries Research Centre). Additional details of the somewhat convoluted organisational history of the relevant Divisions and their predecessors are available here.

In December 2022 it was announced that CSIRO Oceans and Atmosphere was to merge with CSIRO Land and Water to form a new business unit (cited on the CSIRO website as a "research unit"), Environment.

== Seagoing capabilities ==
Through the 1980s and 1990s the marine Divisions of CSIRO had the use of both the Southern Surveyor, equipped for biological as well as oceanographic research, and the purpose-built Franklin for physical and chemical oceanographic research, both of which served at various times as the Marine National Facility for the nation (meaning that other agencies could also carry out research using these vessels at what was effectively a subsidised rate by the Australian government). The last of the vessels to be retired, the Southern Surveyor, was replaced in 2014 by a new purpose-built research vessel to serve as the Marine National Facility, the RV Investigator. Coupled with these major vessels, all capable of significant ocean-going research expeditions, staff were able to use a range of smaller boats and sometimes, charter vessels to carry out research in a range of coastal waters.

== 2016 Climate Science cuts controversy and subsequent partial restoration ==
In February 2016 the chief executive of CSIRO, Dr Larry Marshall, announced that research into the fundamentals of climate science was no longer a priority for CSIRO and up to 110 jobs were feared to be cut from the climate research section(s) of the Oceans and Atmosphere Unit. After overwhelming negative reaction both within Australia and overseas, along with the forced redundancy of prominent climate scientists including the internationally renowned sea level expert Dr John Church, the Australian Government intervened with a directive and promise of new money to support the restoration of 15 jobs and the creation of a new Climate Science Centre to be based in Hobart with a staff of 40, with funding guaranteed for 10 years from 2016, although the expected number of job losses for O&A was still estimated at 75. While the establishment of the new Centre was described as a "major U-turn in the direction of the CSIRO" and a win for the Turnbull government over the previous CSIRO announcement, the generally positive reaction from other scientists was qualified by the fact that the new Centre would still represent a net loss to CSIRO's previous capability in this area.

== Selected notable scientists associated with O&A and its predecessors ==
- Kenneth Radway Allen – fisheries biologist, International Whaling Commission (IWC) panel member, and former head of the CSIRO Division of Fisheries and Oceanography in Cronulla
- Greg Ayers – atmospheric scientist, Fellow of the Australian Academy of Technological Sciences and Engineering, and subsequently Director of the Bureau of Meteorology, 2009–2012
- John A. Church – renowned climate scientist, winner of a number of medals and Fellow of the Australian Academy of Science, also co-convening lead author for the International Panel for Climate Change (IPCC) Fifth Assessment Report
- Shirley Jeffrey – discoverer of chlorophyll C and internationally renowned microalgal researcher, winner of numerous medals and Fellow of the Australian Academy of Science
- Peter R. Last – ichthyologist, former curator of the Australian National Fish Collection, and responsible for the description of numerous new shark and ray species; co-author (with John Stevens) of Sharks and Rays of Australia (2009)
- Trevor McDougall – oceanographer, Fellow of the Royal Society and 2011 winner of the Prince Albert I Medal for significant work in the physical and chemical sciences of the oceans
- Graeme Pearman – international expert on climate change, winner of numerous medals and Fellow of the Australian Academy of Science
- Michael Raupach – climate scientist and founding co-chair of the Global Carbon Project (GCP) and Fellow of the Australian Academy of Science
- Keith J. Sainsbury – researcher on shelf ecosystems and winner of the 2004 Japan Prize for scientific achievement
- Penny Whetton – climate researcher, a lead author of the IPCC's Third Assessment Report, and of the Fourth Assessment Report which was awarded the 2007 Nobel Peace Prize (jointly with Al Gore)
- Susan Wijffels – oceanographer with special interest in the international Argo float program; winner the Australian Meteorological and Oceanographic Society's Priestly Medal and the Australian Academy of Science's Dorothy Hill Award in recognition of her efforts to understand the role of the oceans in climate change.

== Books on CSIRO's marine research activities ==
CSIRO At Sea, a "popular" account of the early research activities of the marine components of the relevant CSIRO Divisions (former Divisions of Fisheries, Fisheries and Oceanography, Oceanography, and Fisheries Research) was published in 1988, a few years after the relocation of the majority of CSIRO's marine research activities to Hobart from Cronulla.

== See also ==
- Network of Aquaculture Centres in Asia-Pacific
