= Russ E. Davis =

American oceanographer

Russ E. Davis (1941–2022) was an American oceanographer. He was a fellow of the American Academy of Arts and Sciences, the American Geophysical Union and the American Meteorological Society. He won a Maurice Ewing Medal, a Prince Albert I Medal and a Henry Stommel Research Award.
