= Henry Stommel Research Award =

Ocean physics award by the American Meteorological Society

The Henry Stommel Research Award is awarded by the American Meteorological Society to researchers in recognition of outstanding contributions to the advancement of the understanding of the dynamics and physics of the ocean. The award is in the form of a medallion and was named for Henry Stommel.

== Recipients ==
Year^{[A]}	Recipient	Rationale
1995	Melvin E. Stern	"for profound and original contributions to the development of geophysical fluid dynamics and its application to the physics of the ocean circulation"
1996	Joseph L. Reid	"for fundamental contributions to a quantitative understanding of the global circulation, based on detailed and insightful analyses of hydrographic observations"
1997	George Veronis	"for a wide range of fundamental contributions to the development of physical oceanography and geophysical fluid dynamics"
1998	Nicholas P. Fofonoff	"for his fundamental work on the general circulation and the physical properties of the ocean and for development of observational techniques in physical oceanography"
1999	Peter B. Rhines	"for amazing physical insight and profound appreciation of observations as a guide to understanding how the ocean works"
2000	Carl I. Wunsch	"for his leadership in understanding the circulation of the global ocean, and his insistence that our understanding and models be based upon and assessed through direct observations."
2001	Christopher J. R. Garrett	"for his rare ability to use simple models or concepts to expose the rich underlying physics that leads us all to a more profound understanding of ocean processes"
2002	Nelson G. Hogg	"for elucidating the structure and dynamics of the ocean circulation through observation, analysis, and theory"
2003	Harry L. Bryden	"for fundamental and elegant observational contributions to understanding the oceanic general circulation"
2004	Friedrich A. Schott	"for systematically undertaking observations in challenging environments and for bold interpretation leading to greater understanding of the ocean circulation"
2005	John S. Allen	"for his insightful and rigorous elucidation of ocean processes over the continental shelf and slope"
2006	Michael C. Gregg	"for outstanding and comprehensive measurements of turbulence and mixing in many oceanic environments, and particularly for establishing a quantitative relationship between pelagic mixing rates and the energy of internal waves"
2007	John A. Whitehead	“For his fundamental contributions to Geophysical Fluid Dynamics and Physical Oceanography, for which his laboratory and observational studies of rotating hydraulic flows have been particularly illuminating.”
2008	Peter D. Killworth	“For his many important contributions to ocean modeling and theoretical oceanography, which have significantly extended our knowledge of the processes governing ocean circulation”
2009	Kirk Bryan, Jr.	“For pioneering contributions to ocean circulation modeling, including model development and applications to the study of ocean heat transport and the ocean's role in climate”
2010	Thomas B. Sanford	"For pioneering development of unique instruments based on electromagnetic sensors and for using them to unravel key features of ocean dynamics"
2011	Dudley B. Chelton	"For fundamental contributions to advancing our understanding of ocean circulation and air-sea interaction."
2012	Robert Pinkel	"For developing outstanding instrumentation, using it widely, and interpreting the results to advance understanding of numerous small-scale processes in the upper ocean."
2013	Laurence Armi	"For his deeply insightful studies of stratified flow, his pioneering work on boundary mixing and other turbulent mechanisms."
2014	James N. Moum	"For fundamental research on quantifying and modeling vertical mixing in the ocean."
2015	Glenn R. Flierl	"For fundamental insights into the dynamics of vortices and geostrophic turbulence and their impact on marine ecosystems"
2016	Robert Pickart	"For pioneering work in the exploration of high-latitude water masses and currents and for advancing the understanding of their climatic impact."
2017	Lynne D. Talley	"For exceptional contributions to understanding the genesis, distribution, and fate of mode and intermediate waters, and their importance in global heat and freshwater transport"
2018	Gregory C. Johnson	"For fundamental contributions to understanding oceanic variability, from equator to poles and surface to abyss, and for pioneering studies of the oceans’ role in climate"
2019	Martin Visbeck	"For outstanding contributions to understanding ocean circulation and mixing, and the role of the oceans in climate"
2020	Arnold L. Gordon	"For pioneering observational studies that have fundamentally advanced our understanding of Southern Ocean and inter-basin circulation"
2021	Bo Qiu	"For seminal contributions using observations, models, and theory to understand the dynamics of the North Pacific Ocean circulation and its role in the climate system"
2022	M. Susan Lozier	"For theoretical, observational, modeling contributions and leadership in significantly improving our understanding of Atlantic Ocean circulation"
2023	Susan Wijffels	"For exceptional contributions to understanding oceanic and freshwater storage and transport of heat and monitoring changes in the global hydrological cycle"
2024	Lixin Wu	"For exceptional, sustained contribution to studies of multi-scale ocean circulation dynamics and the roles they play in global climate change"
2025	Amy Bower	"For forging enhanced understanding of the ocean’s circulation, dynamics of deep flow pathways, and the meridional overturning"

== See also ==
- List of oceanography awards
