= Weglein =

Weglein is a surname. Notable people with this surname include:

- Arthur Weglein, American seismologist
- Clär Weglein (1895–1973), German music educator
- David E. Weglein (1876–1950), American educator
- Resi Weglein (1894–1977), German-Jewish nurse, survivor of Theresienstadt
