= Amy Bower =

American physical oceanographer

- Education: Tufts University (B.Sc.) University of Rhode Island (Ph.D.)
- Occupation: Physical oceanographer
- Employer: Woods Hole Oceanographic Institution
- Known for: Research on ocean circulation and for being one of the few blind oceanographers.
- Website: https://www2.whoi.edu/site/bower-lab

Amy Bower is an American physical oceanographer at Woods Hole Oceanographic Institution. She is known for her research on ocean circulation and for being one of the few blind oceanographers.

== Career ==
Bower received a Bachelor of Science degree in Physics at Tufts University and her PhD in Oceanography at the University of Rhode Island. Bower is a senior scientist at the Woods Hole Oceanographic Institution in Cape Cod, Massachusetts. She was the chair of the Physical Oceanography Department from 2018 to 2022.

== Research ==
Bower investigates large-scale ocean circulation systems, particularly thermohaline circulation (the so-called "ocean conveyor belt"), and how these currents transport heat and water around the globe. Bower and her team go on research cruises to deploy and retrieve hundreds of RAFOS floats—instruments that drift within different ocean layers and record movement patterns—to study deep currents in regions such as the Gulf of Mexico, Arctic, and Subpolar North Atlantic.

One of her major projects, Overturning in the Subpolar North Atlantic Program (OSNAP), investigates the mechanisms driving Atlantic Ocean circulation and its role in climate systems.

Bower is a member of the American Geophysical Union, the Oceanography Society, the American Meteorological Society, the European Geophysical Union, Sigma Xi, and the Society for Women in Marine Science.

== Disability and advocacy ==
Bower is legally blind, having lost much of her sight since her mid-twenties to juvenile macular degeneration and retinitis pigmentosa, and still has some light perception. Bower uses adaptive technology, such as a screen magnifier, screen readers, and sighted assistance, and uses a service dog for navigation. She advocates for improved accessibility tools and equal access to information for blind scientists. She started a partnership with Perkins School for the Blind to allow young blind students to fully participate in science classes and meet blind scientists, such as herself. "If they don't ever meet a blind scientist, they're never going to think that they can be one," she told Tufts Now. In 2007, Bower founded OceanInsight, an education outreach program for the blind and visually impaired.

== Awards ==
- Thomas J. Carroll Award for Employment, 2003
- Blind Employee of the Year in Massachusetts by the Carroll Center for the Blind and the Massachusetts Commission for the Blind, 2003
- Fellow of the American Meteorological Society, 2010
- Massachusetts Unsung Heroine Award, 2010
- Chrysalis Award, Center for Vision Loss, 2011
- University of Rhode Island Graduate School of Oceanography Dean's Achievement Award, 2014
- Henry Bryant Bigelow Chair for Excellence in Oceanography, WHOI, 2014
- Henry Stommel Research Award, the highest honor the American Meteorological Society (AMS) presents to oceanographers, 2025
