= Lynne Talley =

American oceanographer

- Born: May 18, 1954 (age 72); Schenectady, New York, U.S.
- Education: Marple-Newtown High School (1971) BA Physics, Oberlin College (1976) Bachelor of Music, Oberlin College (1977) PhD Massachusetts Institute of Technology / Woods Hole Oceanographic Institution (1982)
- Awards: Huntsman Award (2003)
- Scientific career
- Fields: Oceanography
- Workplaces: Scripps Institution of Oceanography, UCSD
- Website: ltalley.scrippsprofiles.ucsd.edu

Lynne Talley (born May 18, 1954) is a physical oceanographer at Scripps Institution of Oceanography known for her research into the large-scale circulation of water masses in the global ocean.

== Early life and education ==
Talley received a B.A. in physics in 1976 from Oberlin College and a Bachelor of Music (B.M.) in piano performance from Oberlin Conservatory of Music. The following year, she studied piano performance with Carl Seeman at the Hochschule für Musik Freiburg in Freiburg, Germany. She continued her studies at the New England Conservatory of Music. After moving to San Diego, she studied music at San Diego State University.

Talley started oceanographic research as a graduate student and completed a Ph.D. in physical oceanography from the Joint Program in Oceanography at the Massachusetts Institute of Technology and the Woods Hole Oceanographic Institution in 1982. After a postdoctoral research position at Oregon State University, she joined the Scripps Institution of Oceanography in 1984.

== Career and impact ==
Talley has worked at the Scripps Institution of Oceanography, University of California, San Diego since 1984, and was named a distinguished professor in 2012. While at Scripps, her research has combined analysis of ocean observations with advanced theoretical work to describe and map large-scale circulation. Her work involves analysis of data from most of the world's oceans, depicting the movement of heat, salinity, and water masses, and the formation of water masses, particularly in subpolar regions. In addition to academic publications, she has published a graduate level textbook on descriptive physical oceanography and two oceanographic atlases.

From 2004 to 2007 she was a lead author of the Intergovernmental Panel on Climate Change (IPCC) Working Group and a lead author of the Fourth Assessment Report Working Group I chapter of the group's final report titled: "Observations: Oceanic Climate Change and Sea Level", which was released in February 2007. The report earned contributing scientists a share of the Nobel Peace Prize later that year. She was also a lead author on the same topic for the Fifth Assessment Report.

Talley has a long history of seagoing experiences. In 2000, Talley and co-principal investigator, Daniel Rudnick, worked with moorings and hydrography on the collaborative Okhotsk Sea dense water formation project. In 2005-2006, Talley used hydrography, CTD, and profiling floats to understand Antarctic Intermediate Water formation in the southeast Pacific. Since 2016, Talley has led the observation team of the SOCCOM project: Southern Ocean Carbon and Climate Observations and Modeling (SOCCOM), which is deploying biogeochemical profiling Argo floats throughout the Southern Ocean south of 30S. Starting in 2020, Talley has been one of the principal investigators for the Global Ocean Biogeochemistry Array (GO-BGC), which has begun deploying biogeochemical Argo floats globally. She also continues as a principal investigator and member of the steering committee of the ongoing U.S. GO-SHIP, which organizes and carries out the U.S. component of the international GO-SHIP program of deep-sea hydrographic cruises throughout the world's oceans.

Talley received the Albatross Award which has passed from one oceanographer to the next since 1959 and was presented to Talley at the 2016 Ocean Sciences meeting.

In 2024 she was elected to the U.S. National Academy of Sciences.

== Honors ==
- 1987 - Presidential Young Investigator (National Science Foundation)
- 2001 - Rosenstiel Award (Rosenstiel School of Marine, Atmospheric, and Earth Science, University of Miami)
- 2003 - Fellow, American Academy of Arts and Sciences
- 2003 - Huntsman Award (Bedford Institute of Oceanography)
- 2006 - Fellow, American Geophysical Union
- 2008 - Fellow, American Meteorological Society
- 2010 - Fellow, The Oceanography Society
- 2016 - Fellow, American Association for the Advancement of Science
- 2017 - Prince Albert I Medal International Association for the Physical Sciences of the Oceans (IAPSO)
- 2017 - Fridtjof Nansen Medal (European Geosciences Union)
- 2017 - Henry Stommel Research Award (American Meteorological Society)
