= Harry Bryden =

American oceanographer (born 1946)

- Born: Harry Leonard Bryden; 9 July 1946 (age 80); Providence, Rhode Island, United States of America
- Education: Dartmouth College, Massachusetts Institute of Technology-Woods Hole Oceanographic Institution
- Known for: Thermohaline circulation
- Awards: Henry Stommel Research Award (2003); Prince Albert I Medal (2009); Fridtjof Nansen Medal (2013); Fellow of the American Meteorological Society (2003); Fellow of the Royal Society (2005); Fellow of the American Geophysical Union (2010); President of the Challenger Society (2010 to 2012); Honorary Fellow of the Royal Meteorological Society (2013)
- Scientific career
- Fields: Physical oceanographer
- Workplaces: Oregon State University (OSU), Woods Hole Oceanographic Institution (WHOI), National Institute of Oceanography (NIO), National Oceanography Centre, Southampton (NOCS)
- Doctoral advisor: Nick Fofonoff
- Website: www.southampton.ac.uk/oes/about/staff/hlb.page

Harry Leonard Bryden, FRS (born 9 July 1946) is an American physical oceanographer, professor at the University of Southampton, and staff at the National Oceanography Centre, Southampton. He is best known for his work in ocean circulation and in the role of the ocean in the Earth's climate.

== Early life and education ==
Born in Providence, Rhode Island in 1946, Bryden received his A.B. degree in mathematics from Dartmouth College. For a short period after graduation, he worked as a mathematician on oceanographic topics for offices of the United States Navy in Maryland and Connecticut. Bryden's doctoral training in oceanography was undertaken at the Massachusetts Institute of Technology (MIT) and the Woods Hole Oceanographic Institution (WHOI) through the long-standing joint program for students that operates between these institutes. During his time at MIT-WHOI, Bryden completed and published work on a number of topics including water mass properties, Mediterranean outflow and geostrophy. He was supervised initially by Henry Stommel and then principally by Nick Fofonoff, and his thesis title was "Momentum, Mass, Heat, and Vorticity Balances from Oceanic Measurements of Current and Temperature".

== Career ==
Upon competing his doctoral thesis, Bryden briefly moved to Oregon State University to work as a post-doctoral researcher, before returning to WHOI in 1977. He was awarded tenure at WHOI in 1983, and remained there until 1992, ultimately reaching the position of Senior Scientist. Bryden then moved to the United Kingdom and the Institute of Oceanographic Sciences (IOS), a unit funded by the Natural Environment Research Council (NERC). He moved with IOS to Southampton when it partnered with the University of Southampton to create the Southampton Oceanography Centre, and has remained with its successor institutes. Though partially retired, Bryden remains active at the University of Southampton in both research and the wider scientific community. Harry Bryden was appointed Regius Professor of Ocean Sciences at the University of Southampton in March 2020.

A particular focus of Bryden's research is the large-scale thermohaline circulation of the ocean, in particular its role in transporting heat. A decline in the strength of the Atlantic Meridional Overturning Circulation (AMOC) caused by global warming has been hypothesised, and Bryden and colleagues have studied this via the RAPID array that crosses the Atlantic at 26.5°N.

== Awards and honours ==
In 2003, Bryden both became a Fellow of the American Meteorological Society, and was awarded the society's Henry Stommel Research Award "for fundamental and elegant observational contributions to understanding the oceanic general circulation". In 2005, Bryden was elected a Fellow of the Royal Society. In 2009, he won the Prince Albert I Medal "in recognition of his fundamental contributions to understanding the ocean's role in the global climate system". In 2010, Bryden was elected a Fellow of the American Geophysical Union. Bryden served as president of the Challenger Society for Marine Science from 2010 to 2012. In late 2012, the European Geosciences Union awarded Bryden the 2013 Fridtjof Nansen Medal for his contributions to Earth sciences. In 2013, in recognition of his work, Bryden was elected an Honorary Fellow of the Royal Meteorological Society (RMetS).
