= Maurice Ewing Medal =

Maurice Ewing Medal / Award
- Description: Awards presented annually by two geophysical societies in honor of Maurice Ewing
- Country: United States
- Presented by: American Geophysical Union and Society of Exploration Geophysicists

Two international geophysical societies offer awards each year which are named in honor of Maurice Ewing; these are the American Geophysical Union and the Society of Exploration Geophysicists.

== AGU Ewing Medal ==
The Maurice Ewing Medal is awarded by the American Geophysical Union for "significant original contributions to the understanding of physical, geophysical, and geological processes in the ocean; to those who advance oceanographic engineering, technology, and instrumentation; and to those who perform outstanding service to the marine sciences". The award was instituted in 1974 and is jointly sponsored by the United States Navy.

Recipients
Year	Recipient
1976	Walter H. Munk
1977	Henry Stommel
1978	Edward Bullard
1979	Wallace Smith Broecker
1980	J. Tuzo Wilson
1981	Manik Talwani
1982	John I. Ewing
1983	Fred Noel Spiess
1984	Xavier Le Pichon
1985	Kenneth O. Emery
1986	John Imbrie
1987	William Jason Morgan
1988	Wolfgang H. Berger
1989	Klaus Wyrtki
1990	Carl I. Wunsch
1991	Charles David Keeling
1992	Charles Shipley Cox
1993	Kirk Bryan
1994	John A. Orcutt
1995	Jean-Guy Schilling
1996	Walter C. Pitman III
1997	Karl Turekian
1998	Richard P. Von Herzen
1999	Arnold L. Gordon
2000	Joseph L. Reid
2001	Richard G. Fairbanks
2002	Nicholas Shackleton
2003	Gerard C. Bond
2004	Bruce A. Warren
2005	Francois M. M. Morel
2006	G. Michael Purdy
2007	Marcia Kemper McNutt
2008	Miriam Kastner
2009	Thomas Rossby
2010	William J. Jenkins
2011	Joseph Pedlosky
2012	Ellen Thomas
2013	Mark Cane
2014	John Andrews Whitehead
2015	Russ E. Davis
2016	Peter George Brewer
2017	Donald W. Forsyth
2018	Nicklas G. Pisias
2019	Maureen E. Raymo
2020	Anthony Brian Watts
2021	Eelco J. Rohling
2022	Ana Christina Ravelo
2023	Charles H Langmuir
2024	Alan C Mix
2025	Zvi Ben-Avraham

== SEG Ewing Medal ==
The Maurice Ewing Medal of the Society of Exploration Geophysicists is awarded to one who is “deserving of SEG’s highest honor through having made distinguished contributions both to the advancement of the science and to the profession of exploration geophysics”.

Recipients
Year	Recipient
1978	Cecil Howard Green
1979	C. Hewitt Dix
1981	J. Tuzo Wilson
1982	Frank Press
1983	Harry Mayne
1984	L. L. Nettleton
1985	Nigel Anstey
1986	J. E. White
1987	Arthur A. Brant
1988	Franklyn K. Levin
1989	Sven Treitel
1990	Milo M. Backus
1991	Theodore C. Krey
1992	Jon Claerbout
1993	M. Turhan Taner
1995	Harold O. Seigel
1996	Ken Larner
1997	Thomas R. LaFehr
1998	Robert E. Sheriff
1999	Gerald H. F. Gardner
2000	Stanley H. Ward
2001	Enders A. Robinson
2002	Gordon F. West
2003	Guus Berkhout
2004	Vlastislav Cervený
2005	Robert J. Graebner
2006	Fred Hilterman
2007	Roy Oliver Lindseth
2008	John W. C. Sherwood
2009	David Strangway
2010	Anthony R. Barringer
2010	M. Nafi Toksöz
2011	Amos M. Nur
2012	George A. McMechan
2013	Peter Hubral
2014	Norman Bleistein
2015	Manik Talwani
2016	Arthur Weglein
2017	Samuel Gray
2018	Albert Tarantola
2019	Robert H. Stolt
2020	Leon Thomsen
2021	Rosemary Knight
2022	Öz Yılmaz
2023	Kurt J. Marfurt
2024	Mark Zoback
2025	Gary Mavko
2026	Craig Beasley

== See also ==
- List of geophysicists
- List of geophysics awards
- List of prizes named after people
