= Ellen Thomas (scientist) =

Dutch-born environmental scientist

Ellen Thomas (born 1950, Hengelo) is a Dutch-born environmental scientist and geologist specializing in marine micropaleontology and paleoceanography. She is the emerita Harold T Stearns Professor and the Smith Curator of Paleontology of the Joe Webb Peoples Museum of Natural History at Wesleyan University, and a senior research scientist at Yale University.

== Academic career and research ==
Thomas attended the University of Utrecht (BSc, 1971; MSc 1975; and PhD, 1979). Thomas studies environmental and climate change over geologic timescales, specializing in the study of benthic foraminifera. Thomas was the first scientist to discover a mass extinction in benthic foraminifera close to the Paleocene-Eocene boundary, now recognized as a result of the climate event known as the Paleocene–Eocene Thermal Maximum, for which she received the 2012 Maurice Ewing medal of the American Geophysical Union and Ocean Naval Research.

Thomas was editor-in-chief of the journal Paleoceanography and Paleoclimatology from 2015 to 2019, published by the American Geophysical Union.

== Awards and honors ==
- 2011 - Fellow AAAS (American Association for the Advancement of Science).
- 2012 - Maurice Ewing Medal of the American Geophysical Union.
- 2016 - Brady Medal of The Micropalaeontological Society.
- 2019 - Fellow GSA (Geological Society of America).
- 2020 - Joseph A. Cushman Medal for Excellence in Foraminiferal Research.
- 2022 - BBVA Foundation Frontiers of Knowledge Award. in Climate Change, shared with J. C. Zachos
