= Nicklas G. Pisias =

American oceanographer

Nicklas G. Pisias is an American oceanographer. He is a fellow of the American Geophysical Union and a recipient 2018 of the Maurice Ewing Medal. His research was described by Larry Mayer as representing "a sustained level of excellence that has led to many new and profound insights into our understanding of the oceans and climate system".
