= Alfred Groß =

Former Mayor of Erlangen (1934–1944)

Alfred J. Gross
- Born: 1893
- Died: 1949 (aged 55–56)
- Occupations: Engenheiro de comunicações, inventor
- Known for: Inventou o Walkie-talkie, o Pager e o telefone sem fio
- Awards: Lemelson–MIT Prize (2001)

Alfred Groß (1893–1949) was a district leader and mayor of Erlangen (Germany) during Nazism. He was member of the Nazi party (NSDAP).

He was born in Bamberg and trained as a school teacher. After a pausing his career during his fighting in World War I, he resumed teaching in Erlangen.

In 1925 he joined the NSDAP and became district leader of the local area. With Hitler gaining power in 1933, Groß participated in the Nazi book burning in Erlangen and was appointed as deputy mayor of Erlangen in 1933, rising to the position of mayor one year later and replacing his precursor Hans Flierl. In 1938, Groß was sent to Graz to organize the Nazi Party. In 1944, he was deposed in favor of Herbert Ohly who remained mayor until the end of the war in 1945. During this time Groß was again serving as district leader of Erlangen.
