= Carl Wunsch =

American oceanographer

Carl Isaac Wunsch
- Born: May 5, 1941 (age 85); Brooklyn, United States of America
- Education: Massachusetts Institute of Technology
- Scientific career
- Fields: Oceanography, Geophysics, Statistics
- Workplaces: Massachusetts Institute of Technology, Harvard University
- Thesis: On the scale of the long period tides (1966)
- Doctoral advisor: Henry Stommel
- Website: puddle.mit.edu/~cwunsch/

Carl Wunsch was the Cecil and Ida Green Professor of Physical Oceanography at the Massachusetts Institute of Technology, until he retired in 2013. He is known for his early work in internal waves and more recently for research into the effects of ocean circulation on climate.

== Career ==
Wunsch received his Ph.D. in Geophysics at the Massachusetts Institute of Technology in 1966. He began teaching there in 1967, achieving tenure in 1970, and was named Cecil and Ida Green Professor of Physical Oceanography in 1976.

== Climate change ==
Wunsch was one of the scientists interviewed in the controversial documentary The Great Global Warming Swindle, but he complained that his views were grossly distorted by context.

== Selected honors ==
- 1978 - Member, National Academy of Sciences
- 1979 - Fellow, American Academy of Arts and Sciences
- 1981-1982 - Fulbright Scholar
- 1990 - Maurice Ewing Medal, American Geophysical Union and U.S. Navy
- 2000 - Henry Stommel Research Award, American Meteorological Society
- 2002 - Foreign Member, Royal Society of London
- 2003 - Member of the American Philosophical Society
- 2006 - William Bowie Medal, American Geophysical Union
- 2021 - Prince Albert I Medal (IAPSO) (IAPSO list of medal winners)
- 2025 - BBVA Foundation Frontiers of Knowledge Award in the category "Climate Change".

== Selected publications ==
- Carl Wunsch, Discrete Inverse and State Estimation Problems, 2006. ISBN 0-521-85424-5
- Carl Wunsch, The Ocean Circulation Inverse Problem, 1996. ISBN 0-521-48090-6
- Walter Munk, Peter Worcester, and Carl Wunsch, Ocean Acoustic Tomography, Cambridge University Press, 1995. ISBN 0-521-47095-1
