= Prince Albert I Medal =

- Country: Monaco
- Status: Active
- Established: 8 February 2001
- First award: October 2001

The Prince Albert I Medal was established by Prince Rainier of Monaco in partnership with the International Association for the Physical Sciences of the Oceans. The medal was named for Prince Albert I and is given for significant work in the physical and chemical sciences of the oceans. The medal is awarded biannually by IAPSO at its Assemblies.

== Past recipients ==
- 2001: Walter Munk
- 2003: Klaus Wyrtki
- 2005: Friedrich Schott
- 2007: Russ Davis
- 2009: Harry Bryden
- 2011: Trevor McDougall
- 2013: Arnold L. Gordon
- 2015: Toshio Yamagata
- 2017: Lynne Talley
- 2019: Corinne Le Quéré
- 2021: Carl Wunsch
- 2023: John Alexander Church
