= Joseph L. Reid =

American oceanographer

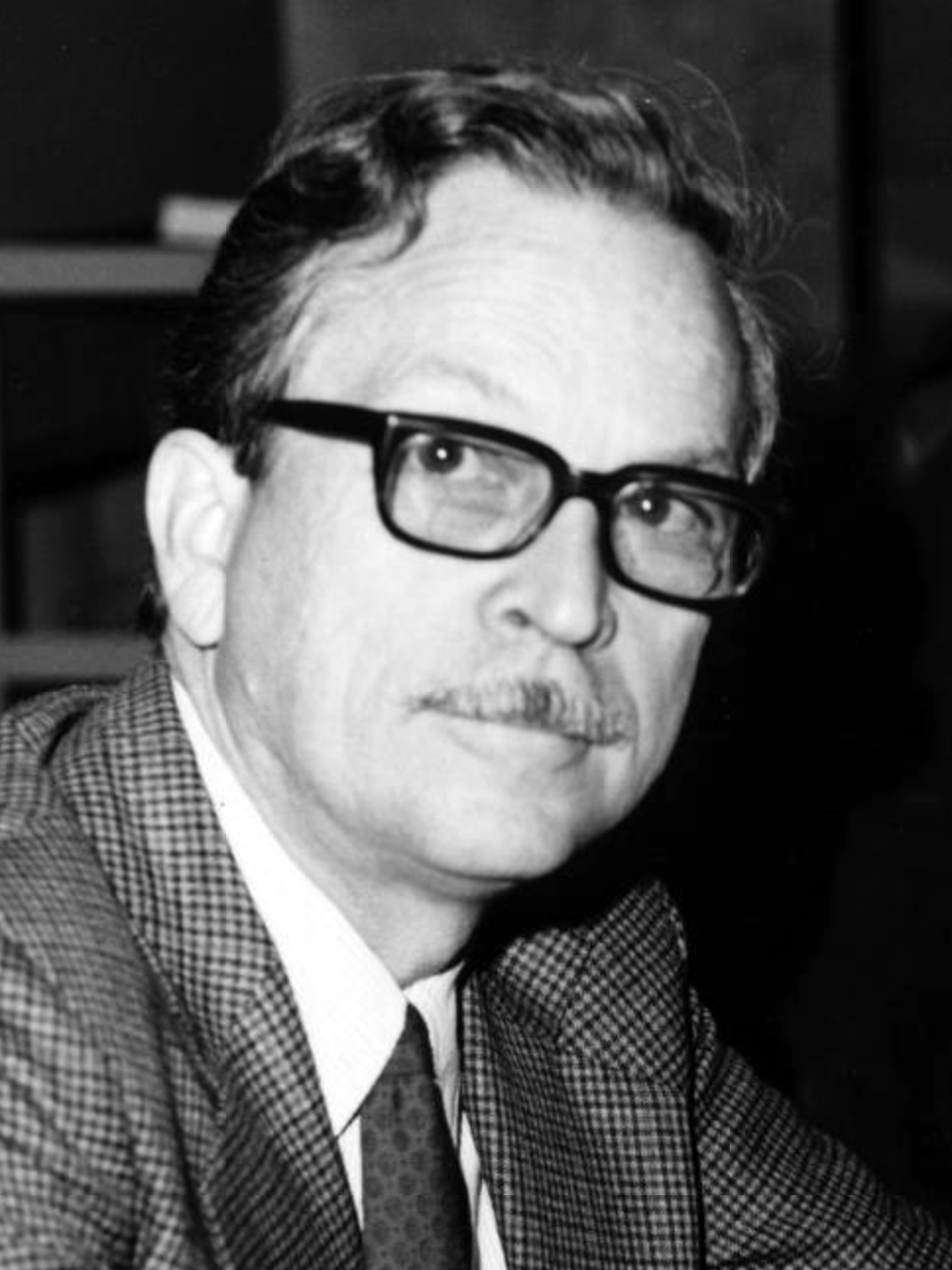
- Born: February 7, 1923; Franklin, Texas
- Died: April 2, 2015 (aged 92); Del Mar, California
- Citizenship: American
- Education: University of Texas; Scripps Institution of Oceanography
- Known for: Ocean circulation
- Awards: Alexander Agassiz Medal (1992); Henry Stommel Research Award (1996); Maurice Ewing Medal (2000); Albatross Award of the American Miscellaneous Society (1988)
- Scientific career
- Workplaces: Scripps Institution of Oceanography; University of California, San Diego

Joseph L. Reid (February 7, 1923 – April 2, 2015) was an American oceanographer. He was professor emeritus of physical oceanography at the Scripps Institution of Oceanography in La Jolla, California.

== Early life ==
Joseph Reid was born in Franklin, Texas, on February 7, 1923. He served in the United States Navy during World War II aboard the USS Stockdale. Following the war, he became interested in studying the oceans and received his bachelor's in mathematics from the University of Texas in 1942.

Reid joined the Scripps Institution of Oceanography in 1948 and completed his Master's in physical oceanography in 1950.

== Research career ==
While a student at Scripps in 1949, Reid participated in one of the first CalCOFI cruises and continued to describe his field of interest as the California Current for the rest of his career. He justified his research in other basins or environments as "tributaries" of the California Current system, as the boundaries of the original CalCOFI survey were not enough to describe all of the influences on it.

Reid's breakthrough as a researcher and scientific coordinator arose in 1955 for the NORPAC expedition. Reid organized 19 research vessels to take measurements across the Pacific which informed scientists of large-scale spatial distributions and helped better understand the California Current.

Reid had a very limited amount of classified work associated with the Office of Naval Research or the U.S. Navy as an oceanographer. In 1955 he participated in the Wigwam test, taking temperature and salinity measurements following detonation.

In the late 1960s, Reid joined the initial panel of GEOSECS led by Arnold E. Bainbridge. The GEOSECS program outlined a number of research cruises focusing on chemical oceanography and tracers.

== Scientific philosophy ==
Reid described his research as observation-driven, emphasizing the value of observations and shortcomings of models and ocean theory in the 20th century.

Nobody's yet been able to find a way to combine all of these principle ideas to get the right results. It's tough. So mine is mostly observation. That is, I'm trying to show what is going on. Now, why it's going on, I'm interested in, of course, but I can't wait to "why," because "why" is a very complicated answer.

— Joseph Reid, 2000
