= Richard G. Fairbanks =

Richard G. Fairbanks is an American geologist. A fellow of the Geological Society of America, he won a Maurice Ewing Medalin 2001 and a Rosenstiel Award for his research.
