= Susan Lozier =

Physical oceanographer

M. Susan Lozier
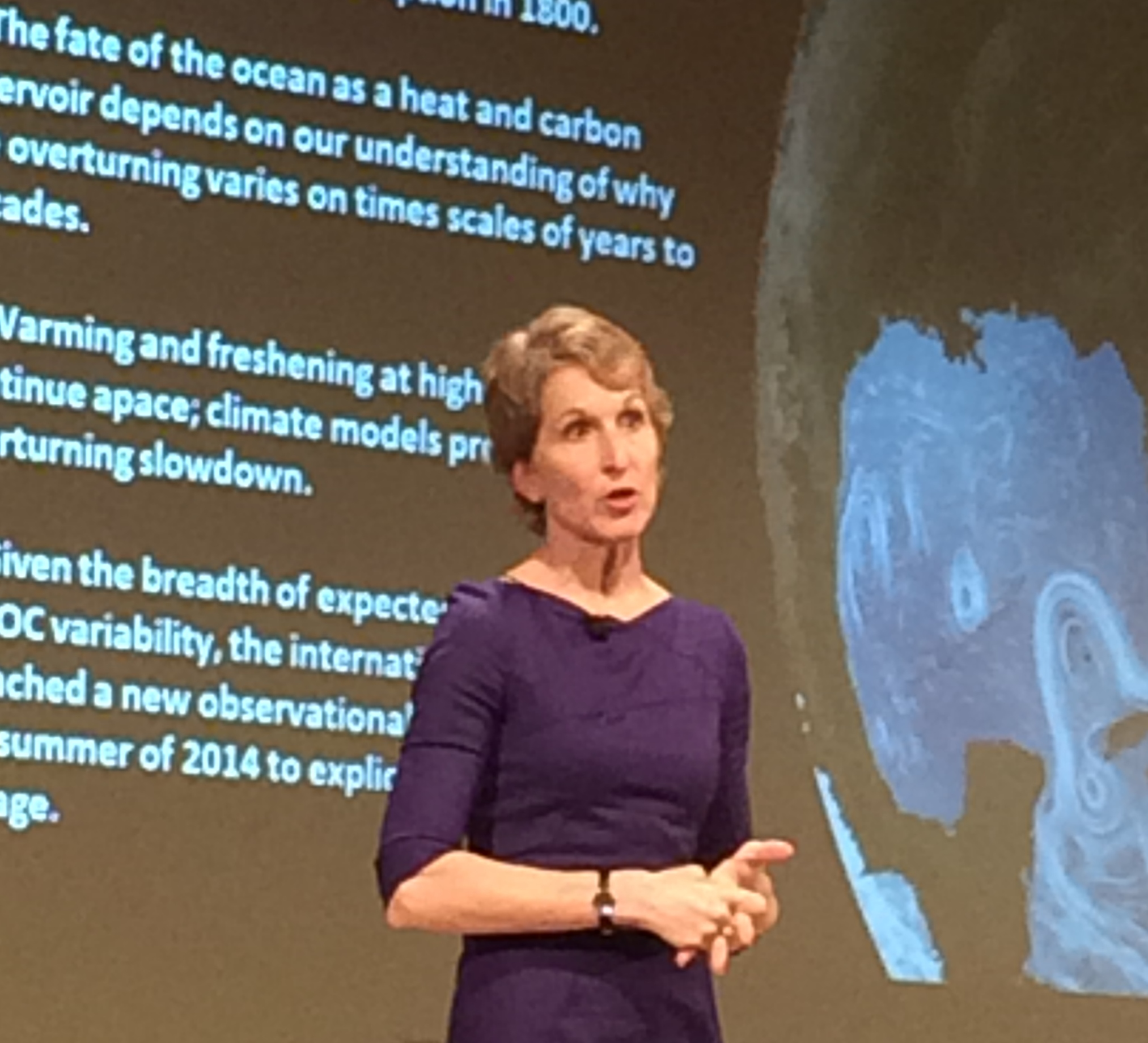
- Oceanographer Susan Lozier giving the Sixteenth Annual Roger Revelle Commemorative Lecture of the National Academies, at the National Museum of Natural History in Washington, D.C.
- Education: Purdue University; University of Washington
- Known for: Study of large-scale ocean circulation
- Awards: AGU Ambassador Award (2016)
- Scientific career
- Fields: Oceanography
- Workplaces: Georgia Institute of Technology
- Thesis: Potential vorticity dynamics of a quasigeostrophic ocean : a Lagrangian perspective (1989)

Susan Lozier is a physical oceanographer and the dean of the Georgia Institute of Technology's College of Sciences. Previously, she was the Ronie-Richelle Garcia-Johnson Professor of Earth and Ocean Sciences in the Nicholas School of the Environment at Duke University in Durham, North Carolina. Her research focuses on large-scale ocean circulation, the ocean's role in climate variability, and the transfer of heat and fresh water from one part of the ocean to another.

== Education ==
Lozier received her Bachelor of Science degree from Purdue University in 1979, and her Master of Science (1984) and Doctor of Philosophy (1989) degrees from the University of Washington.

== Professional work ==
Lozier was a post-doctoral fellow at the Woods Hole Oceanographic Institution before joining the faculty at Duke University. She is a principal investigator for the Overturning in the Subpolar North Atlantic Program (OSNAP), responsible for coordinating its international and national projects. Lozier was the first woman to graduate from the University of Washington's physical oceanography doctoral program, and is active in the community mentoring program, MPOWIR (Mentoring Physical Oceanography Women to Increase Retention). In 2020 she was elected to the American Academy of Arts and Sciences.

Lozier was the featured speaker for the 16th Annual Roger Revelle Annual Commemorative Lecture, sponsored by the National Academies and held at the National Museum of Natural History in Washington, D.C., on March 4, 2015, presenting her lecture on Overturning Assumptions: Past, Present, and Future Concerns about the Ocean's Circulation.

Lozier started a two-year term as president of the American Geophysical Union in 2021.

== Select publications ==
- Lozier, M. Susan (15 January 2012). "Overturning in the North Atlantic". Annual Review of Marine Science. 4 (1): 291–315. Bibcode:2012ARMS....4..291L. doi:10.1146/annurev-marine-120710-100740. PMID 22457977.
- Lozier, M. S. (18 June 2010). "Deconstructing the Conveyor Belt". Science. 328 (5985): 1507–1511. Bibcode:2010Sci...328.1507L. doi:10.1126/science.1189250. PMID 20558705. S2CID 5268993.
- Lozier, Susan (January 2009). "Overturning assumptions". Nature Geoscience. 2 (1): 12–13. doi:10.1038/ngeo402.

== Awards ==
- Rachel Carson Award Lecture, American Geophysical Union (2001)
- Ambassador Award, American Geophysical Union (2016)
- Joanne Simpson Mentorship Award, American Meteorological Society (2017)
- Member, American Academy of Arts and Sciences (2020)
