= Zvi Ben-Avraham =

Israeli geophysicist

- צבי בן-אברהם
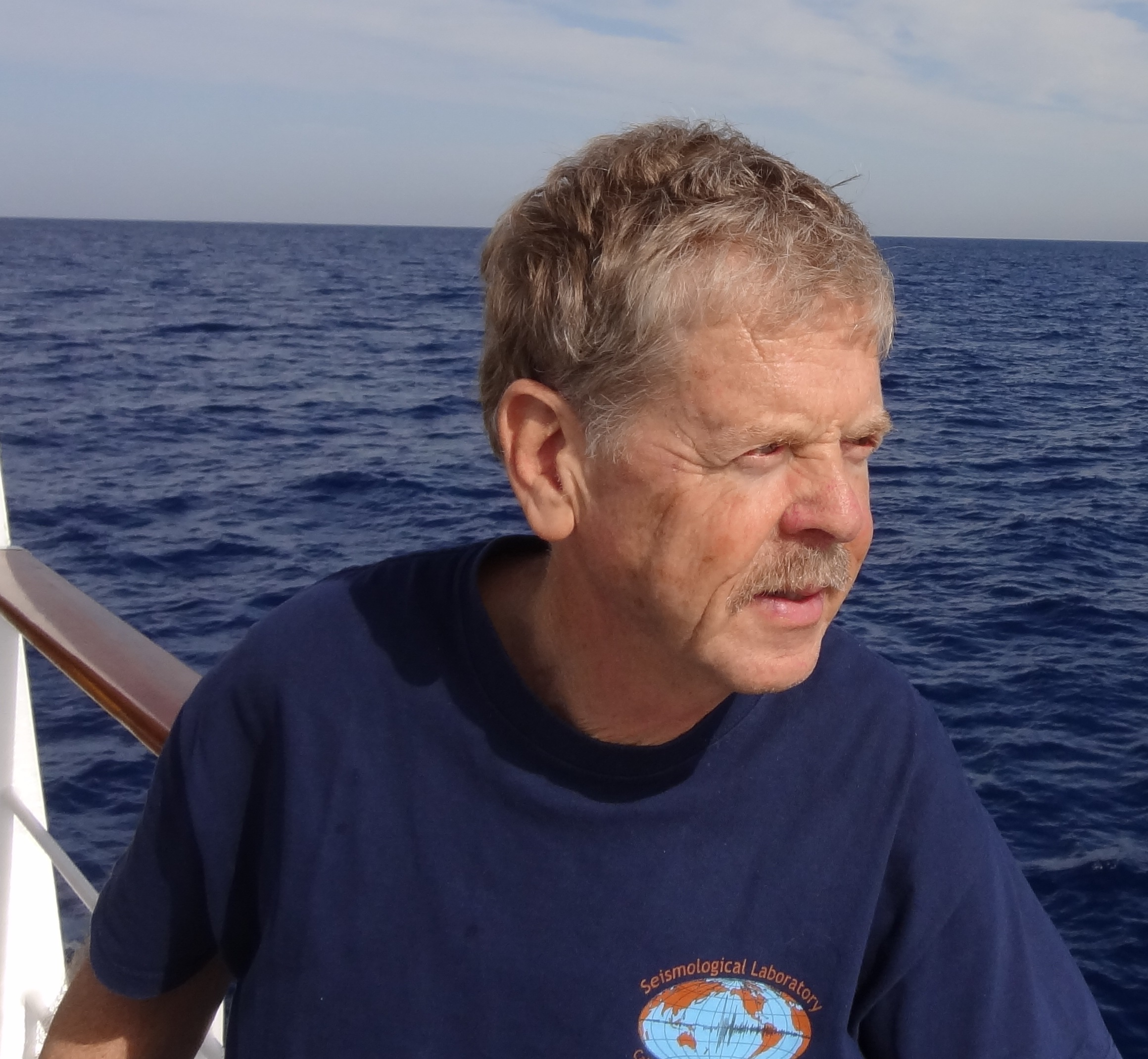
- Born: 16 November 1941 (age 84); Jerusalem
- Education: Hebrew University of Jerusalem (BSc), Massachusetts Institute of Technology and Woods Hole Oceanographic Institution (PhD)
- Occupation: Scientist
- Awards: Israel Prize (2003)

Zvi Ben-Avraham (Hebrew: צבי בן-אברהם; born 16 November 1941) is an Israeli earth scientist, specializing in geophysics of the Mediterranean Sea and the Dead Sea Transform. He is currently a professor of Geophysics at Tel Aviv University. Ben-Avraham was awarded the Israel Prize in 2003. He is member of several national academies and fellow of geological societies.

== Career ==
Ben-Avraham was born on 16 November 1941 in Jerusalem. He studied geology at the Hebrew University of Jerusalem and obtained a BSc with honors there in 1969. He subsequently obtained a PhD at the Massachusetts Institute of Technology and Woods Hole Oceanographic Institution in 1973. He shortly continued as a post-doc at the latter institution before moving on to the Israel Oceanographic and Limnological Research to work as senior research fellow.

In 1975 he started as researcher at the department of mathematics of the Weizmann Institute of Science. The next year he became senior researcher and in 1981 he became associate professor. From 1979 to 1982 Ben-Avraham was visiting associate professor at the department of geophysics at Stanford University, and subsequently worked there as professor until 1989. In 1982 he also started as associate professor of geophysics at Tel Aviv University, in 1986 he became a full professor. Since 1989 Ben-Avraham has been Max Sonnenberg Professor of Marine Geoscience at the University of Cape Town.

In 2007 Ben-Avraham started as the first director of the Leon H. Charney School of Marine Sciences at the University of Haifa. Five years later he also became head of the Mediterranean Sea Research Center of Israel. He also works at the Minerva Dead Sea Research Center. In this capacity a team under his guidance has taken samples from the sea bottom to determine its history. He has helped in setting up a Dead Sea Research center in Jordan with help of its royal family.

In 2011 Ben-Avraham discovered that fault-finding coral reefs could provide indications on where future earthquakes could take places.

In 2015 Ben-Avraham and Emanuele Lodolo discovered an at least 9,350 year-old monolith of the coast of Sicily.

Ben-Avraham's field of expertise lies in the geophysics of the Mediterranean Sea and the Dead Sea Transform. He frequently combines his study of geophysics with oceanography. Ben-Avraham has worked as a chief scientist on board EV Nautilus during its explorations.

== Awards and honours ==
In 1981 Ben-Avraham became a fellow of the Geological Society of America. In 1996 he became a foreign member of the Academia Europaea. Ben-Avraham was elected a fellow of the American Geophysical Union in 1999. He became a corresponding member of the Heidelberg Academy of Sciences and Humanities in 2000.

In 2000 Ben-Avraham was elected a member of the Israel Academy of Sciences and Humanities. In 2003 he was awarded the Israel Prize in earth sciences. The jury praised him for his exploring skills, knowledge of innovative research methods and data-collecting and management capabilities. Ben-Avraham was elected a foreign member of the Royal Netherlands Academy of Arts and Sciences in 2006. Ben-Avraham has won several awards from the Israel Geological Society, in 2014 he became an honorary member of the society. Ben-Avraham was elected foreign member of the Russian Academy of Sciences in 2019.

In 2025, he was awarded the Maurice Ewing Medal by the American Geophysical Union.
