= Global Ocean Ship-based Hydrographic Investigations Program =

Research project

GO-SHIP (The Global Ocean Ship-based Hydrographic Investigations Program) is a multidisciplinary project to monitor ocean/climate changes. So far, this program has involved twelve countries and completed/planned 116 cruises. Participating countries are United States, United Kingdom, Japan, Canada, Germany, Spain, Australia, Norway, France, South Africa, Ireland and Sweden. Most of the cruises are completed by United States, United Kingdom, Japan, Canada, Germany and Spain.

== Background ==
During 1872 and 1876, Challenger expedition started the modern marine survey and marked the foundation of oceanography. Since then, scientific exploration of the oceans have made many discoveries. At the end of the 19th century, America built the USS Albatross to carry out ocean surveys. In 1893, Norwegian scientist Fridtjof Nansen fixed his Fram in the Arctic ice-cap for three years to undertake long-term observations of oceanographic, meteorological and astronomical data. One of the first acoustic measurements of the ocean floor was in 1919. From 1925 to 1927, the Meteor expedition used echo sounders to measure 70000 ocean depth measurements and explore the Mid-Atlantic Ridge. In 1953, Maurice Ewing and Bruce Heezen discovered the global ridge system extending along the Mid Atlantic Ridge. In 1960, Harry Hammond Hess developed the seafloor spreading theory by ocean exploration.Deep Sea Drilling Project started in 1968. In the recent years, oceanographic investigation has revealed that ocean environment is changing, like Ocean acidification, water temperature, Carbon cycle, Sea level rise. Oceanographers are trying to find solutions to these changes by ocean exploration. However, it is hard to understand the whole system in one single subject because the ocean environment is balanced by both its physical conditions and chemical conditions, which is an essential factor for the diversities of marine biology. For example, if the temperature in the ocean surface rises, it would affect the Nutrients distributions, Mixed layer depth, Ocean current, pH conditions, Salinity distributions and so on. Those series of ocean environment changes could even cause dramatic decrease of some Species and effect on the entire Food web in the ocean. Scientists have many assumptions and predictions about the consequences of climate changes in ocean but only by long-term ocean exploration can testify these assumptions.

On the other hand, the ocean is large, which accounts for about 97.2% of the Earth's water resources and covers more than 70% of the Earth's surface (Water distribution on Earth), and connected with each other. If one of the oceans changes, the others would also be influenced. Thus it is necessary to use global ocean data to measure how one change can have influence on the others. However, ocean exploration is costly and no single country can afford continuous yearly global ocean cruises themselves. Therefore, GO-SHIP as one of global ocean observation and exploration programs was launched. Except for GO-SHIP, there are other programs such as World Ocean Circulation Experiment, Tropical Ocean Global Atmosphere program, Argo (oceanography), NPOCE, Global Ocean Observing System and International Ocean Discovery Program.

== Contributions and discoveries ==
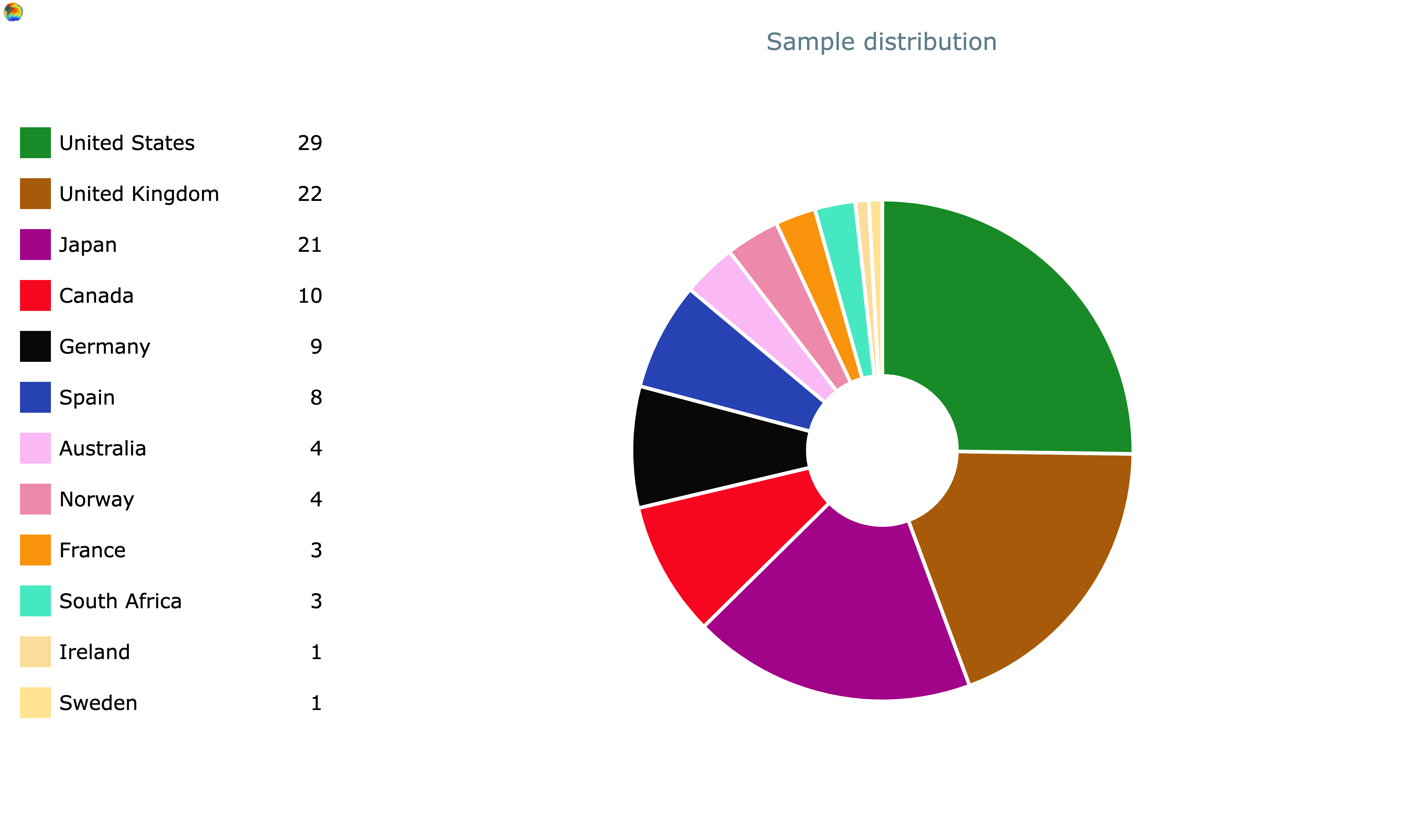
GO-SHIP countries and implemented cruises from 2015 to 2022

GO-SHIP data have suggested that from the 1990s to 2000 the deep (z > 2000 m) has warmed by absorbing some of the extra heat in system... The GO-SHIP global sampling has proven that the warming is obviously larger in regions of the Antarctic Bottom Water (AABW) especially the Southern Ocean near AABW An anthropogenic storage rate of 2.9 (± 0.4) Pg C year-1 for the most recent decade. An ocean mean annual uptake rate equates to approximately 27% of the total anthropogenic carbon emissions over 1994 to 2010.

== Global Cruise Plan ==
The Cruise Plan includes completed and planned during 2014–2027.The table was updated in May 2022
