= Arthur Weglein =

- Born: Arthur Benjamin Weglein
- Occupation: university professor
- Title: Hugh Roy and Lillie Cranz Cullen Distinguished Professor
- Awards: Townsend Harris Medal, 2008; Reginald Fessenden Award, SEG, 2010; Maurice Ewing Medal, SEG, 2016

Academic background
- Education: City College of New York; The Graduate Center of the City of New York

Academic work
- Discipline: Theoretical Physics
- Sub-discipline: Mathematical Physics / Inverse Scattering
- Institutions: University of Houston
- Website: arthurbweglein.com

Arthur Weglein is an American theoretical physicist. He holds the Hugh Roy & Lillie Cranz Cullen Distinguished University Chair in Physics at the University of Houston, and director of its Mission-oriented Seismic Research Program. He received the Townsend Harris Medal of the City College of New York in 2008 for his contributions to seismology. He received the Reginald Fessenden Award of the Society of Exploration Geophysicists in 2010. He received the Maurice Ewing Medal of the Society of Exploration Geophysicists in 2016.

== Education ==
Weglein received his BS in mathematics (1964) and MA in physics (1969) from the City College of New York. His PhD in physics from the Graduate Center of the City of New York was awarded in 1975. His thesis was entitled "Optimized Average Excited States of Atoms: Intermediate Energy Scattering", and his adviser was Marvin H. Mittleman.

== Books ==
- Stolt, Robert H.; Weglein, Arthur B. (2012). Seismic imaging and inversion : application of linear inverse theory. Cambridge University Press. ISBN 9781107014909.
