= Hans Flierl =

German politician, jurist and lawyer (1885–1974)

Hans Flierl (19 October 1885 – 21 August 1974) was a German jurist and local politician. From 1929 to 1934, he was the mayor of Erlangen.

== Biography ==
Flierl was born on 19 October 1885, in Forchheim. After graduating from high school in Schweinfurt, Hans Flierl studied law and political science at the University of Erlangen, the Friedrich Wilhelm University of Berlin, and the Ludwig-Maximilians-Universität München. In 1904, he became a member of the Corps Bavaria Erlangen. In 1907, he received his doctorate in law. After he had passed the Bavarian examination for the higher judicial and administrative service in 1910, he initially worked as a lawyer for several years. In 1915, he was appointed state attorney in Landshut and in 1918 legal council in Erlangen. One year later, in 1919, he was elected 2nd Mayor and in July 1929 1st Mayor of the city of Erlangen. In 1932, his title was changed to lord mayor. He remained in office until succeeded by Nazi Party member Alfred Groß in 1934. Flierl died on 21 August 1974, aged 88, in Erlangen.

== Awards and Recognitions ==
- 1932: Appointed honorary citizen of the University of Erlangen
- 1962: Appointed honorary citizen of the city of Erlangen
