= Overturning in the Subpolar North Atlantic Program =

International research project

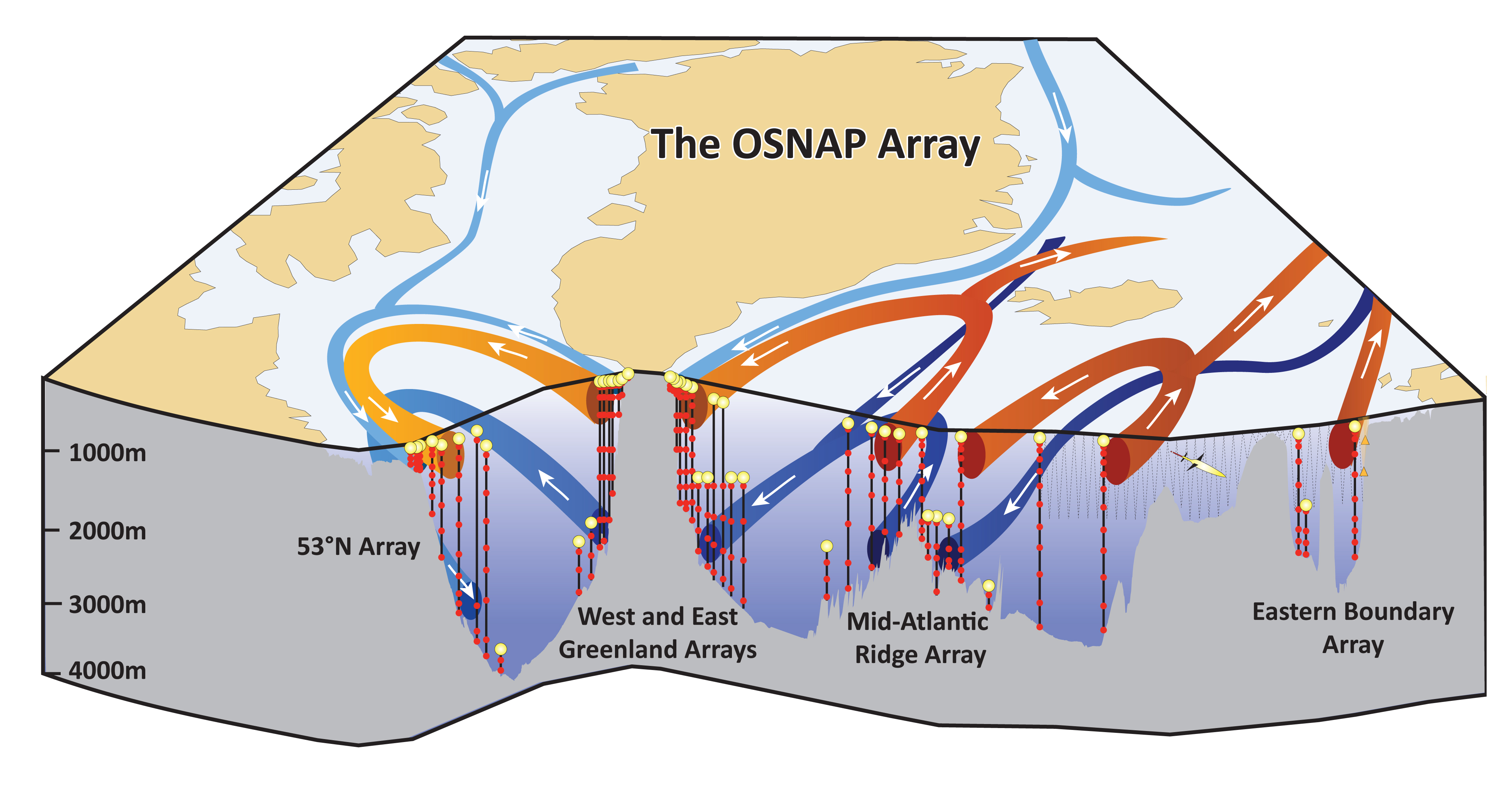
OSNAP array schematic

The Overturning in the Subpolar North Atlantic Program (OSNAP) is an international project designed to study the mechanistic link between water mass transformation at high latitudes and the meridional overturning circulation in the North Atlantic (AMOC) on interannual time scales. Though this linkage is evident in climate models on decadal time scales, to date there has been no clear demonstration of AMOC variability in response to changes in deep water formation on interannual and decadal time scales. OSNAP intends to fill that gap by providing a continuous record of the trans-basin fluxes of heat, mass and freshwater for a comparison to records of convective activity and water mass transformation at high latitudes in the North Atlantic.

The OSNAP observing system, fully deployed in the summer of 2014, consists of moorings, gliders and RAFOS floats spanning the subpolar North Atlantic from Labrador to Greenland to Scotland. Measurement contributions come from the US, the UK, Germany, the Netherlands, Canada, China and France. Vigorous boundary currents crossing the OSNAP line are directly measured in the Labrador and Irminger Seas by current meter arrays, and over the eastern flank of the Reykjanes Ridge by deep arrays. Geostrophic currents in the basin interior are estimated using temperature and salinity measurements from moorings and gliders. The AMOC is calculated on the basis of the directly measured boundary currents, the geostrophic currents and the Ekman transports estimated from the surface wind stress.

In conjunction with the RAPID/MOCHA array at 26⁰N, the EU THOR/NACLIM program and other observational elements, OSNAP will provide a comprehensive measure of the three-dimensional AMOC in the North Atlantic and an understanding of what drives its variability. The first OSNAP data products are expected in the fall of 2017.

== See also ==
- Thermohaline circulation
- RAPID/MOCHA Array Rapid Climate Change-Meridional Overturning Circulation and Heatflux Array
- RAFOS float
- Geostrophic current
