= Bruce A. Warren =

Bruce A. Warren was an American oceanographer. He was elected a fellow of the American Geophysical Union and the American Meteorological Society. He won a Maurice Ewing medal. Warren was described by Gregory C. Johnson as a "renowned physical oceanographer who was primarily responsible for the discovery, analysis, and dynamical interpretation of multiple deep currents throughout the world ocean".
