= Arnold L. Gordon =

Arnold L. Gordon is an American oceanographer who taught at Columbia University. He received his BS from Lehman College in 1961 and his PhD from Columbia University in 1965. He is a fellow of the Oceanography Society, the American Association for the Advancement of Science, the American Geophysical Union and the American Meteorological Society. He won an Maurice Ewing Medal in 1999 and a Henry Stommel Research Award in 2020.
