= Glenn R. Flierl =

American oceanographer

Glenn Richard Flierl
- Education: Harvard University; Oberlin College
- Awards: Henry Stommel Research Award; Fellow of the American Geophysical Union
- Scientific career
- Workplaces: Massachusetts Institute of Technology
- Thesis: Gulf Stream Meandering, Ring Formation and Ring Propagation (1975)
- Doctoral advisor: Allan Richard Robinson

Glenn Richard Flierl (born 1948) is Professor of Oceanography at the Department of Earth, Atmospheric and Planetary Sciences, Massachusetts Institute of Technology, Cambridge, Massachusetts. In 1970, he received his B.A. in Physics from Oberlin College and in 1975 his Ph.D. in Physics from Harvard University. Advised by Allan Richard Robinson, he graduated with the dissertation "Gulf Stream Meandering, Ring Formation and Ring Propagation". He joined the faculty at MIT in 1976.

== Research ==
He is known for fundamental insights into the dynamics of vortices and geostrophic turbulence and their impact on marine ecosystems.

He is also known for informing and inspiring the public about marine science. For example, he explains unusual ocean features, like paired eddies, in the Newsweek article "Double Whirlpools Found Spinning Across Hundreds of Miles in the Ocean Seen for the First Time".

== Awards ==
In 2014, Glenn R. Flierl was elected a Fellow of the American Geophysical Union. He received the Henry Stommel Research Award of the American Meteorological Society in 2015.

== Selected publications ==
- O'Neill, M. E.; Emanuel, K. A.; Flierl, G. R. (2015). "Polar vortex formation in giant-planet atmospheres dues to moist convection". Nature Geoscience. 8 (7): 523–526. Bibcode:2015NatGe...8..523O. doi:10.1038/ngeo2459. hdl:1721.1/100773.
- Chen, R.; Flierl, G. R. (2015). "The Contribution of Striations to the Eddy Energy Budget and Mixing: Diagnostic Frameworks and Results in a Quasigeostrophic Barotropic System with Mean Flow". Journal of Physical Oceanography. 45 (8): 2095–2113. Bibcode:2015JPO....45.2095C. doi:10.1175/jpo-d-14-0199.1. hdl:1721.1/101391.
- Chen, R.; Flierl, G. R.; Wunsch, C. (2015). "Quantifying and Interpreting Striations in a Subtropical Gyre: A Spectral Perspective". Journal of Physical Oceanography. 45 (2): 387–406. Bibcode:2015JPO....45..387C. doi:10.1175/jpo-d-14-0038.1. hdl:1721.1/98013.
- Flierl, Glenn R. (2006). Mathematical Modeling of the Physics and Biology of the Ocean (2nd ed.). Cambridge University Press. ISBN 978-0521533737.
