= International Association for the Physical Sciences of the Oceans =

International non-governmental organization

- IAPSO
- Abbreviation: IAPSO
- Formation: 1919
- Type: INGO
- Region served: Worldwide
- Official language: English
- President: Hans van Haren Netherlands
- Parent organization: International Union of Geodesy and Geophysics
- Website: IAPSO Official website

The International Association for the Physical Sciences of the Oceans (IAPSO) is one of eight associations of the International Union of Geodesy and Geophysics (IUGG), constituted within the International Science Council (ISC). It was founded in 1919 as an oceanographic section of the IUGG and renamed an association in 1931. IAPSO is the primary body responsible for maintaining and improving oceanographic standards and practices. The president of IAPSO is Dr. Hans van Haren.

== IAPSO’s Goal and Objectives ==
IAPSO’s prime goal is "promoting the study of scientific problems relating to the oceans and the interactions taking places at the sea floor, coastal, and atmospheric boundaries insofar as such research is conducted by the use of mathematics, physics, and chemistry." This goal is addressed through four objectives:

- Organization, sponsorship, and co-sponsorship of formal and informal international events to facilitate communication of ocean scientists throughout the world;
- Establishment of commissions, sub-committees, and organization of commensurate workshops to support and coordinate new and advanced international research activities;
- Provision of services needed to conduct the physical sciences of the oceans;
- Publishing proceedings of the conducted events and fundamental references on the current state-of-the art and knowledge of physical sciences of the oceans.

== Awards and honors ==
=== Prince Albert I Medal ===
The IAPSO Prince Albert I Medal is provided by the Foundation Rainier III of Monaco every two years to scientists for outstanding contributions to the physical sciences of the oceans. In 2023 the recipient of the IAPSO Prince Albert I Medal was Prof. John A. Church, Emeritus Professor at the University of New South Wales, Australia, for his outstanding contributions to sea level research and related new insights into climate change.

=== Eugene LaFond Medal ===
The Eugene LaFond Medal is awarded to ocean scientists from developing countries for presentation (poster or oral) in a IAPSO-sponsored or co-sponsored symposium at the IUGG or IAPSO assemblies. In 2023 The Eugene LaFond Medal 2023 was awarded at the IUGG General Assembly in Berlin, July 11–20, 2023 to Dr. Helenice Vital from Brazil.

=== IAPSO Early Career Scientist Medal ===
The award is granted every two years to early career scientists for outstanding research in physical and chemical oceanography and for their cooperation in international research. In 2023, Dr. Malte F. Stuecker, from the Department of Oceanography & International Pacific Research Center, University of Hawai‘i at Manoa, Honolulu, USA, became the recipient of the IAPSO Early Career Scientist medal in physical oceanography.
