= Susan Wijffels =

Australian oceanographer (born 1965)

- Born: Australia
- Occupations: senior scientist, Woods Hole Oceanographic Institution
- Known for: research in global ocean changes

Academic background
- Education: Massachusetts Institute of Technology, Flinders University

Academic work
- Discipline: oceanography
- Institutions: Woods Hole Oceanographic Institution

Susan Elizabeth Anne Wijffels (born 3 August 1965) is an Australian oceanographer employed by the Woods Hole Oceanographic Institution (WHOI); she formerly worked from the Commonwealth Scientific and Industrial Research Organisation (CSIRO) in Australia. Wijffels specialises in quantifying global ocean change over the past 50 years, including its anatomy and drivers. She is recognised for her international and national leadership of the Global Ocean Observing System. She is regarded as an expert in the Indonesian Throughflow and its role in global climate.

== Education ==
- BSc (First Class Hons), Flinders University, South Australia (1986)
- PhD Massachusetts Institute of Technology-Woods Hole Oceanographic Institution Joint Program in Oceanography and Oceanographic Engineering, (1993)

== Career and notable achievements ==
Wijffels is a senior scientist at the Woods Hole Oceanographic Institution in the Physical Oceanography department. Prior to joining WHOI, she worked at CSIRO.

Wijffels, in collaboration with colleagues at NASA, identified and corrected systematic biases, discovered in 70% of measurements in the Global Ocean Observing System. This led to the observation that the world's oceans have both warmed and risen at an increased rate in the past four decades.

Wijffels has received the Australian Meteorological and Oceanographic Society's Priestly Medal and the Australian Academy of Science's Dorothy Hill award in recognition of her efforts to understand the role of the oceans in climate change.

In 2011 Wijffels was inducted to the Tasmanian Honour Roll of Women for service to science.
