= RAFOS float =

Submersible device used to map ocean currents well below the surface

RAFOS floats are submersible devices used to map ocean currents well below the surface. They drift with these deep currents and listen for acoustic "pongs" emitted at designated times from multiple moored sound sources. By analyzing the time required for each pong to reach a float, researchers can pinpoint its position by trilateration. The floats are able to detect the pongs at ranges of hundreds of kilometers because they generally target a range of depths known as the SOFAR (Sound Fixing And Ranging) channel, which acts as a waveguide for sound. The name "RAFOS" derives from the earlier SOFAR floats, which emitted sounds that moored receivers picked up, allowing real-time underwater tracking. When the transmit and receive roles were reversed, so was the name: RAFOS is SOFAR spelled backward. Listening for sound requires far less energy than transmitting it, so RAFOS floats are cheaper and longer lasting than their predecessors, but they do not provide information in real-time: instead they store it on board, and upon completing their mission, drop a weight, rise to the surface, and transmit the data to shore by satellite.

== Introduction ==
=== Of the importance of measuring ocean currents ===
The underwater world is still mostly unknown. The main reason for it is the difficulty to gather information in situ, to experiment, and even to reach certain places. But the ocean nonetheless is of crucial importance for scientists, as it covers about 71% of the planet.

Knowledge of ocean currents is of crucial importance. In important scientific aspects, as the study of global warming, ocean currents are found to greatly affect the Earth's climate since they are the main heat transfer mechanism. They are the reason for heat flux between hot and cold regions, and in a larger sense drive almost every understood circulation. These currents also affect marine debris, and vice versa. In an economical aspect, a better understanding can help reducing costs of shipping, since the currents would help boats reduce fuel costs. In the sail-ship era knowledge was even more essential. Even today, the round-the-world sailing competitors employ surface currents to their benefit. Ocean currents are also very important in the dispersal of many life forms. An example is the life-cycle of the European Eel.

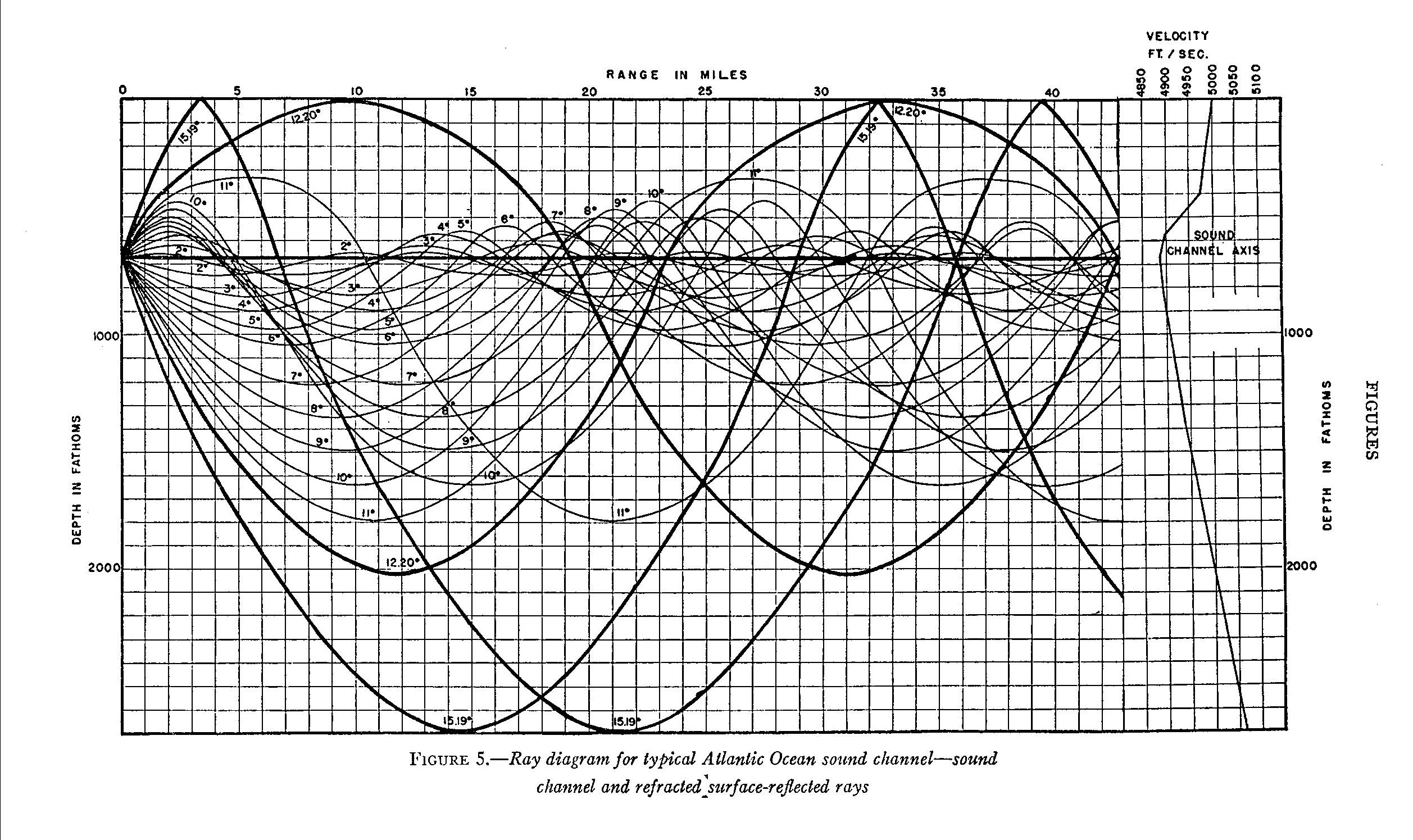
Sound wave propagation in the SOFAR channel and speed of sound in function of depth

=== The SOFAR channel ===
The SOFAR channel (short for Sound Fixing and Ranging channel), or deep sound channel (DSC), is a horizontal layer of water in the ocean at which depth the speed of sound is minimal, in average around 1200 m deep. It acts as a wave-guide for sound, and low frequency sound waves within the channel may travel thousands of miles before dissipating.

The SOFAR channel is centred on the depth where the cumulative effect of temperature and water pressure (and, to a smaller extent, salinity) combine to create the region of minimum sound speed in the water column. Near the surface, the rapidly falling temperature causes a decrease in sound speed, or a negative sound speed gradient. With increasing depth, the increasing pressure causes an increase in sound speed, or a positive sound speed gradient.

The depth where the sound speed is at a minimum is the sound channel axis. This is a characteristic that can be found in optical guides. If a sound wave propagates away from this horizontal channel, the part of the wave furthest from the channel axis travels faster, so the wave turns back toward the channel axis. As a result, the sound waves trace a path that oscillates across the SOFAR channel axis. This principle is similar to long distance transmission of light in an optical fiber. In this channel, a sound has a range of over 2000 km.

== RAFOS float ==
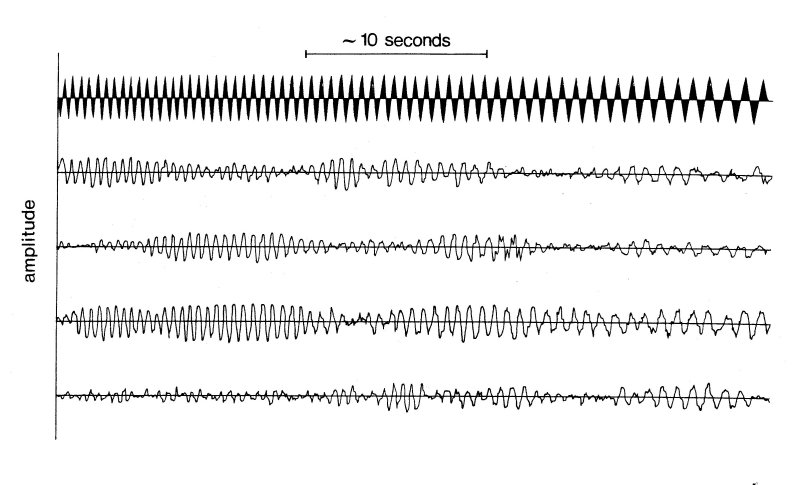
Sound wave correlation

=== Global idea ===
To use a RAFOS float, one has to submerge it in the specified location, so that it will get carried by the current. Then, every so often (usually every 6 or 8 hours) an 80-second sound signal is sent from moored emitters. Using the fact that a signal transmitted in the ocean preserves its phase structure (or pattern) for several minutes, it has been thought to use signals in which the frequency increases linearly of 1.523 Hz from start to end centered around 250 Hz. Then receivers would listen for specific phase structures, by comparing the incoming data with a reference 80-second signal. This permits to get rid of any noise appearing during the travel of the wave by floating particles or fish.

The detection scheme can be simplified by keeping only the information of positive or negative signal, allowing to work with a single bit of new information at each time step. This method works very well, and allows the use of small micro-processors, enabling the float itself to do the listening and computing, and a moored sound source. From the arrival time of the signals from two or more sound sources, and the previous location of the float, its current location can easily be determined to considerable (<1 km) accuracy. For instance, the float will listen for three sources and store the time of arrival for the two largest signals heard from each source. The location of the float will be computed onshore.

=== Technical characteristics ===
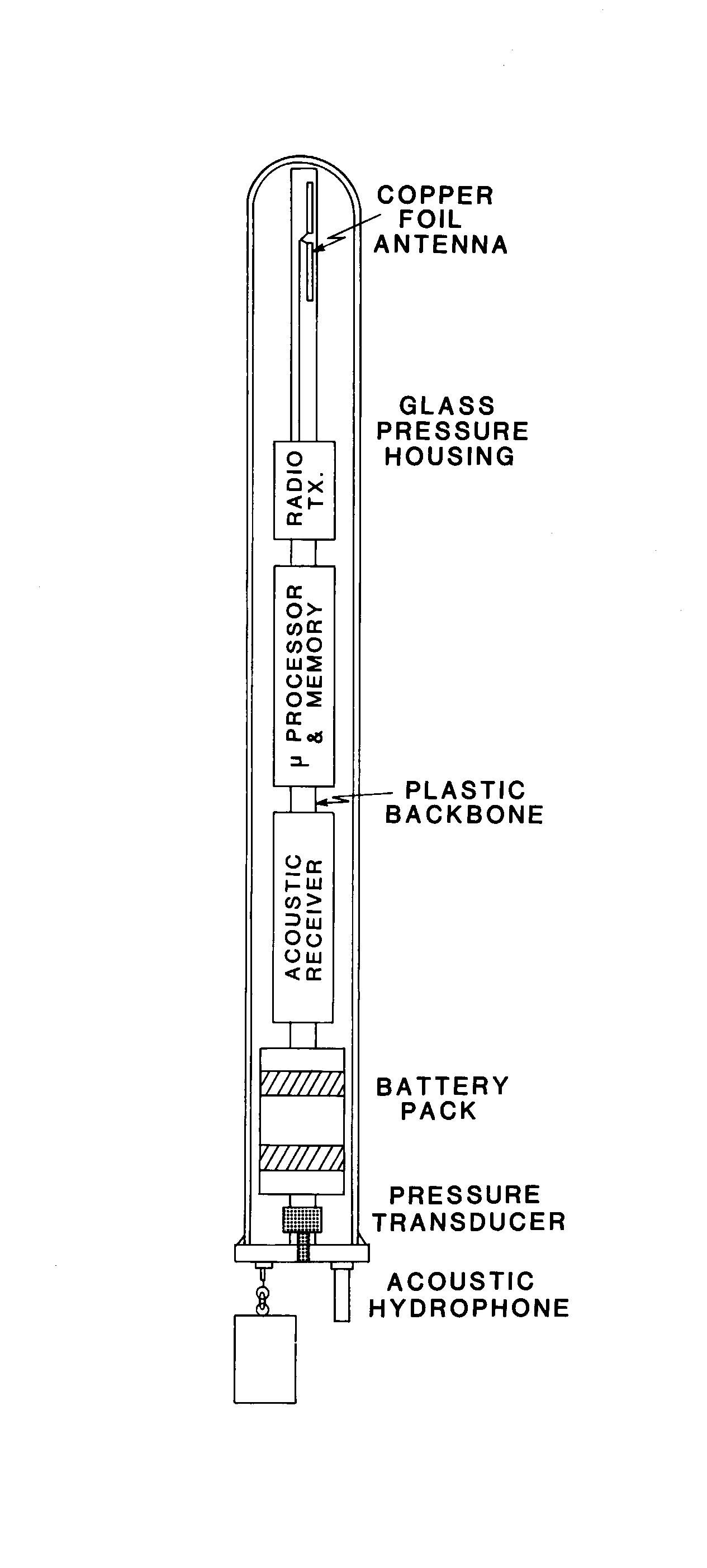
The interior of a basic RAFOS float

==== Mechanical characteristics ====
The floats consist of 8 cm by 1.5 to 2.2 m long glass pipe that contain a hydrophone, signal processing circuits, a microprocessor, a clock and a battery. A float weighs about 10 kg. The lower end is sealed with a flat aluminium endplate where all electrical and mechanical penetrators are located. The glass thickness is about 5 mm, giving the float a theoretical maximum depth of about 2700 m. The external ballast is suspended by a short piece of wire chosen for its resistance to saltwater corrosion. By dissolving it electrolytically the 1 kg ballast is released and the float returns to the surface.

==== Electrical characteristics ====
The electronics can be divided into four categories: a satellite transmitter used after surfacing, the set of sensors, a time reference clock, and a microprocessor. The clock is essential in locating the float, since it is used as reference to calculate the time travel of the sound signals from the moored emitters. It is also useful to have the float work on schedule. The microprocessor controls all subsystems except the clock, and stores the collected data at a regular schedule. The satellite transmitter is used to send data packages to orbiting satellites after the surfacing. It usually takes three days for the satellite to collect all the dataset.

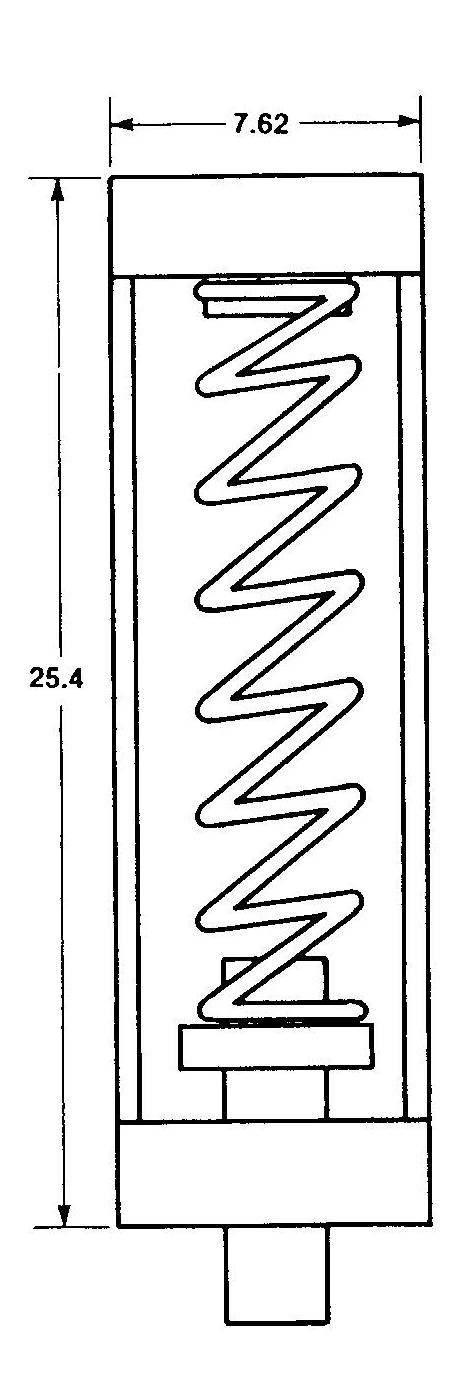
An isopycnal ballast spring

==== The isobaric model ====
An isobaric float aims to follow a constant pressure plane, by adjusting the ballast's weight to attain buoyancy to a certain depth. It is the most easily achieved model. To achieve an isobaric float, its compressibility must be much lower than that of seawater. In that case, if the float were to be moved upwards from equilibrium, it will expand less than the surrounding seawater, leading to a restoring force pushing it downwards, back to its equilibrium position. Once correctly balanced, the float will remain in a constant pressure field.

==== The isopycnal model ====
The aim of an isopycnal float is to follow the density planes, that is to attain neutral buoyancy for constant density. To achieve this, it is necessary to remove pressure induced restoring forces, thus the float has to have the same compressibility as the surrounding seawater. This is often achieved by a compressible element, as a piston in a cylinder, so that the CPU can change the volume according to changes in pressure. An error of about 10% in the setting can lead to a 50 m depth difference once in water. This is why floats are ballasted in tanks working at high pressure.

== Measures and projects ==
=== Computing the float's trajectory ===
Once the float's mission is over and the data collected by the satellites, one major step is to compute the float's route over time. This is done by looking at the travel time of the signals from the moored speakers to the float, computed from the emission time (known accurately), the reception time (known from the float's clock and corrected if the clock had moved). Then, because the speed of sound is known to 0.3% in sea, the position of the float can be determined to about 1 km by an iterative circular tracking procedure. The doppler effect can also be taken into account. Since the float's speed is not known, a first closing speed is determined by measuring the shift in time arrival between two transmissions, where the float is considered not to have moved.

=== The Argo project ===
The Argo project is an international collaboration between 50 research and operational agencies from 26 countries that aims to measure a global array of temperature, salinity and pressure of the top 2000m of the ocean. It uses over 3000 floats, some of which use RAFOS for underwater geolocation; most simply use the Global Positioning System (GPS) to obtain a position when surfacing every 10 days. This project has greatly contributed to the scientific community and has issued many data that has since been used for ocean parameters cartography and Global change analysis.

=== Other results ===
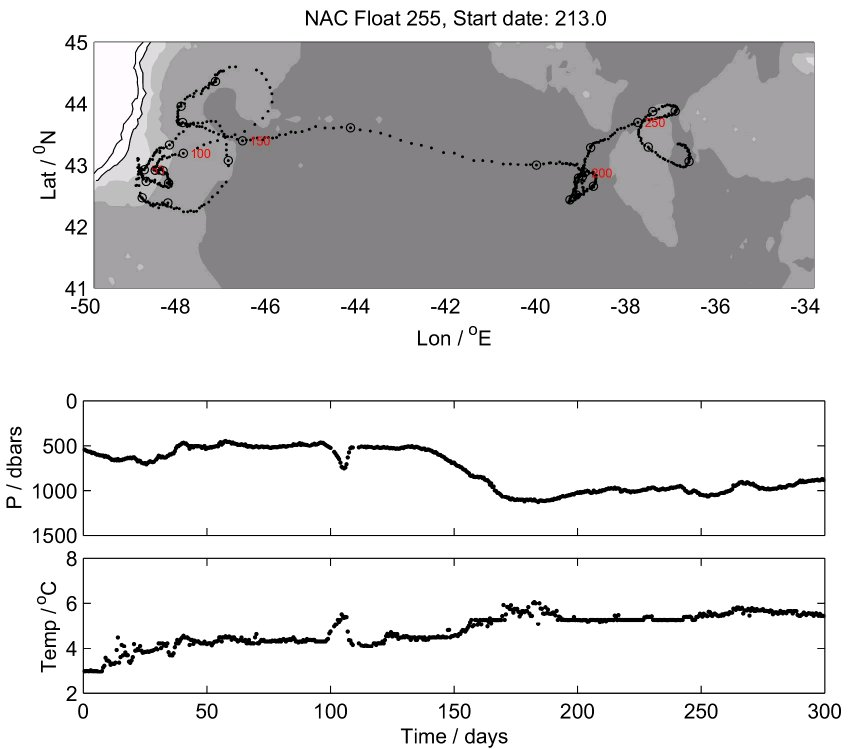
A float trajectory and the corresponding data.

Many results have been achieved thanks to these floats, on the global mapping of the ocean characteristics, or for example how floats systematically shoal (upwell) as they approach anticyclonic meanders and deepen (downwell) as they approach cyclonic meanders. On the left is a typical set of data from a RAFOS float. Today, such floats remain the best way to systematically probe the ocean's interior, since it is automatic and self-sufficient. In recent developments the floats have been able to measure different amounts of dissolved gases, and even to carry small experiments in situ.

== See also ==
- Argo (oceanography)
- SOFAR channel
- Ocean acoustic tomography
