= Journal of Marine Research =

- Discipline: Biology
- Language: English
- Edited by: Kenneth H. Brink

Publication details
- History: 1937–present
- Publisher: Yale University
- Frequency: Bimonthly

Standard abbreviations
- ISO 4: J. Mar. Res.

Indexing
- ISSN: 0022-2402 (print); 1543-9542 (web)

Links
- Journal homepage

The Journal of Marine Research is an American journal, first published by Yale University in 1937, that covers peer-reviewed scientific articles and is still published today. The academic journal publishes articles that deal with biological processes, as well as those that report significant observations. A supplement, The Sea is occasionally published.
