= Henry Stommel =

American oceanographer

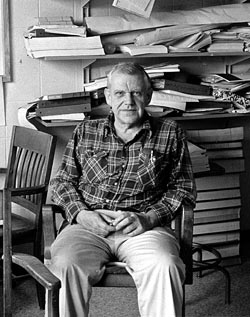
- Henry Stommel
- Born: September 27, 1920; Wilmington, Delaware
- Died: January 17, 1992 (aged 71)
- Education: Yale University
- Known for: ocean circulation Gulf Stream
- Awards: ForMemRS; Bigelow Medal (1974); Maurice Ewing Medal (1977); Alexander Agassiz Medal (1979); William Bowie Medal (1982); Crafoord Prize (1983); National Medal of Science (1989)
- Scientific career
- Fields: physical oceanography
- Workplaces: Yale University; MIT

Henry Melson Stommel (September 27, 1920 – January 17, 1992) was a major contributor to the field of physical oceanography. Beginning in the 1940s, he advanced theories about global ocean circulation patterns and the behavior of the Gulf Stream that form the basis of physical oceanography today. Widely recognized as one of the most influential and productive oceanographers of his time, Stommel was both a groundbreaking theoretician and an astute, seagoing observer.

== Early life and education ==
Stommel was born in Wilmington, Delaware. An anomaly among modern scientists, Stommel became a full professor without an earned doctorate. He received his B.S. in astronomy from Yale University (1942) and served there as instructor in mathematics and astronomy (1942–44).

== Academic posts ==
He was research associate at the Woods Hole Oceanographic Institution from 1944 to 1959 where the Office of Naval Research supported his projects. He became professor of oceanography at Harvard University in 1959 and moved to Massachusetts Institute of Technology in 1963, where he remained until 1978, returning to Woods Hole until his retirement. Stommel established the PANULIRUS station (begun in 1954) in Bermuda. PANULIRUS was the name of a wooden, round bilged research vessel (thus R/V Panulirus) operated by the Bermuda Biological Station for Research for many years. On a monthly schedule, the vessel obtained sea water samples at vertical intervals from the surface to great depths, which yielded temperature, salinity and some additional chemical data. Because the sea bottom falls away very sharply, particularly to the East-south-east of Bermuda, it is possible to obtain a representative sampling within a few miles of land. The resulting data set constitutes the longest such data series of similar character in the North Atlantic Ocean.

Stommel was elected to the National Academy of Sciences in 1962 and received the National Medal of Science in 1989.

== Discoveries ==
Henry Stommel showed that the north-south gradient of the strength of the horizontal Coriolis force (the "beta effect") was responsible for the observed fact that the return flow of the slow interior gyre circulations is concentrated in fast moving western boundary currents, such as the Gulf Stream and the Kuroshio Current, a process known as western intensification. As a result, these western boundary currents have a larger and steadier transport than the corresponding boundary currents, such as the California Current and Canary Current, on the eastern side of the ocean basins. In subtropical latitudes, the western boundary currents are important in transporting the excess heat the earth receives in the tropics towards the poles.

Together with Arnold Arons, Stommel extended this circulation to the deep ocean, proposing a global circulation in which surface water sinks in the polar regions to feed the deep boundary currents on the western sides of basins, while the interior flow actually moves towards the pole. This work, based on laboratory studies, predated the discovery of such boundary currents, and remains one of the great triumphs of theoretical physical oceanography. Stommel also developed early models of the thermohaline circulation which suggested that it might have more than one stable state.

In addition to his work on large-scale ocean currents, Stommel did research on a variety of problems in oceanography and meteorology. These include work on the classification of estuaries, estimates of turbulent diffusion, and studies of the impact of volcanoes on climate. He, with his wife Elizabeth, were the first to popularly link the 1815 eruption of Mount Tambora with the 1816 Year Without a Summer.

== Marriage ==
Stommel married Elizabeth Brown, daughter of Huntington Brown, professor of English at the University of Minnesota, and Elizabeth Waldo Wentworth Brown, originally of Boston, on December 6, 1950. They had three children.

== Bibliography ==
- Science of the Seven Seas, Cornell Maritime Press, 1945.
- The Gulf Stream; A Physical and Dynamical Description, Second Edition, University of California Press, 1972. ISBN 0-520-01223-2
- Volcano weather : the story of 1816, the year without a summer, Seven Seas Press, 1983
- Lost Islands: The Story of Islands That Have Vanished from Nautical Charts, University of British Columbia Press, 146 pages, 1984. ISBN 0-7748-0210-3 Dover reprint, 2017
- "A view of the sea: A Discussion between a Chief Engineer and an Oceanographer about the Machinery of the Ocean Circulation", Princeton University Press, 184 pages, 1987. ISBN 0-691-08458-0. This book has been translated into Chinese (Simplified) by Shanghai Scientific & Technological Education Publishing House, 2001. ISBN 7-5428-2738-3
- An Introduction to the Coriolis Force (with Dennis W. Moore), Columbia University Press, 297 pages, 1989. ISBN 0-231-06637-6

== Sources ==
- Biographical Memoirs: Henry Stommel, by Carl Wunsch, The National Academies Press, 1987.
