= Harald Sverdrup (oceanographer) =

Norwegian oceanographer (1888–1957)

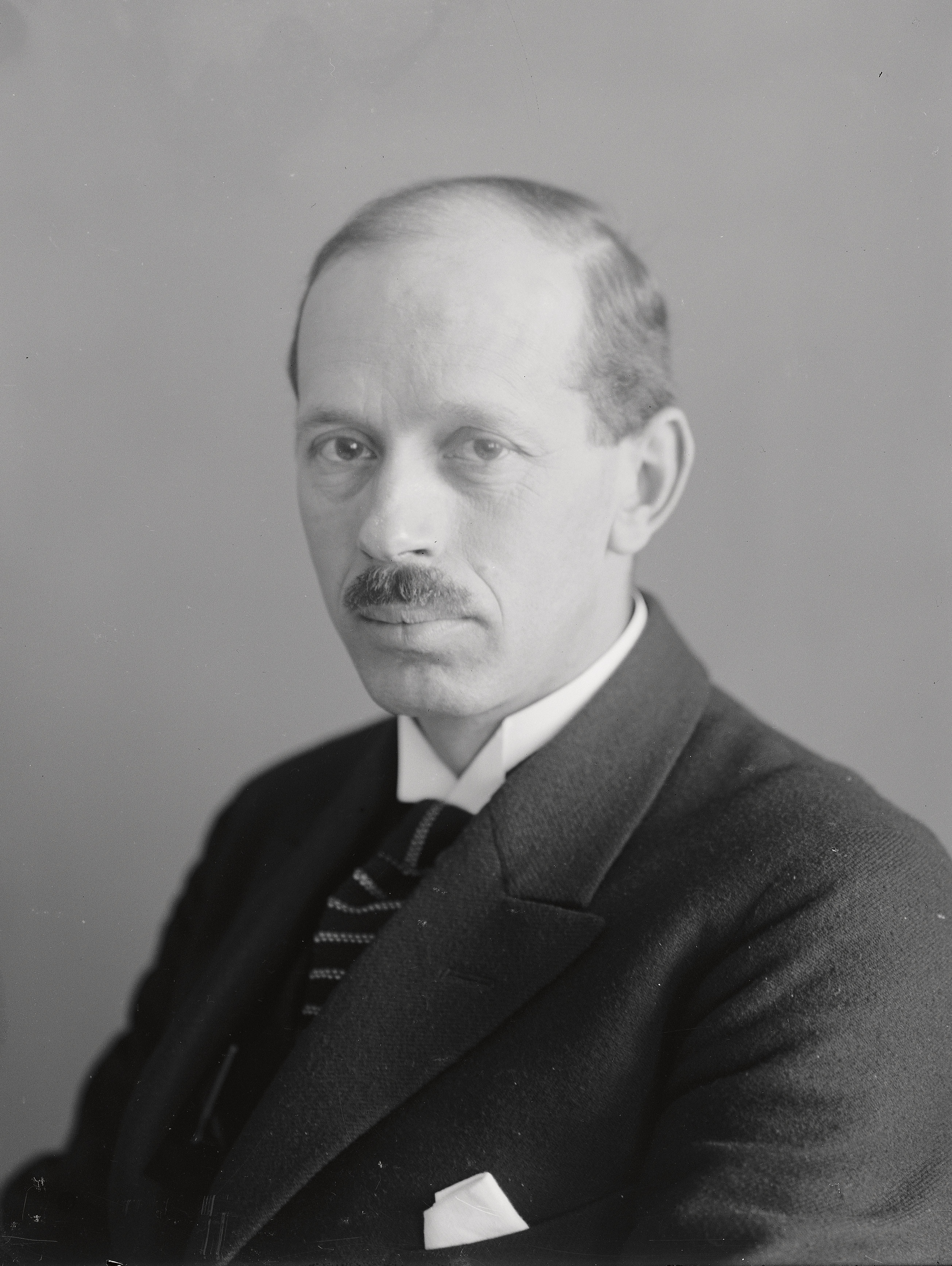
- Born: 15 November 1888; Sogndal, Nordre Bergenhus, Norway
- Died: 21 August 1957 (aged 68); Oslo, Norway
- Education: University of Oslo; University of Leipzig
- Known for: Geophysical fluid dynamics Ocean dynamics Physical oceanography Sverdrup balance Sverdrup wave Sverdrup’s Critical Depth Hypothesis; Sverdrup (unit)
- Awards: Vega Medal (1930); Alexander Agassiz Medal (1938); Patron's Medal (1950); William Bowie Medal (1951)
- Scientific career
- Fields: Oceanography, meteorology
- Workplaces: Geophysical Institute, University of Bergen; Scripps Institution of Oceanography; Norwegian Polar Institute
- Doctoral advisor: Vilhelm Bjerknes
- Doctoral students: Walter Munk

Harald Ulrik Sverdrup (15 November 1888 – 21 August 1957) was a Norwegian oceanographer and meteorologist. He served as director of the Scripps Institution of Oceanography and the Norwegian Polar Institute.

== Background ==
He was born at Sogndal Municipality in Nordre Bergenhus, Norway. He was the son of Lutheran theologian Edvard Sverdrup (1861–1923) and Maria Vollan (1865–1891). His sister Mimi Sverdrup Lunden (1894–1955) was an educator and author. His brother Leif Sverdrup (1898–1976) was a General with the U.S. Army Corps of Engineers. His brother Einar Sverdrup (1895–1942) was CEO of Store Norske Spitsbergen Kulkompani.

Sverdrup was a student at Bergen Cathedral School in 1901 before graduating in 1906 at Kongsgård School in Stavanger. He graduated cand. real. in 1914 from University of Oslo. He studied under Vilhelm Bjerknes and earned his Dr. Philos. at the University of Leipzig in 1917.

== Career ==
He was the scientific director of the North Polar expedition of Roald Amundsen aboard the Maud from 1918 to 1925. His measurements of bottom depths, tidal currents, and tidal elevations on the vast shelf areas off the East Siberian Sea correctly described the propagation of tides as Poincare waves. Upon his return from this long expedition exploring the shelf seas to the north of Siberia, he became the chair in meteorology at the University of Bergen.

He was made director of California's Scripps Institution of Oceanography in 1936, initially for three years but the intervention of World War II meant he held the post until 1948. During 33 expeditions with the research vessel E. W. Scripps between 1938 and 1941, he produced a detailed oceanographic dataset off the coast of California. He also developed a simple theory of the general ocean circulation postulating a dynamical vorticity balance between the wind-stress curl and the meridional gradient of the Coriolis parameter, the Sverdrup balance. This balance describes wind-driven ocean gyres away from continental margins at western boundaries.

After leaving Scripps, he became director of the Norwegian Polar Institute in Oslo and continued to contribute to oceanography, ocean biology, and polar research. In biological oceanography, his critical depth hypothesis (published in 1953) was a significant milestone in the explanation of spring blooms of phytoplankton.

Sverdrup was a member of both the United States National Academy of Sciences, the Norwegian Academies of Science, the American Academy of Arts and Sciences, and the American Philosophical Society. He served as President of the International Association of Physical Oceanography and of the International Council for the Exploration of the Sea (ICES). His many publications include his magnum opus The Oceans: Their Physics, Chemistry and General Biology by Sverdrup, Martin W. Johnson and Richard H. Fleming (1942, new edition 1970) which formed the basic curriculum of oceanography for the next 40 years around the world.

== Personal life ==
In 1928, he married Gudrun (Vaumund) Bronn (1893–1983) and adopted her daughter Anna Margrethe.

== Honors ==
He was awarded the William Bowie Medal by the American Geophysical Union, the Alexander Agassiz Medal of the National Academy of Sciences, the Patron's Medal of the Royal Geographical Society, the Vega Medal by the Swedish Society for Anthropology and Geography and the Swedish Order of the Polar Star.

== Legacy ==
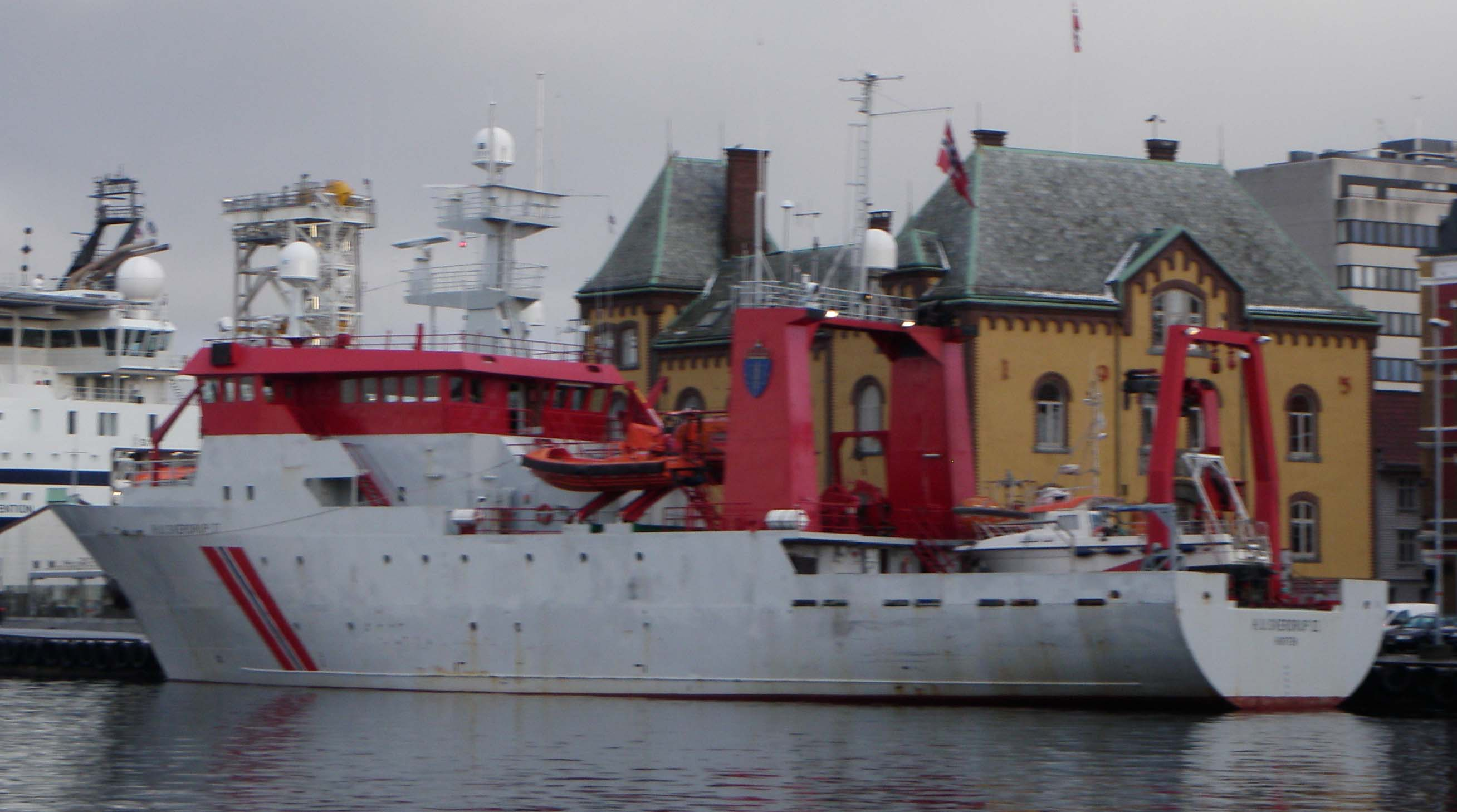
MS H.U. Sverdrup II research vessel

The Sverdrup, a unit describing the volume of water transport in ocean currents, is named after Harald Sverdrup. 1 Sverdrup is a volume flux of one million cubic meters per second (1 Sv = 10^{6} m^{3} per second).

The Sverdrup Gold Medal Award was named in his honor by the American Meteorological Society.

The Norwegian research vessel MS H.U. Sverdrup II is named in his honor.

In 1977, the UK-APC named a series of peaks in Palmer Land, Antarctica the Sverdrup Nunataks after him.

== Sources ==
- Wordie, J. M. (November 1957). "Prof. H. U. Sverdrup". Nature. 180 (4594): 1023. Bibcode:1957Natur.180.1023W. doi:10.1038/1801023a0. S2CID 4153268.
- Spjeldnaes, Nils (1976). "Harald Ulrik Sverdrup". Dictionary of Scientific Biography. Vol. 13. New York: Scribner's. pp. 166–167.
- Sager, Gunther (September 1957). "In Memoriam Prof. Dr. Harald Ulrik Sverdrup". Zeitschrift für Meteorologie. 11 (9): 257–259.
- Revelle, Roger; Munk, Walter (1948). "Harald Ulrik Sverdrup – An Appreciation" (PDF). Journal of Marine Research. 7 (3): 127–131. Archived (PDF) from the original on 2021-05-17.
- Nierenberg, William A. (1996). "Harald Ulrik Sverdrup, 1888–1957" (PDF). Biographical Memoirs. Vol. 69. National Academy of Sciences. pp. 337–375. ISBN 978-0-309-05346-4.
- Oreskes, Naomi; Rainger, Ronald (September 2000). "Science and Security before the Atomic Bomb: The Loyalty Case of Harald U. Sverdrup". Studies in History and Philosophy of Science Part B: Studies in History and Philosophy of Modern Physics. 31 (3): 309–369. Bibcode:2000SHPMP..31..309O. doi:10.1016/S1355-2198(00)00019-8.

Preceded by T. Wayland Vaughan	Director of Scripps Institution of Oceanography; 1936–1948	Succeeded by Carl Eckart
