= Lisa Goddard =

American climatologist (1966–2022)

- Born: Lisa Marie Goddard; September 23, 1966; Sacramento, California
- Died: January 13, 2022 (aged 55); Mount Kisco, New York, U.S.
- Education: University of California, Berkeley (BA); Princeton University (PhD)
- Spouse: David Cooperberg
- Scientific career
- Fields: Climate scientist
- Institutions: International Research Institute for Climate and Society; Columbia University
- Thesis: The energetics of interannual variability in the tropical Pacific Ocean (1995)
- Doctoral advisor: S. George Philander

Lisa Marie Goddard (September 23, 1966 – January 13, 2022) was an American climate scientist who was director at the International Research Institute for Climate and Society (IRI). She joined the institute in 1995 and served as IRI's director from 2012 to 2020. Goddard was also an adjunct associate professor at Columbia University.

Her research focused on forecasting methodology, seasonal climate forecasting and verification, climate change projections and especially on the interpretation of climate models and available observations. She was involved in activities of the World Climate Research Programme and acted as co-chair in CLIVAR from 2013 to 2015.

== Biography ==
Lisa Goddard graduated from the University of California, Berkeley, with a degree in physics in 1988. She received a PhD in atmospheric and oceanic sciences at Princeton University in 1995 under George Philander. She joined IRI as a postdoctoral fellow immediately following her PhD, and spent her entire career there, eventually rising to the Director of the IRI, which position she held from 2012 to 2020.

She began her career at a time when the importance of the El Niño–Southern Oscillation to seasonal weather patterns was just beginning to be understood. The focus of her research would become weather forecasting on seasonal to decadal scales. She sought to provide people with near-term information about weather hazards such as droughts, heat-waves, floods. During the course of her career she collaborated with governments and non-profits in dozens of countries to provide useful short-term forecasts for agriculture, public health, emergency planning and energy production.

Goddard held a number of influential positions during her career. From 2009 to 2017, she was a member of the U.S. National Academy of Sciences Board of Atmospheric Science and Climate. She co-chaired World Climate Research Programme's CLIVAR project from 2013 to 2015.

She married David Cooperberg and had two sons, Matthew and Samuel.

== Death ==
Goddard died from breast cancer in Mount Kisco, New York, on January 13, 2022, at the age of 55, after her courageous five year battle. She has been laid to rest in Kensico Cemetery in Valhalla, NY.

== Selected publications ==
During her career, she contributed to more than 100 research articles. Many of her most prominent works were related to the use of weather models to forecast on seasonal to decadal scales, including:

- Gerald A Meehl; Lisa Goddard; James Murphy; Ronald J Stouffer; George Boer; et al. (October 2009). "Decadal prediction: Can it be skillful?". Bulletin of the American Meteorological Society. 90 (10): 1467–1486. doi:10.1175/2009BAMS2778.1. hdl:11343/32785.
- Lisa Goddard; Simon J Mason; Stephen E Zebiak; Chester F Ropelewski; Reid Basher; Mark A Cane (August 2001). "Current approaches to seasonal to interannual climate predictions". International Journal of Climatology. 21 (9): 1111–1152. Bibcode:2001IJCli..21.1111G. doi:10.1002/joc.636. S2CID 129691453.
- Gerald A Meehl; Lisa Goddard; George Boer; Robert Burgman; Grant Branstator; et al. (February 2014). "Decadal climate prediction: an update from the trenches". Bulletin of the American Meteorological Society. 95 (2): 243. Bibcode:2014BAMS...95..243M. doi:10.1175/BAMS-D-12-00241.1. hdl:11858/00-001M-0000-000F-E747-9. S2CID 20657966.
- Lisa Goddard; A Kumar; A Solomon; D Smith; G Boer; et al. (August 2012). "A verification framework for interannual-to-decadal predictions experiments" (PDF). Climate Dynamics. 40 (1–2): 245–272. doi:10.1007/s00382-012-1481-2. S2CID 10125014.
