= Sverdrup Gold Medal =

American Meteorological Society award

Sverdrup Gold Medal Award – is the American Meteorological Society's award granted to researchers who make outstanding contributions to the scientific knowledge of interactions between the oceans and the atmosphere.

== Recipients ==
Source: American Meteorological Society (Select name of award and click "submit")

- 1964 Henry Stommel for his outstanding contributions to the dynamics of ocean currents, especially the Gulf Stream, and for the rich insight with which he has advanced knowledge of the physical nature of oceanic and atmospheric phenomena, ranging from the large-scale circulation of the oceans to cumulus clouds.
- 1966 Walter H. Munk for his outstanding contributions to the dynamics of wind-driven ocean circulations and wave phenomena on the surface of the sea.
- 1970 Kirk Bryan for his outstanding contributions to the numerical solutions of the general circulation of the oceans based on nonlinear, three-dimensional models of the oceans driven by wind stress and differential heating.
- 1971 Klaus Hasselmann for his work on turbulence and his application of weak-coupling theory to a host of geophysical wave phenomena.
- 1972 Vladimir Kamenkovich for his extension of the Sverdrup transport equation to a general theory of ocean circulation, including the effects of island and coastal boundaries, linear and nonlinear.
- 1975 Owen M. Phillips for his outstanding studies of both wave phenomena and turbulence in the upper ocean, and in particular for his contributions to the theory of ocean-wave generation.
- 1976 Robert W. Stewart for outstanding leadership in experimental and theoretical research in problems of the air–sea interface, and the adjacent turbulent boundary layers of the atmosphere and ocean. He has brought the high standards of measurement and analysis of the laboratory to field studies and has pioneered measurements of surface waves and turbulence in the upper ocean.
- 1977 Raymond B. Montgomery for his important contributions to air–sea interactions, isentropic analysis, the study of spatial and temporal analysis of sea level, and the equatorial current system. His influence on a whole generation of oceanographers and meteorologists has been profound—through his encouragement, his high standards of scholarship, and as one of the first editors of the Journal of Meteorology/Journal of the Atmospheric Sciences.
- 1978 John C. Swallow for his pioneering measurements of low-frequency variability in the oceans and for his development of a new class of oceanographic instruments.
- 1979? Hákon Mosby for his studies of bottom water formation in the Arctic and Antarctic seas and of the earth's water balance, and for his inspiring leadership in international cooperation among oceanographers.
- 1981 Jerome Namias for studies of the ocean's role in climatic variability. His long-term dedication to large-scale, air–sea interaction and inspiring leadership has laid the basis for present progress.
- 1983 Michael S. Longuet-Higgins for his many outstanding contributions to our understanding of the dynamics of ocean surface waves, including wave–current interactions, nonlinear interactions among waves, wave instabilities, and wave breaking.
- 1985 S. George Philander for many outstanding contributions to the understanding of the air–sea interaction, particularly in numerous papers describing, discussing, and explaining the Southern Oscillation–El Niño problem, including suggested new physical processes which go far to explaining the observations.
- 1987 James J. O Brien for his outstanding leadership in research on air–sea interactions, the influence of oceanic oscillations on climate variability and of intense storms on oceanic structure.
- 1988 Hisashi Mitsuyasu for pioneering experimental work on ocean-wave dynamics and its applications to wave modeling and forecasting.
- 1991 Klaus Wyrtki for pioneering studies of large-scale oceanographic variability, especially his revealing analyses of Pacific data.
- 1992 Mark A. Cane for the insight provided in his many theoretical studies of large-scale air–sea interaction.
- 1993 Tim P. Barnett for outstanding contributions to research on the role of the oceans in global climate variation.
- 1994 Mark A. Donelan for numerous contributions to the understanding of the physics of ocean surface waves.
- 1995 James F. Price for important interpretations of observations of upper ocean time dependent variability, including Ekman layers, inertial observations, response to a hurricane, oceanic eddies, and mixed layer physics.
- 1996 Julian P. McCreary, Jr. for fundamental contributions to the physical understanding of upper-ocean dynamics including El Niño, the Equatorial Undercurrent, the ocean mixed layer, and eastern boundary currents.
- 1997 Kristina B. Katsaros for pioneering research, leadership during field experiments, and dedication to international education of air–sea interaction.
- 1998 Willard J. Pierson for his contributions to air–sea interaction, particularly aspects of remote sensing.
- 1999 John Stuart Godfrey for contributions to the estimation of air–sea fluxes in the tropics, and to the theory of ocean circulation.
- 2000 Mojib Latif for his many contributions to the theory of largescale ocean–atmosphere interactions, especially his pioneering work with comprehensive coupled models.
- 2001 Stefan Hastenrath for numerous insightful and fundamental contributions to the description and diagnosis of large-scale ocean–atmosphere interactions.
- 2002 Michael L. Banner for advancing the understanding of wave dynamics, especially wave breaking and the role of waves in air–sea interaction.
- 2003 Robert A. Weller, senior scientist, Woods Hole Oceanographic Institution, Woods Hole, Massachusetts for scientific leadership and sustained excellence in the development and use of innovative measurement techniques in the air–sea boundary layer.
- 2004 Prof. Toshio Yamagata, Dept. of Earth & Planetary Science Graduate School of Science, University of Tokyo, Japan for outstanding accomplishments in the study of ocean and climate dynamics, especially with respect to El Niño and air-sea interaction over the Indian Ocean.
- 2005 Joseph Pedlosky, Senior Scientist and Doherty Oceanographer, Woods Hole Oceanographic Institution, Woods Hole, Massachusetts. for developing geophysical fluid dynamics, including the theories of baroclinic instability and of ocean circulation driven by wind and buoyancy flux.
- 2006 Peter K. Taylor, Head, James Rennell Division, National Oceanography Centre, Southampton, United Kingdom For major contributions to our understanding of oceanatmosphere interactions and for determination and leadership in improving the climatology of airsea fluxes based on measurements from ships.
- 2007 David K. Anderson For his extensive contributions to improving the predictability and prediction of climate variability and to better understanding the dynamics of the ocean and of ENSO.
- 2008 Dean Roemmich For major contributions to the measurement and understanding of the ocean’s role in climate, and for leading the development and implementation of the Argo profiling float array.
- 2009 Christopher W. Fairall For important, continuing contributions to air-sea interaction research, particularly the observation and modeling of physical and gaseous transfers in conditions ranging from calm to storms, tropical to arctic.
- 2010 Bruce A. Warren, Woods Hole Oceanographic Inst., Woods Hole, MA For advancing our understanding of the general circulation of the ocean through observations and dynamical interpretation.
- 2011 Eric A. D’Asaro For pioneering instrumental, observational, and analytical progress in understanding upper ocean responses to atmospheric forcing.
- 2012 Allan J. Clarke For fundamental contributions to the dynamics of ocean currents and air-sea interaction with particular emphasis on El Niño/Southern Oscillation.
- 2013 Ken Melville for pioneering contributions in advancing knowledge on the role of surface wave breaking and related processes in air-sea interaction.
- 2014 John Marshall for his fundamental insights into water mass transformation and deep convection and their implications for global climate and its variability
- 2015 Claude Frankignoul for profound contributions to the understanding of the atmosphere’s stochastic forcing of the ocean and the ocean’s feedback
- 2016 Michael McPhaden for fundamental and extensive contributions to understanding, observing, and forecasting tropical oceanic and atmospheric climate variability.
- 2017 Shang-Ping Xie For fundamental contributions to understanding the coupled ocean-atmosphere feedback processes involved in climate variability and climate change
- 2018 Michael Alexander For innovative and insightful studies of large-scale air-sea interactions and their role in climate variability, and interdisciplinary work on climate change impacts on marine ecosystems
- 2019 Fei-Fei Jin For seminal and lasting contributions to understanding ocean–atmosphere interactions in the tropics and mid-latitudes
- 2020 Peter R. Gent For fundamental contributions to understanding the ocean’s role in climate and its representation in Earth system models
- 2021 Sarah T. Gille For seminal work on ocean circulation and air-sea interaction in the Southern Ocean and their impact on the cryosphere, ocean ecosystems, and Earth’s climate
- 2022 Shuyi Chen For fundamental contributions to understanding of tropical air-sea interactions through innovative use of observations and coupled atmosphere-wave-ocean modeling
- 2023 Gerald Meehl For seminal work integrating observations, models, and theory to understand variability and change in the ocean and atmosphere
- 2025 Wenju Cai For exceptional and sustained contributions to understanding of ocean and atmosphere interactions in climate responses to global warming

== See also ==
- List of oceanography awards
- List of meteorology awards
