= The Oceans (textbook) =

Oceanographic textbook by Sverdrup, Johnson, and Fleming

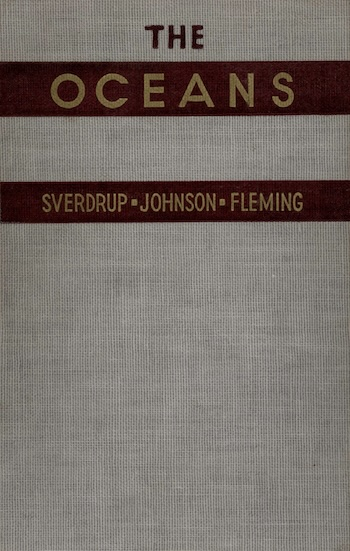
- Front cover of first edition
- Author: Harald Sverdrup, Martin Johnson, Richard Fleming
- Language: English
- Subject: Oceanography
- Genre: Non-fiction
- Publisher: Prentice-Hall, Inc.
- Publication date: 1942, 1970
- Publication place: United States
- Pages: v + 1087

The Oceans: Their Physics, Chemistry and General Biology is an oceanographic textbook by Harald Sverdrup, Martin Johnson, and Richard Fleming. Originally written in 1942, it is commonly referred to as the first oceanographic textbook and fundamental to the history of the science.

Chapters of the text outline and synthesize the sub-domains of oceanography: Biological, chemical, physical, and geological oceanography.

== Table of contents ==
- Preface
- I. Introduction
- II. The Earth and the Ocean Basins
- III. Physical Properties of Sea Water
- IV: General Distribution of Temperature, Salinity, and Density
- V. Theory of Distribution of Variables in the Sea
- VI. Chemistry of Sea Water
- VII. Organisms and the Composition of Sea Water
- VIII. The Sea as a Biological Environment
- IX. Populations of the Sea
- X. Observations and Collections at Sea
- XI. General Character of Ocean Currents
- XII. Statics and Kinematics
- XIII. Dynamics of Ocean Currents
- XIV. Waves and Tides
- XV. The Water Masses and Currents of the Oceans
- XVI. Phytoplankton in Relation to Physical-Chemical Properties of the Environment
- XVII. Animals in Relation to Physical-Chemical Properties of the Environment
- XVIII. Interrelations of Marine Organisms
- XIX. Organic Production in the Sea
- XX. Marine Sedimentation
- Appendix
- Index

== Reception ==
The text was considered of such military importance during World War II that its distribution outside of the United States was forbidden until the war had ended.

In 1945, George Deacon wrote that, the authors had "answered the demand for an up-to-date manual of oceanography."
