= MS H.U. Sverdrup II =

Norwegian research vessel

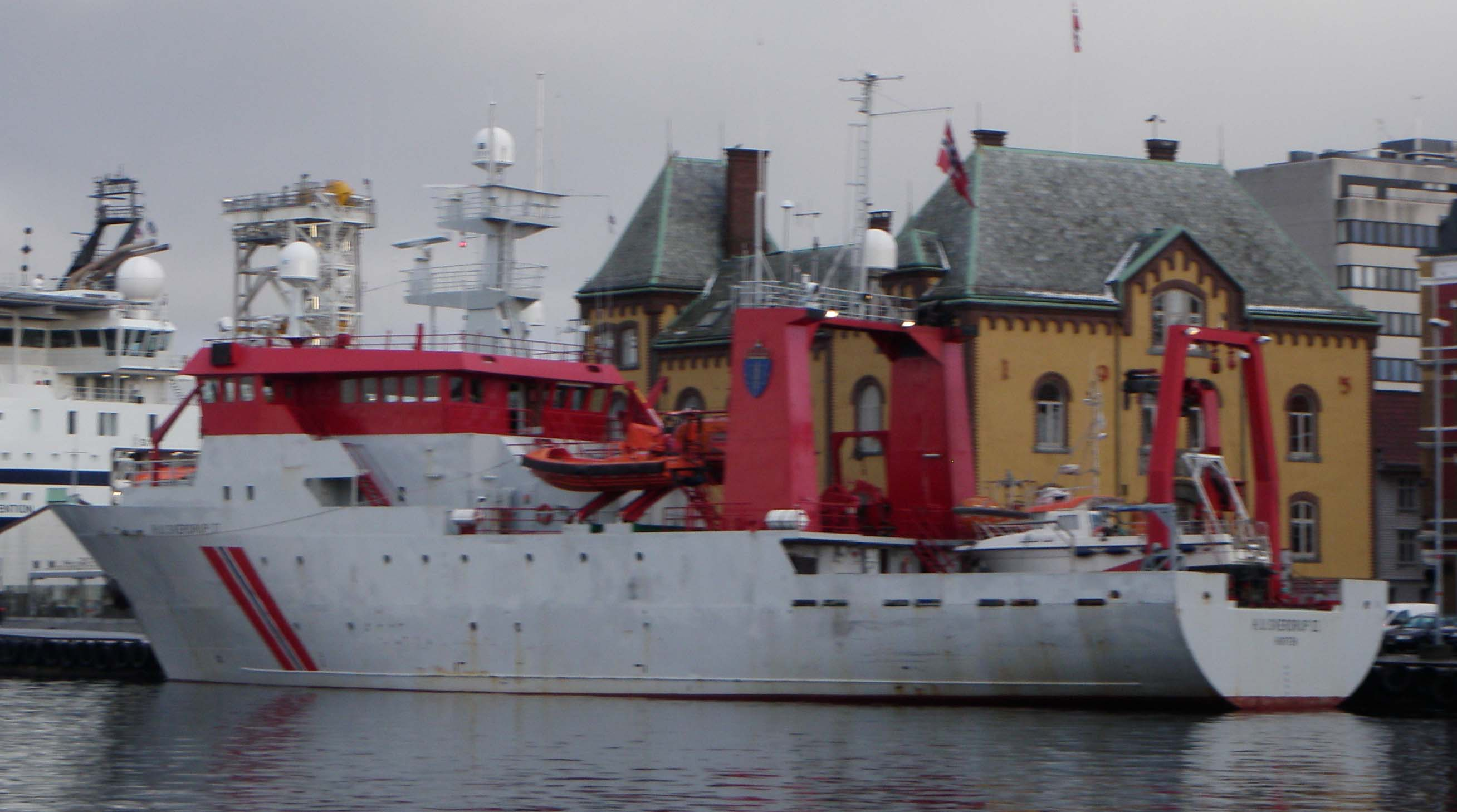
- H.U. Sverdrup II in Stavanger, in January 2012.

History

Norway
- Name: H.U. Sverdrup II
- Namesake: Harald Sverdrup
- Owner: Norwegian Defence Research Establishment
- Laid down: October 25, 1989
- Launched: December 20, 1989
- Completed: July 1, 1990
- Home port: Horten, Norway
- Identification: IMO number: 8921925; MMSI number: 257113000; Callsign: LCMO
- Status: Active

General characteristics
- Tonnage: 1,387 GT
- Length: 55 m (180 ft 5 in)
- Beam: 13 m (42 ft 8 in)
- Height: 7.8 m (25 ft 7 in)
- Draft: 5.5 m (18 ft 1 in)
- Propulsion: Rolls-Royce
- Crew: 7 crew + 15 scientists

MS H.U. Sverdrup II is a Norwegian research vessel owned by the Norwegian Defence Research Establishment. The ship is named after the Norwegian oceanographer and meteorologist Harald Ulrik Sverdrup (1888–1957).

The ship was built in 1990 by Simek AS. It is certified for European trips and is used almost year-round. The ship has space for 15 researchers that can use 151 m^{2} (1,630 sq ft) of lab space and 200 m^{2} (2,200 sq ft) of aft deck space. To reduce noise from the main engine, it is mounted elastically and a passive stabilization system dampens the vessel's rolling movements in bad weather conditions.

== Construction ==
The ship was built under construction number 73 at the Simek shipyard, Sigbjørn Iversen, in Flekkefjord. The hull was supplied by the Kaldnes Industri shipyard in Tønsberg. The keel was laid on October 25, 1989 and the launch took place on December 20, 1989. The ship was completed and delivered on June 1, 1990. It is managed by Remøy Shipping in Fosnavåg.

== Technical data and equipment ==
The ship is powered by a four-stroke, eight-cylinder diesel engine from Bergen Engines (type: 8KR). The motor is mounted elastically to minimize noise. It acts on a variable-pitch propeller via a reduction gear. A shaft generator driven by the drive motor and a generator driven by a Cummins diesel engine (type: QSK38-DM) are available to generate electricity. An emergency generator was also installed. The ship is equipped with an electrically powered bow thruster.

The deck superstructure is located in the front area of the ship. At the rear of the ship there is a 200 square metres (2,200 sq ft) working deck. Five 20-foot and two 10-foot containers can be carried on deck. The ship also has a cargo hold that is accessible via a 3-by-2-meter (9.8 ft × 6.6 ft) hatch on the aft deck. The cargo hold can be serviced by a hydraulically operated crane installed on the starboard side. This can lift 3 tons. The crane can also be used to move loads on the aft deck. The ship is also equipped with a stern gallows that can lift 10 tons. On the starboard side there is a folding boom as an additional lifting tool. This can lift 5 t and has direct access to the wet laboratory via a hatch.

The ship is equipped with a stabilizer. The ship's hull is ice reinforced (Ice Class C).

The ship is operated by a crew of seven. There is also space for 15 scientists. There are eight single and seven double cabins available on board.

== Operations ==
The main purpose of the vessel is military oceanography, but it has spare capacity to take on many civilian expeditions.
