= Alexander Agassiz Medal =

Medal awarded by the U.S. National Academy of Sciences

The Alexander Agassiz Medal is awarded every three years by the U.S. National Academy of Sciences for an original contribution in the science of oceanography. It was established in 1911 by Sir John Murray in honor of his friend, the scientist Alexander Agassiz.

== Recipients ==
Source: National Academy of Sciences

- Johan Hjort (1913)
- Albert I, Prince of Monaco (1918)

For his original contributions to the science of oceanography.

- Charles D. Sigsbee (1920)
- Otto S. Pettersson (1924)

For his studies on the chemistry and physics of the sea.

- Wilhelm Bjerknes (1926)

For his outstanding contributions to dynamic oceanography.

- Max Weber (1927)

For his distinguished research in the field of oceanography.

- Vagn W. Ekman (1928)

For his work in physical oceanography.

- J. Stanley Gardiner (1929)

For his contributions to oceanography.

- Johannes Schmidt (1930)

For his conduct of numerous oceanographic expeditions, his investigations of the life of eels, and the investigations of numerous problems connected with fishes, among which may be mentioned his work on fish genetics and geographic variation.

- Henry B. Bigelow (1931)
- Albert Defant (1932)

For his studies on atmospheric and oceanic circulation and his notable contributions to theoretical oceanography.

- Bjørn Helland-Hansen (1933)

For his studies in physical oceanography and especially for his contributions to knowledge of the dynamic circulation of the ocean.

- Haakon H. Gran (1934)

For his contributions to knowledge of the factors controlling organic production in the sea.

- T. Wayland Vaughan (1935)

For his investigations of corals, foraminifer, and submarine deposits, and for his leadership in developing oceanographic activities on the Pacific coast of America.

- Martin Knudsen (1936)
- Edgar J. Allen (1937)
- Harald U. Sverdrup (1938)
- Frank R. Lillie (1939)
- Columbus Iselin II (1942)

For his studies of the Gulf stream system, for his leadership in the development of a general program of the physical oceanography of the North Atlantic, and for his distinctive direction of the Woods Hole Oceanographic Institution both in times of peace and war.

- Joseph Proudman (1946)

For his distinguished studies of the tides of the world.

- Felix A. Vening Meinesz (1947)

For his contributions to oceanography, particularly by his invention of an apparatus for the determination of gravity at sea, by making many measurements of gravity over each of the great oceans, and by the utilization of these observations in interpreting the physical properties and behavior of the Earth's crust.

- Thomas G. Thompson (1948)

For his leadership in investigations of the complex chemistry of the ocean, with special attention to the waters of the north-east Pacific, Puget Sound, and San Juan Archipelago, and the Bering and Chukchi Seas.

- Harry A. Marmer (1951)

For his distinguished contributions in tidal surveys. His projects have made available to oceanographers accurate, long-period records for large areas where previously very little observational data were available. The program and work which he has originated ultimately will produce reliable conclusions on present-day tectonic processes and the rate of change in the quantity of water in the ocean.

- H. W. Harvey (1952)
- Maurice Ewing (1954)
- Alfred C. Redfield (1955)
- Martin W. Johnson (1959)

For his outstanding leadership in biological and general oceanography. Among Dr. Johnson's contributions are explanations for two newly discovered acoustic phenomena in the sea. These explanations brought biologist and physicists together in a common interest, and introduced underwater acoustics as a prime tool for marine ecology.

- Anton F. Bruun (1960)

For his leadership in the study of the biology of the deep ocean.

- George E. R. Deacon (1962)

For his investigations of the hydrography of the southern ocean.

- Roger R. Revelle (1963)

For his contributions to the understanding of oceanic processes and the geology of the sea floor, and through his research, to the advancement of scientific oceanography throughout the world.

- Sir Edward Bullard (1965)

For his significant investigations of the earth from its surface to its core.

- Carl H. Eckart (1966)

For his significant contributions to physical oceanography.

- Frederick C. Fuglister (1969)

For his stimulating and successful observations of the Gulf Stream and its vortices.

- Seiya Uyeda (1972)

For his contributions to the tectonic and thermal history of the earth and, most notably, the Sea of Japan.

- John H. Steele (1973)
- Walter H. Munk (1976)

For his outstanding experimental and theoretical research on the spectrum of motion in the oceans and the earth.

- Henry M. Stommel (1979)

For his work at sea, in the laboratory, and by analyses through which he made major advances in understanding of ocean circulation and distribution of water masses.

- Wallace S. Broecker (1986)

For his work on chemical exchange among the oceans, atmosphere, and solid Earth, making great contributions to understanding the role of the oceans in the Earth's carbon cycle and its climate.

- Cesare Emiliani (1989)

For masterful achievements using isotopic palaeotemperatures to establish the climatic history of the Pleistocene and for suggesting their relation to the Milankovitch orbital cycles.

- Joseph L. Reid (1992)

For his exploration and observation of the circulation of the world ocean, assembly of its many interacting parts with a lifetime of care, dedication, and insight.

- Victor V. Vacquier (1995)

For his discovery of the flux-gate magnetometer, and for the marine magnetic anomaly surveys that led to the acceptance of the theory of sea-floor spreading.

- Walter C. Pitman, III (1998)

For his fundamental contribution to the plate tectonic revolution through insightful analysis of marine magnetic anomalies and for his studies of the causes and effects of sea-level changes.

- Charles Shipley Cox (2001)

For his pioneering studies, both theoretical and instrumental, of oceanic waves, microstructure and mixing, and of electromagnetic fields in the ocean and in the seafloor.

- Klaus Wyrtki (2004)

For fundamental contributions to the understanding of the oceanic general circulation of abyssal and thermocline waters and for providing the intellectual underpinning for our understanding of ENSO (El Niño).

- James R. Ledwell (2007)

For innovative and insightful tracer experiments using sulfur hexafluoride to understand vertical diffusivity and turbulent mixing in the open ocean.

- Sallie W. Chisholm (2010)

For pioneering studies of the dominant photosynthetic organisms in the sea and for integrating her results into a new understanding of the global ocean.

- David Karl (2013)

For leadership in establishing multi-disciplinary ocean-observing systems, for detection of decadal regime shifts in pelagic ecosystems, and for paradigm-shifting insights on biogeochemical cycles in the ocean.

- Dean Roemmich (2018)

For his ground-breaking contributions to research on the circulation and climate variability in the oceans, for research on the global heat and salt budgets of the oceans and for his leadership in the creation of the global ocean climate observatory, Argo.

- Kirk Bryan Jr (2023)

For his work in the 1960s as the founder of numerical ocean modeling, a breakthrough for climate science and weather forecasting.

== Notes ==
The information in the table is according to the Alexander Agassiz Medal web page at the official website of the National Academy of Sciences unless otherwise specified by additional citations.

== See also ==
- List of oceanography awards
- List of prizes named after people
