= Dean Roemmich =

American oceanographer

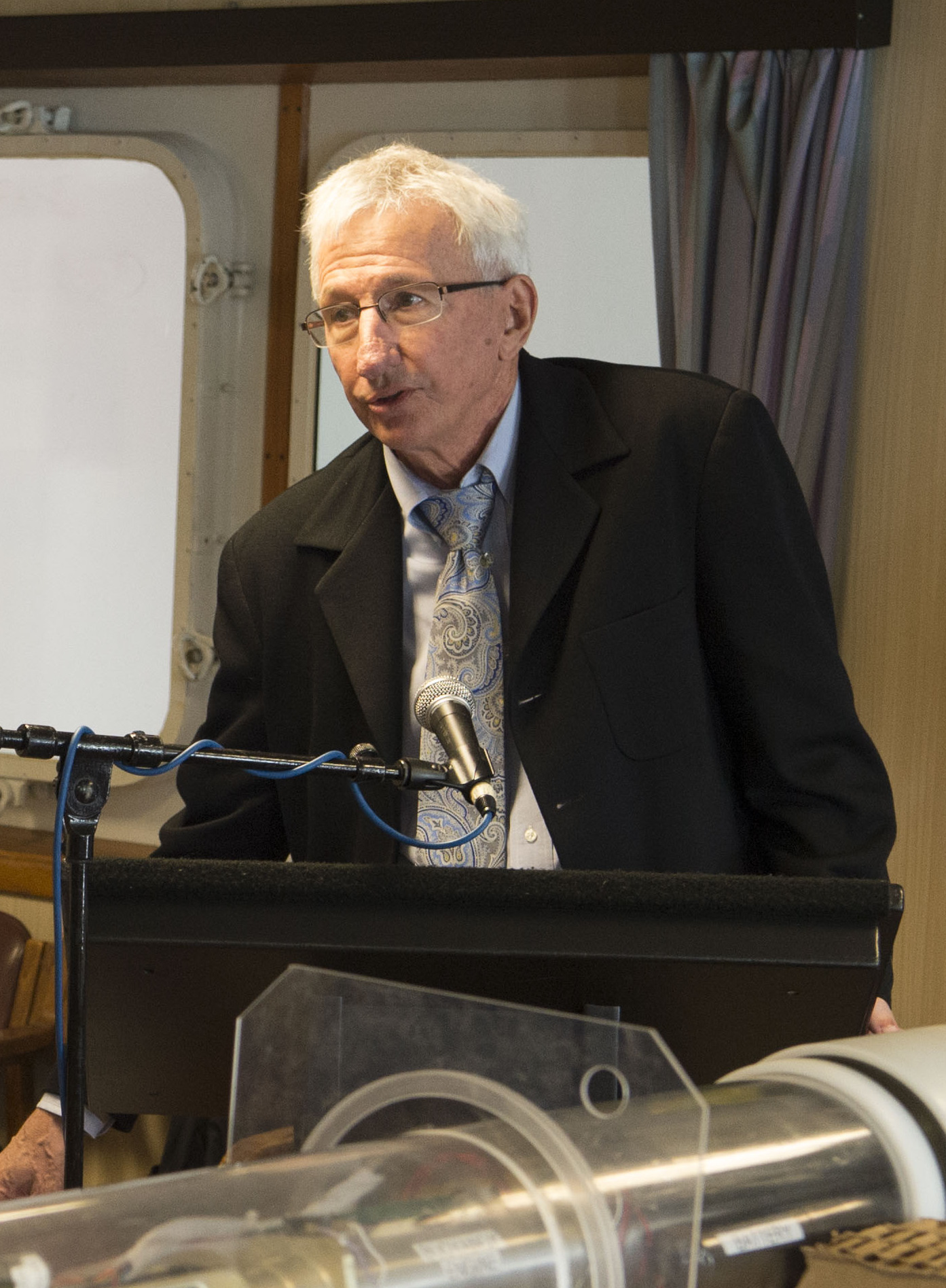
Roemmich in 2017, speaking on the RV Tangaroa in New Zealand

Dean Roemmich (/ˈrɛmɪk/ REM-ik) is a contemporary American physical oceanographer.

Roemmich was the early leader behind the sensors array Argo which continuously and globally measures vertical profiles of oceanic conditions, chiefly temperature and salinity.

He received the Sverdrup Gold Medal Award from the American Meteorological Society in 2008 for "his contributions to the measurement and understanding of the ocean's role in climate, and for leading the development and implementation of the Argo array". He joined Scripps Institution of Oceanography in 1981.

He received the 2018 Alexander Agassiz Medal from the National Academy of Sciences.
