= John Steele (oceanographer) =

British oceanographer

John Hyslop Steele FRS FRSE
- Born: November 15, 1926; Edinburgh
- Died: November 4, 2013 (aged 86); Falmouth, MA
- Citizenship: United Kingdom
- Education: UCL B.Sc. (1946), D.Sc. (1963)
- Scientific career
- Fields: Oceanography
- Institutions: Woods Hole

John Hyslop Steele FRS FRSE (15 November 1926 – 4 November 2013) was a British oceanographer who made major contributions to the study of marine ecosystems.

== Work ==
In 1951 Steele began work at the Marine Laboratory in Aberdeen, Scotland. He was appointed director of the Woods Hole Oceanographic Institution in 1977. After his retirement from Woods Hole in 1989, Steele continued his interests of research and served on the boards of the Bermuda Institute of Ocean Sciences, the Exxon Corporation, and the Robert Wood Johnson Foundation.

== Awards ==
- 1963: Fellow of the Royal Society of Edinburgh.
- 1973: Alexander Agassiz Medal of the National Academy of Sciences.
- 1978: Fellow of the Royal Society.
- 1978: Fellow of the American Academy of Arts and Sciences.

== Life ==
Steele was born 15 November 1926, in Edinburgh. He was educated at George Watson's College, and graduated from University College London in 1946. In 1956 he married Evelyn and they had one son.

Steele died 4 November 2013, at his home in Falmouth, Massachusetts.
