= Cirricaecula =

Scientific classification
- Domain: Eukaryota
- Kingdom: Animalia
- Phylum: Chordata
- Class: Actinopterygii
- Order: Anguilliformes
- Family: Ophichthidae
- Subfamily: Ophichthinae
- Genus: Cirricaecula; L. P. Schultz, 1953

Species
- See text.

Genus of fishes

Cirricaecula is a genus of eels in the snake eel family Ophichthidae.

== Species ==
There are currently two recognized species in this genus:

- Cirricaecula johnsoni L. P. Schultz, 1953 (Fringelip snake-eel)
- Cirricaecula macdowelli McCosker & J. E. Randall, 1993
