= Cirricaecula macdowelli =

Conservation status
- Data Deficient (IUCN 3.1)

Scientific classification
- Kingdom: Animalia
- Phylum: Chordata
- Class: Actinopterygii
- Order: Anguilliformes
- Family: Ophichthidae
- Genus: Cirricaecula
- Species: C. macdowelli

Binomial name
- Cirricaecula macdowelli McCosker & J. E. Randall, 1993

Species of fish

Cirricaecula macdowelli is an eel in the family Ophichthidae (worm/snake eels). It was described by John E. McCosker and John Ernest Randall in 1993. It is a subtropical, marine eel which is known from Taiwan, in the northwestern Pacific Ocean. Males can reach a maximum total length of 22.8 centimetres.

== Etymology ==
The fish is named in honor of Michael McDowell, an Australian tour operator, who has taken the describers to remote outposts in search of rare specimens.
