= Shang-Ping Xie =

Chinese-born climatologist and oceanographer (born 1963)

Shang-Ping Xie (Note: Simplified Chinese: 谢尚平; traditional Chinese: 謝尚平; Japanese: しゃ しょうへい) is a Chinese-American climatologist and oceanographer who holds the Roger Revelle Chair at the Scripps Institution of Oceanography. Known best for his research on interaction between the world's oceans and atmosphere and on El Niño–Southern Oscillation, Xie is noted as a Highly Cited Researcher by Clarivate.

== Early life and education ==
Xie was born in Quzhou in 1963. He entered university after the Cultural Revolution had ended, and studied oceanography, though he had never seen the ocean before. His education includes:

- Bachelor of Science, Shandong College of Oceanography (1984)
- Study at Dalian College of Foreign Languages (1984–1985)
- Master of Science and Doctor of Science, Tohoku University (1988 and 1991)

He was a visiting scientist to Princeton University from 1991 to 1993, and a research associate for the University of Washington from 1993 to 1994.

== Career ==
Xie was employed at the University of Hawaiʻi as a professor of meteorology until he joined the Scripps Institution of Oceanography at the University of California, San Diego, in 2012 as the inaugural Roger Revelle Chair, (Note: In full: Roger Revelle Chair in Environmental Science) a title named for researcher Roger Revelle, established with an endowment from the Revelle family. While at Hawaiʻi, he was faculty in the International Pacific Research Center of the School of Ocean and Earth Science and Technology.

In April 2016, as a Scripps professor, Xie returned to the University of Washington as an endowed lecturer—he gave a lecture on El Niño in the Graduate Students' Distinguished Visiting Lecture series.

== Research ==
In 2013, a study co-authored by Xie and published in Nature suggested that the slowdown in global warming was tied to cooling in parts of the Pacific Ocean. Further research into the slowdown was published in 2015, in the journal Nature Climate Change. Xie has also published research on modeling the role of human activity to global warming; a 2015 co-authored paper in Nature Geoscience modeled the evolution of global temperature, creating a new method of tracking anthropogenic global warming. The modelling was reported on again in 2016, when Xie and others modelled human activities' impact on warming. Other papers on climate change have included collaboration with authors affiliated with Duke University and University of Wisconsin–Madison. In 2019, Xie published research with scientists from the Lawrence Berkeley National Laboratory, where they modelled Hadley cells to predict changes in the monsoon season of parts of Asia. In a 2022 article published by the World Economic Forum and The Conversation and co-authored by Xie, the authors claim that tropical cyclones have been increasing in intensity over time.

In 2016, Xie was the organizer of a special issue of Advances in Atmospheric Sciences. (Note: Volume 33, Issue 4 "Unified Perspective of Climate Variability and Change")

Xie has been included as a Highly Cited Researcher by Clarivate in the field of geosciences.

== Awards ==
- Sverdrup Gold Medal, conferred by the American Meteorological Society (2017) (Note: He was also named a fellow of the society.)
- Member of the National Academy of Sciences (2026)
