= Owen Martin Phillips =

American physical oceanographer and geophysicist

Owen M. Phillips
- Born: December 30, 1930; Parramatta, New South Wales, Australia
- Died: October 13, 2010 (aged 79)
- Citizenship: Australian; American
- Education: University of Sydney; Cambridge University
- Known for: Theoretical studies of waves, ocean mixing, and flow in porous media
- Awards: Sverdrup Gold Medal (1974)
- Scientific career
- Fields: Fluid mechanics Oceanography; Geophysics
- Workplaces: Johns Hopkins University; Cambridge University
- Doctoral advisor: George Batchelor

Owen Martin Phillips (December 30, 1930 – October 13, 2010) was a U.S. physical oceanographer and geophysicist who spent most of his career at the Johns Hopkins University.

== Early life ==
Owen Phillips was born at Parramatta, New South Wales, Australia a suburb of Sydney, the son of Richard Keith and Madeline Constance (née Lofts) Phillips. His father fought in the Gallipoli Campaign during World War I. In 1936 the family moved to the country town of Tamworth where most of his primary education occurred.

== Education ==
He entered the University of Sydney in the fall of 1948. He majored in applied mathematics and physics, graduating with first-class honours in 1952 and sharing the John Coutts Prize for general proficiency in science with J. Stewart Turner. He then moved to the famed Cavendish Laboratory at Cambridge University, from which he received his Ph.D.

== Professional work ==
With the exception of a brief stint in the Department of Applied Mathematics and Theoretical Physics at Cambridge, most of Phillips career was spent at the Johns Hopkins University in Baltimore, Maryland. His early career was largely concerned with the physics of the upper ocean, particular regarding ways in which energy was transferred from the wind into the ocean interior. A particularly important paper in this respect was his 1957 work in the Journal of Fluid Mechanics, proposing that ocean surface waves were generated by turbulent eddies in the atmosphere being swept over the surface in such a way that they resonated with surface disturbances. In later work he developed a mathematical theory that built on ideas of resonance for explaining how energy in waves was transferred from short to large scales. He also worked on understanding how this energy was transferred to the ocean mixed layer, thus constraining the amount of stirring within this layer (Kato and Phillips, 1969). He was awarded the 1974 Sverdrup Gold Medal of the American Meteorological Society "for his outstanding studies of both wave phenomena and turbulence in the upper ocean, and in particular for his contributions to the theory of ocean-wave generation."

In addition to primary area of scientific research, Phillips worked to synthesize knowledge within the broader field of geophysics in a number of books. In 1965 he published a monograph on the dynamics of the upper ocean which received the Adams Prize from the Royal Society. Translated into Russian and Chinese, with a second edition appearing in 1977, it was an important textbook in a field which at the time had few such works. He also worked with others in the Johns Hopkins department to study flow in porous media, publishing an important monograph on this subject in 1991.

== Honors and awards ==
- Adams Prize (1964)
- Fellow of the Royal Society (1968)
- Sverdrup Gold Medal Award (1974)
- Fellow of the American Meteorological Society (1980)
- Elected U.S. National Academy of Engineering (1998)
- Fellow of the American Geophysical Union (2006)

== Select publications ==
- Phillips, O.M. (1957). "On the generation of waves by the turbulent wind". Journal of Fluid Mechanics. 2 (5): 417–445. Bibcode:1957JFM.....2..417P. doi:10.1017/s0022112057000233. S2CID 116675962.
- Phillips, O.M. (1960). "On the dynamics of unsteady gravity waves of finite amplitude, Part 1: The elementary interaction". Journal of Fluid Mechanics. 9 (2): 193–217. Bibcode:1960JFM.....9..193P. doi:10.1017/s0022112060001043. S2CID 122928711.
- Kato, H.; Phillips, O.M. (1969). "On the penetration of a turbulent layer into a stratified fluid". J. Fluid Mech. 37 (4): 643–655. Bibcode:1969JFM....37..643K. doi:10.1017/S0022112069000784. S2CID 122260276.
- Phillips, O.M. (1977). The dynamics of the upper ocean (2nd ed.). Cambridge University Press. ISBN 978-0-521-29801-8.
- Phillips, O.M. (1991). Flow and reactions in permeable rocks. Cambridge University Press. ISBN 0-521-38098-7.
- Phillips, O.M. (2009). Geological fluid dynamics – Sub-surface flow and reactions. Cambridge University Press. doi:10.1017/CBO9780511807473. ISBN 978-0-521-86555-5.

== See also ==
- Wind wave
- Mixed layer
