= Martin W. Johnson =

American oceanographer

- Portrait of Johnson in the 1930s
- Born: Martin Wiggo Johnson; September 30, 1893; Chandler, South Dakota
- Died: November 28, 1984 (aged 91); Snohomish, Washington
- Occupation: oceanographer

Martin Wiggo Johnson (September 30, 1893 – November 28, 1984), was an American oceanographer at Scripps Institution of Oceanography. He is known as an author of the landmark reference work The Oceans: Their Physics, Chemistry and General Biology (1942, 1970); for explaining the deep scattering layer (DSL) as a result of what is now called the diel vertical migration; and for studies of zooplankton that revealed that the physics of water movement was an important influence on population biology and community diversity.

== Background ==
Of Scandinavian ancestry, Johnson was born on September 30, 1893, in a sod-roofed farm house on the Great Plains in Chandler, South Dakota. As a young man, he worked on threshing crews in the wheat harvests of Saskatchewan and the Dakotas, and was a general ranch hand. His family moved to Washington state, where he worked as a logger and as a guard on salmon traps.

== Education ==
After army service during World War I, Johnson attended the University of Washington where he received a Bachelor of Science degree in 1923, and an Master of Science degree in 1930. He was later awarded a PhD by the university.

== Career ==
Johnson was the Friday Harbor biological station curator and a scientific assistant at the Passamaquoddy International Fisheries Commission. From 1933 to 1934 he was an Associate at the University of Washington.

In 1934 he was offered a position as a research associate at Scripps Institution of Oceanography, La Jolla, California for $100.00 per month. Given the Great Depression, he was happy to get a salary. From then until 1961, he was a professor of marine biology at Scripps, and then a Professor emeritus at Scripps. He continued working in his laboratory at Scripps until a few months before his death at 91. Johnson died on November 28, 1984, in Snohomish, Washington.

== Research ==
With Harald Sverdrup and Richard H. Fleming, Johnson wrote The Oceans: Their Physics, Chemistry and General Biology, considered a landmark reference work. It was written for an interdisciplinary course in general oceanography at Scripps. Although it was published in 1942, its overseas distribution was forbidden until after World War II.

Johnson proposed an explanation for the deep scattering layer (DSL), a puzzling phenomenon observed by Navy sonar during World War II, in which the depth of the ocean appeared to change. On June 26–27, 1945, Johnson examined depth-stratified net hauls. He confirmed that there were large concentrations of zooplankton at depths that corresponded to the deep scattering layer. His research was published in 1948. The pattern of movement that he documented is now known as the diel vertical migration.

"The deep scattering layer has been shown by its diurnal vertical migrations to be biological in nature. The partial reflection of fathometer signals in this layer promises to be a useful ecological tool in studying the organisms involved". Johnson, 1948

After the war, Johnson helped to establish the California Cooperative Oceanic Fisheries Investigations and the Marine Life Research Group at Scripps. Johnson and the Scripps graduate students studied the California Current and did fundamental research to establish the nature and life histories of zooplankton populations. They observed that the area of the California Current contained an unusual and extensive mixing of species which had larger populations in other areas. This work led to a "heretical" theory, supported by further research, that the physics of water movement was an important factor underlying explanations of population biology and community diversity.

Johnson was a member of the Capricorn Expedition (1952-1953), jointly sponsored by the U.S. Navy and the University of California, which developed a detailed description of the Capricorn Seamount on the eastern flank of the Tonga trench. It was the first Scripps expedition to use scuba divers to explore the Pacific, and also used techniques such as echo sounding, seismic and magnetic data collection, coring and heat flux measurement.

After retiring as a professor emeritus, Johnson studied the larval development of Pacific lobsters and identified differing developmental sequences. He produced illustrations and caricatures.

== Works ==
- Concerning the copepod Eucalanus elongatus Dana and its varieties in the northeast Pacific by Martin Wiggo Johnson (1938)
- Some Observations on the Feeding Habits of the Octopus by Martin W. Johnson in Science (8 May 1942)
- Concerning the proposed word "echolocation" by Martin W. Johnson in Science (23 March 1945)
- The Oceans: Their Physics, Chemistry and General Biology by Harald Sverdrup, Martin W. Johnson and Richard H. Fleming (1942, new edition 1970)
- The Euphausiacea (Crustacea) of the North Pacific by Brian P. Boden, Martin W. Johnson, and Edward Brinton (Bulletin of the Scripps Institution of Oceanography. Volume 6, Number 8, 1955)
- Marine and Fresh Water Plankton by Martin W. Johnson in Ecology (Vol. 37, No. 4, 1956, pp. 859–860)
- Production and distribution of larvae of the spiny lobster, Panulirus interruptus (Randall) with records on P. gracilis Streets by Martin Wiggo Johnson (1960)
- Martin W. Johnson (1960). "The offshore drift of larvae of the California spiny lobster Panulirus interruptus" (PDF). California Co-operative Oceanic Fisheries Investigations. 7: 147–161. Archived from the original (PDF) on 2011-07-20.
- The palinurid and scyllarid lobster larvae of the tropical eastern Pacific, and their distribution as related to the prevailing hydrography by Martin Wiggo Johnson (1971)

== Honours ==
The National Academy of Sciences in 1959 awarded Johnson the Alexander Agassiz Medal, "For his outstanding leadership in biological and general oceanography. Among Dr. Johnson's contributions are explanations for two newly discovered acoustic phenomena in the sea. These explanations brought biologist and physicists together in a common interest, and introduced underwater acoustics as a prime tool for marine ecology".

== Taxon named in his honor ==
The Fringelip snake eel Cirricaecula johnsoni is named in his honor.

== Personal life ==
Johnson was a mandolin player and had a wood carving hobby. In 1983 a scientific paper, Spectral properties of Noctiluca miliaris Suriray, a heterotrophic dinoflagellate, by W.M. Balch and F.T. Haxo, was "...dedicated to Martin W. Johnson on the occasion of his 90th birthday."
