= Cirricaecula johnsoni =

Conservation status
- Least Concern (IUCN 3.1)

Scientific classification
- Kingdom: Animalia
- Phylum: Chordata
- Class: Actinopterygii
- Order: Anguilliformes
- Family: Ophichthidae
- Genus: Cirricaecula
- Species: C. johnsoni

Binomial name
- Cirricaecula johnsoni L. P. Schultz, 1953

Species of fish

Cirricaecula johnsoni, known commonly as the Fringelip snake eel, is an eel in the family Ophichthidae (worm/snake eels). It was described by Leonard Peter Schultz in 1953. It is a tropical, marine eel which is known from the Rongerik Atoll, Marshall Islands, in the western central Pacific Ocean. Males can reach a maximum total length of 40 centimetres.

== Etymology ==
The fish was named in honor of Dr. Martin Johnson, who was at Scripps Institute of Oceanography in La Jolla, California.
