= H. W. Harvey =

English marine biologist (1887–1970)

Hildebrand Harvey
- Born: Hildebrand Wolfe Harvey; 31 December 1887
- Died: 26 November 1970 (aged 82)
- Education: Downing College, Cambridge
- Awards: Fellow of the Royal Society; Alexander Agassiz Medal (1952); CBE
- Scientific career
- Workplaces: University of Cambridge; Marine Biological Association

Hildebrand Wolfe Harvey CBE FRS (born 31 December 1887, Streatham, London, died Plymouth, Devon, 26 November 1970) was an English marine biologist.

== Background ==
Harvey was the elder son of Henry Allington Harvey, a partner in the firm of Foster, Mason and Hervey, of Mitcham, Surrey, paint manufacturers, and his wife, Laetitia, who was a daughter of Peter Kingsley Wolfe and a descendant of General James Wolfe, hero of the Battle of the Plains of Abraham.

== Education ==
After attending Gresham's School, Holt, from 1902 to 1906, he went on to study at Downing College, Cambridge, to read Natural Sciences.

== War service ==
During World War I Harvey served in the Royal Naval Volunteer Reserve. He navigated minesweepers and patrol vessels.

== Career ==
In 1921 he joined the Marine Biological Association in Plymouth as a hydrographical assistant. His early work was on the oceanography of the western English Channel.

In 1928 he published a monograph on the chemistry and physics of sea water, and in 1933 a classic paper on the rate of diatom growth. With three colleagues he wrote a seminal paper on plankton and its control.

The National Marine Biological Library at the Marine Biological Association retain some of Harvey's scientific notebooks and records, including data sheets and notes on hydrographic observations.

== Publications ==
Harvey's published work includes:

- The Action of Poisons upon Chlamydomonas and other vegetable Cells (1909)
- Note on the Surface Electric Charges of Living Cells (1911)
- On Manganese in Sea and Fresh Waters
- Hydrography of the Mouth of the English Channel (1929–1932)
- Über das Kohlensäuresystem im Meerwasser by Kurt Buch, H. W. Harvey, H. Wattenberg, and S. Gripenberg (Conseil Perm. Internat. p. l'Explor. de la Mer, Rapp. et Proc.-Verb. (v. 79, 1932)
- Note on Colloidal Ferric Hydroxide in Sea Water (1937)
- Note on Selective Feeding by Calanus (1937)
- Recent Advances in the Chemistry and Biology of Sea Water (Cambridge University Press, 1945)
- On the production of living matter in the sea off Plymouth (Journal of the Marine Biological Association, 1950)
- The Chemistry and Fertility of Sea Waters (Cambridge University Press, 1966)

== Honours and awards ==
In 1952 he received the Alexander Agassiz Medal of the United States National Academy of Sciences. In recommending the award, the Murray committee said:

H. W. Harvey has been the leading student for many years of the changes in the chemical constituents of sea water brought about through the agencies of plants and animals and also of how the availability of nutrient chemicals determines the fertility of the sea.

Harvey was also elected a Fellow of the Royal Society in 1942. His candidacy read:

"Distinguished for his fruitful studies concerning the factors which control the production of life in the sea. He has carried out extensive researches on the role of nitrates and other inorganic constituents of sea water both under laboratory and natural conditions. He has also developed highly valuable and original methods for the qualitative estimation of phytoplankton. All this work has added greatly to our knowledge of the general cycles of marine life."

Harvey was also awarded

- Alexander Agassiz Medal, 1952
- Commander of the Order of the British Empire, 1958

== Personal life ==
In 1923 he married Elsie Marguerite Sanders, but they later divorced. In 1933 he married secondly Marjorie Joan Sarjeant, and they had one son.
