= T. Wayland Vaughan =

American geologist and oceanographer

Thomas Wayland Vaughan
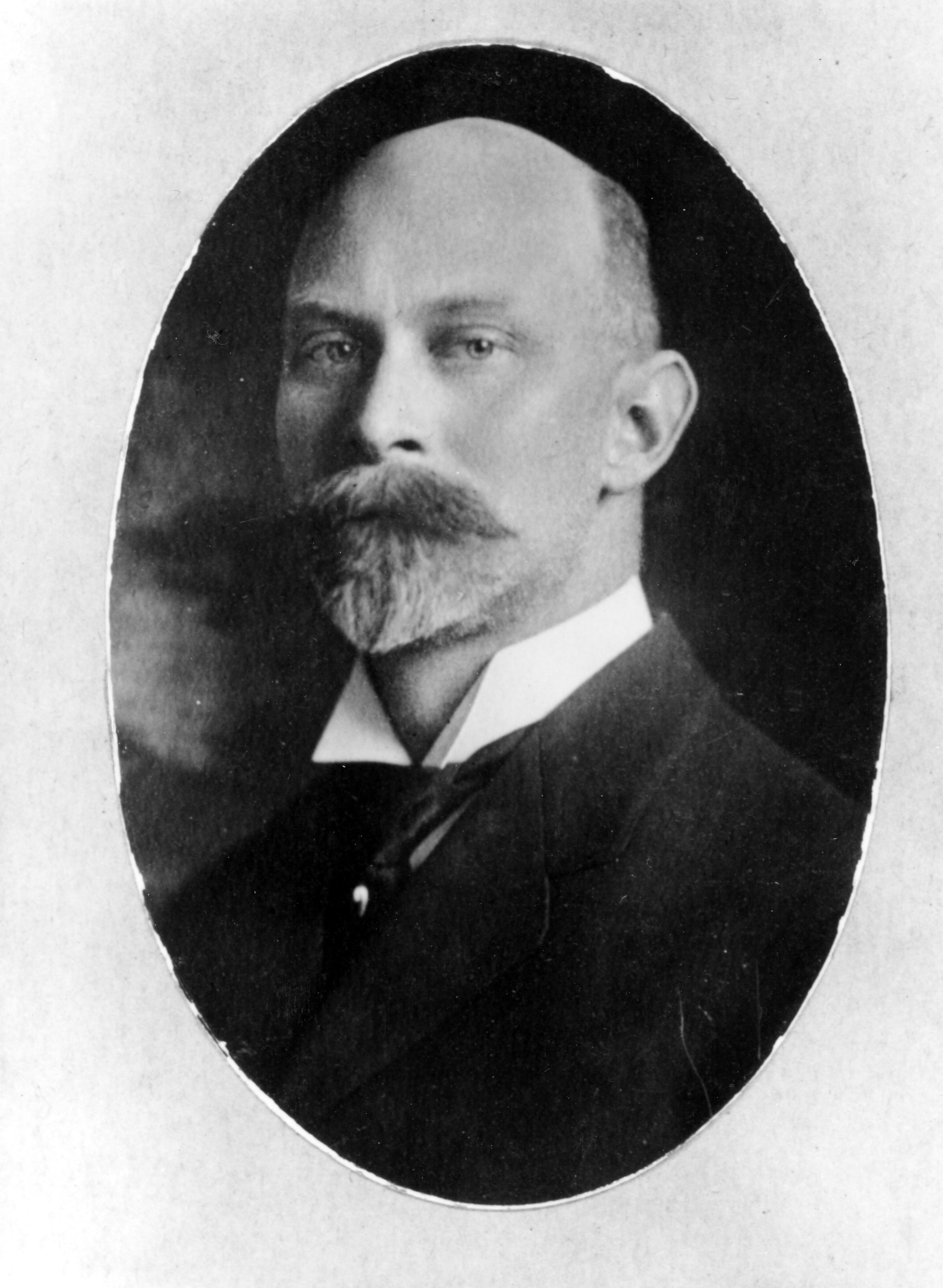
- Undated 1890s portrait of Thomas Wayland Vaughan
- Born: September 20, 1870; Jonesville, Texas, US
- Died: January 16, 1952 (aged 81); Washington, D.C., US
- Resting place: Concord Cemetery, Jonesville, Texas
- Education: Tulane University, Harvard University
- Spouse(s): Dorothy Quincy Upham, 1909–1949
- Awards: Alexander Agassiz Medal (1935); Decorated Order of Rising Sun Third Class, Japan (1940); Mary Clark Thompson Medal (1945); Penrose Medal (1946)
- Scientific career
- Fields: Geology, oceanography
- Workplaces: United States Geological Survey, United States National Museum, Scripps Institution of Oceanography
- Thesis: Eocene and oligocene corals of the United States

Thomas Wayland Vaughan (September 20, 1870 – January 16, 1952) was an American geologist and oceanographer. He worked with the United States Geological Survey and United States National Museum, investigating the geology of the West Indies, Panama Canal Zone, and the eastern coast of North America. In 1924 Vaughan became director of the Scripps Institution of Oceanography and held the post until his retirement in 1936. His research work concentrated on the study of corals and coral reefs, the investigation of larger foraminifera, and oceanography.

== Early life and education ==
Vaughan was one of five children born to Dr. Samuel Floyd Vaughan and Annie R. Hope. He entered Tulane University in 1885 intending to enter the medical profession, but became interested in physical science and graduated with a Bachelor of Science.

From 1889–1892, Vaughan taught physics and chemistry at Mount Lebanon, Louisiana. During this time he published his first papers on the mollusks and trees of northwest Louisiana and began collecting fossils. This led him to study biology at Harvard University, receiving a Bachelor of Arts in 1893, a Master of Arts in 1894, and completing his Ph.D. in 1903 with a thesis titled Eocene and Oligocene Corals of the United States. Before receiving his doctorate, he also worked as an assistant geologist for the United States Geological Survey from 1894 to 1903.

== Career ==
Vaughan participated in a number of geological surveys of the West Indies (1901 and 1914), Panama Canal Zone (1911), the Dominican and Haitian Republics (1919 to 1921), the Virgin Islands and eastern Puerto Rico (1919), and the Atlantic and Gulf Coast Plains (1907–1923).

Earlier in his career Vaughan published many papers and several monographs on corals and coral reefs. He investigated the corals of Florida and the Bahamas from 1908 to 1915 under the auspices of the Department of Marine Biology of the Carnegie Institution of Washington. Later he studied the Larger Foraminifera.

In 1924 Vaughan became the second director of the Scripps Institution for Biological Research, suggested by outgoing director William Emerson Ritter. During Vaughan's tenure, the institution was refocused to concentrate on oceanography and was renamed the Scripps Institution of Oceanography. Vaughan created programs in physical, chemical, and geological oceanography, augmented the biology program, and expanded the Institution's facilities. He retired in 1936 and was replaced by Harald Sverdrup.

Throughout his career he also served on scientific committees under the National Research Council and the National Academy of Sciences. While serving on the Committee on Oceanography for the National Academy of Sciences in the 1930s, Vaughan favored the creation of an east-coast counterpart to the Scripps Institution, and the committee encouraged the Rockefeller Foundation to provide one million dollars to found the Woods Hole Oceanographic Institution. A smaller donation also went to the Oceanographic Laboratories at the University of Washington.

== Later life and legacy ==
Vaughan received a number of awards and honorary degrees, including the Alexander Agassiz Medal and the Penrose Medal. He was elected to the American Academy of Arts and Sciences in 1917, the United States National Academy of Sciences in 1921, and the American Philosophical Society in 1923.

In the 1930s Vaughan developed an interest in Asian art, learning the Japanese language while in his sixties and becoming a lecturer on Asian art. In 1933 he was given a private audience with Emperor Hirohito and presented with a cloisonné vase, and in 1940 was decorated with the Order of the Rising Sun Third Class.

In 1947 Vaughan became partially blind after a severe attack of pneumonia. He kept abreast of research in his fields of interest thanks to assistance from friends and students, who would read scientific literature to him for a few hours each day.

Vaughan died of a stroke on January 16, 1952, while living in Washington D.C.

== Selected publications ==
- Wayland Vaughan, T. (1900). The Eocene and Lower Oligocene Coral Faunas of the United States with Descriptions of a Few Doubtfully Cretaceous Species. Monographs of the United States Geographical Survey, Volume XXXIX.
- Corals and the formation of coral reefs, from the Smithsonian Report, 1917, pp189–276.
- A geological reconnaissance of the Dominican republic, Washington DC, 1921. (With other authors)
- Studies of American species of Foraminifera of the genus Lepidocyclina; Smithsonian Institution, 1933.
- International Aspects of Oceanography: Oceanographic Data and Provisions for Oceanographic Research., Mem. Nat. Acad. Sci. (1937).

Academic offices
Preceded by William Emerson Ritter	Director of Scripps Institution of Oceanography; 1924 – 1936	Succeeded by Carl Eckart
