= Wenju Cai =

Australian astronomer

- Education: Xiamen University (BSc, MSc), Flinders University (PhD)
- Occupations: Oceanographer, climatologist, researcher
- Employer(s): Commonwealth Scientific and Industrial Research Organisation (CSIRO)
- Known for: El Niño and La Niña events, Indian Ocean Dipole, Southern Hemisphere ocean–atmosphere interactions
- Title: Professor, Chief Research Scientist

Wenju Cai (蔡文炬) is a oceanographer, climate scientist and researcher. His contributions to climate science have helped advance understanding of extreme El Niño and La Niña events, the Indian Ocean Dipole, and changes in Southern Hemisphere ocean–atmosphere systems.

== Education ==
Cai received his Bachelor of Science and Master of Science degrees from Amoy University (now Xiamen University) and his Doctor of Philosophy (PhD) from Flinders University in 2000.

== Career ==
Cai started his career at the Commonwealth Scientific and Industrial Research Organisation (CSIRO) in 1990 as an experimental scientist. He subsequently held positions of increasing responsibility, becoming a research scientist in 1994, a senior research scientist in 1997, a principal research scientist in 2003, and a senior principal research scientist in 2007. In 2014 he became a chief research scientist at CSIRO Oceans and Atmosphere.

Throughout his career, Cai has specialised in climate variability and climate change, particularly the El Niño–Southern Oscillation (ENSO), the Indian Ocean Dipole (IOD), and ocean–atmosphere interactions. His research has examined how greenhouse warming, rising carbon dioxide concentrations, anthropogenic aerosols, and stratospheric ozone depletion influence climate systems and extreme climate events.

Cai has also held several international scientific leadership roles. From 2009 to 2015, he co-chaired the World Climate Research Programme's CLIVAR Pacific Panel, coordinating international research into Pacific Ocean circulation and climate. He contributed to the Intergovernmental Panel on Climate Change (IPCC) assessment reports, including the Fourth and Fifth Assessment Reports.

From 2014 to 2016, Cai served as research director of CSIRO's Earth System Assessment Program. In 2017, he became the founding director of the Centre for Southern Hemisphere Oceans Research (CSHOR), a collaborative research initiative involving CSIRO, the Qingdao National Laboratory for Marine Science and Technology, the University of New South Wales, and the University of Tasmania.

In recognition of his scientific achievements, he was elected a Fellow of the Australian Academy of Science in 2020.

== Awards and Achievements ==
- Sverdrup Gold Medal (2025)
- Fellow of the American Geophysical Union (2022)
- Fellow of the Australian Academy of Science (2020)
- Highly Cited Researcher (< 1%) Clarivate Web of Science (2019)
- Ocean Science Distinguished Lecture at the Asian Oceanic Geophysical Society (2019)
- 50th Anniversary Convocation Medal at Flinders University (2016)
- China National Ocean Science and Technology Award by the China State Ocean Administration (2015)
- Green Card Professor award (the highest honour for overseas Chinese scholar) Ocean University of China (2012)
- OCE Science Leader award by CSIRO (2011)
- Look Out!!! CSIRO Strategic Excellence Award (as part of Climate Change Australia Team) by CSIRO (2008)
- Best Science Communicator award by CSIRO (2008)
- Nobel Peace Prize as a contributing author to the IPCC Fourth Assessment Report for which Intergovernmental Panel on Climate Change was awarded the Prize (2007)
