= Critical depth =

Hypothesized depth at which phytoplankton growth is matched by losses

In biological oceanography, critical depth is defined as a hypothetical surface mixing depth where phytoplankton growth is precisely matched by losses of phytoplankton biomass within the depth interval. (Note: "Critical depth" is an important term in ocean acoustics defining the lower limit of the full deep sound channel. That depth lies below the axis of the main duct of sound speed minimum. It is the point at which sound speed equals the maximum found above the axis in the surface layer. See SOFAR channel.) This concept is useful for understanding the initiation of phytoplankton blooms.

== History ==
Critical depth as an aspect of biological oceanography was introduced in 1935 by Gran and Braarud. It became prominent in 1953 when Harald Sverdrup published the "Critical Depth Hypothesis" based on observations he had made in the North Atlantic on the Weather Ship M.

Sverdrup provides a simple formula based on several assumptions that relates the critical depth to plankton growth and loss rates and light levels. Under his hypothesis, net production in the mixed layer exceeds losses only if the mixed layer is shallower than the critical depth. His hypothesis has often been misconstrued to suggest that spring phytoplankton blooms are triggered when the mixed layer depth shoals to become shallower than the critical depth in the spring. In fact, this is not what Sverdrup intended.

Since 1953, further investigation and research has been conducted to better define the critical depth and its role in initiating spring phytoplankton blooms. Recent analysis of satellite data suggest that the theory does not explain all spring blooms, particularly the North Atlantic spring bloom. Several papers have appeared recently that suggest a different relationship between the mixed layer depth and spring bloom timing.

== Definition ==
Sverdrup defines the critical depth at which integrated photosynthesis equals integrated respiration. This can also be described as the depth at which the integral of net growth rate over the water column becomes zero. The net growth rate equals the gross photosynthetic rate minus loss terms. Gross photosynthesis exponentially decays from a maximum near the surface to approach zero with depth. It is affected by the amount and angle of solar radiation and the clarity of the water. The loss rate is the sum of cellular respiration, grazing, sinking, advection, viral lysis, and mortality In his hypothesis, Sverdrup made the approximation that the loss rate for a phytoplankton community is constant at all depths and times.

The depth where the net growth rate is zero is referred to as the compensation depth (only 0.1–1% of solar radiation penetrates). Above this depth the population is growing, while below it the population shrinks. At a certain depth below it, the total population losses equal the total population gains. This is the critical depth.

== Critical depth hypothesis ==
=== Assumptions ===
Sverdrup’s critical depth hypothesis or model is built on several strict assumptions:

- Turbulence in the thoroughly mixed top layer is strong enough to distribute the phytoplankton evenly throughout the mixed layer.
- Phytoplankton loss rate is independent of depth and of growth rate.
- Nutrients in the mixed layer are high enough that production is not nutrient limited
- Daily photosynthetic production of the phytoplankton community at any depth is proportional to the mean daily light energy at that depth.

That is, light is assumed to be the only factor that limits the growth of phytoplankton during pre-bloom months and the light a phytoplankton community is subject to be determined by the incident irradiance and the coefficient of light extinction.

=== Mechanism ===
Sverdrup’s research results suggested that the shoaling of the mixed layer depth to a depth above the critical depth was the cause of spring blooms. When the mixed layer depth exceeds the critical depth, mixing of the water brings so much of the phytoplankton population below the compensation depth where photosynthesis is impossible that the overall population cannot increase in biomass. However, when the mixed layer becomes shallower than the critical depth, enough of the phytoplankton remain above the compensation depth to give the community a positive net growth rate. Sverdrup’s model is a cause and effect relationship between the depth of the mixed layer versus the critical depth and the bloom of phytoplankton.

This trigger occurs in the spring due to seasonal changes in the critical depth and mixed layer depth. The critical depth deepens in the spring because of the increased amount of solar radiation and the decrease in the angle it hits the earth. During the winter, strong winds and storms vigorously mix the water, leaving a thick mixed layer to bring up nutrient-rich waters from depth. As the average winds decrease from the winter storms and the ocean is heated, the vertical water column becomes increasingly stratified and the mixed layer depth decreases.

Sverdrup’s Critical Depth Hypothesis is limited to explaining what initiates a spring bloom. It does not predict its magnitude. Additionally, it does not address any population controls after the initial bloom, such as nutrient limitation or predator-prey interaction with zooplankton.

=== Regional applicability ===
Since 1953, scientists have examined the applicability of Sverdrup's Critical Depth (SCD hereafter) theory in different regions around the world. Semina (1960) found that SCD hypothesis does not apply well in the Bering Sea near Kamchatka, where the bloom is more limited by stability, nutrients, and grazing than by light. Obata et al.(1996) concluded that SCD theory works well at middle and high latitudes of the western North Pacific and the North Atlantic, but it is not able to explain how the spring bloom occurs in the eastern North Pacific and the Southern Ocean. Siegel et al. (2002) deduced that eastern North Atlantic Basin south of 40°N is likely limited by nutrients rather than light and hence is another region where SCD hypothesis would not be well applied. Behrenfeld (2010) also reported that SCD doesn’t apply well in Subarctic Atlantic regions.

Most research used hydrographically defined mixed layer depth, which is not a good proxy for turbulence-driven movement of the phytoplankton and hence might not properly test the applicability of SCD hypothesis, as argued in Franks (2014). The variable regional applicability of SCD has motivated researchers to find alternate biological and physical mechanisms for spring boom initiation in addition to the mechanism proposed by Sverdrup.

== Criticisms ==
The main criticisms of Sverdrup's hypothesis result from its assumptions. One of the greatest limitations to understanding the cycle of spring phytoplankton blooms is the assumption that loss rates of phytoplankton in the vertical water column are constant. As more becomes known about phytoplankton loss rate components (such as grazing, respiration, and vertical export of sinking particles), Sverdrup’s hypothesis has come under increasing criticism. Smetacek and Passow published a paper in 1990 that challenged the model on the basis that phytoplankton cellular respiration is not constant, but is a function of growth rate, depth, and other factors. They claimed that net growth depended on irradiation, species physiology, grazing, and parasitic pressures in addition to mixed layer depth. They also point out that Sverdrup’s model included respiration of the entire community (including zooplankton) rather than solely photosynthetic organisms.

Sverdrup himself offered criticism of his model when he stated that "a phytoplankton population may increase independently of the thickness of the mixed layer if the turbulence is moderate." He also said that advection rather than local growth could be responsible for the bloom he observed, and that the first increase in plankton biomass occurred before the shoaling of the mixed layer, hinting to more complex processes initiating the spring bloom.

Although Sverdrup pointed out that there is a difference between a uniform-density mixed layer and a turbulent layer, his theory is criticized for the lack of emphasis placed on how the intensity of turbulence could affect blooms. In 1999, using a numerical model, Huisman et al. formulated a "critical turbulence" hypothesis, based on the idea that spring blooms can occur even in deep mixed layers as long as turbulence stays below a critical value so that phytoplankton have enough time in the euphotic zone to absorb light. This hypothesis points to the difference between a mixed layer and an actively turbulent layer that could play a more important role.

== Current considerations ==
Despite criticism of Sverdrup's Critical Depth Hypothesis, it is still regularly cited due to unresolved questions surrounding the initiation of spring blooms. Since its introduction, Sverdrup’s hypothesis has provided a framework for future research, facilitating a wide range of studies that address its assumptions. With the advancement of interdisciplinary knowledge and technological capabilities, it has become easier to expand on Sverdrup’s basic theory for critical depth using methods that were not available at the time of its original publication.

Many studies seek to address the shortcomings of the theory by using modern observational and modeling approaches to explain how various biological and physical processes affect the initiation of spring blooms in addition to critical depth. This has led to several theories describing its initiation mechanisms that add complexity to the original theory. Theories involving the role of physiological characteristics, grazing, nutrient availability, and upper ocean physics are active areas of research on spring blooms.

=== Dilution recoupling hypothesis ===
Michael Behrenfeld proposes the "dilution recoupling hypothesis" to describe the occurrence of annual spring blooms. He emphasized that phytoplankton growth is balanced by losses, and the balance is controlled by seasonally varying physical processes. He argued that the occurrence of optimum growth conditions allows for both the growth of predator and prey, which results in increased interactions between the two; it recouples predator-prey interactions. He describes this relationship as being diluted (fewer interactions) in the winter, when the mixed layer is deep and stratification of the water column is minimal. Similar observations were described by Landry and Hassett (1982).

The most prominent evidence supporting Behrenfeld's hypothesis is that phytoplankton blooms occur before optimal growth conditions as predicted by mixed depth shoaling, when the phytoplankton concentrations are more diluted. As stratification is established and the biomass of zooplankton increases, grazing increases and the phytoplankton biomass declines over time. Behrenfeld’s research also modeled respiration as being inversely proportional to phytoplankton growth (as growth rate decreases, respiration rate increases). Behrenfeld’s model proposes the opposite relationship of phytoplankton growth rate to mixed layer depth than Sverdrup’s: that it is maximized when the layer is deepest and phytoplankton most diluted.

=== Critical turbulence hypothesis ===
Another shortcoming of Sverdrup's model was that he did not consider the role of active turbulence in the mixed layer. Upper ocean turbulence can result from many sources, including thermal convection, wind, waves, and Langmuir circulation. It mixes the upper layer by overturning fluid and particles, reducing the stratification in which spring blooms thrive. Huisman et al. (1999) proposed a critical turbulence mechanism in addition to critical depth that explains how spring blooms can be initiated even in the absence of surface-warming stratification. This mechanism relies on a critical turbulence level over which vertical mixing rate due to turbulence is higher than phytoplankton growth rate.

When the atmospheric cooling becomes weak in the spring, turbulence subsides rapidly, but the mixed layer takes a longer time to react; restratification of the mixed layer occurs on timescales of weeks to months, while reduction of turbulence takes effect almost immediately after forcing stops (i.e. after atmospheric cooling shifts to warming). This could explain why the onset of the bloom can occur prior to the time when the mixed layer restratifies above the critical depth; reduced turbulence ceases overturning, allowing phytoplankton to have a longer residence time in the photic zone to bloom.

This theory has been explored by Taylor & Ferrari (2011) using 3D Large eddy simulation (LES) turbulence modeling to study how the shutdown of thermal convection (i.e. convective overturning resulting from cooling of the ocean surface) can halt upper ocean turbulence and initiate a bloom before the mixed layer shoals to the critical depth. Unlike Huisman et al., they employed a vertically varying turbulent diffusivity in their model instead of a constant diffusivity, addressing whether the mixed layer is truly "thoroughly mixed" if temperature and density are vertically constant but turbulence intensity is not. Their findings were further supported in Ferrari et al. (2015) by remote sensing of chlorophyll using ocean color measurements from the NASA MODIS Aqua satellite and air-sea heat flux measurements from ECMWF re-analysis ERA-interim data to correlate high chlorophyll concentrations to changes in surface heat flux.

Enriquez & Taylor (2015) took Taylor & Ferrari’s work a step further by using an LES model to compare the influence of thermal convective mixing to wind-induced mixing for spring bloom initiation. By assigning varying values for wind stress and surface heat flux, they were able to develop parameterizations for mixing depth and turbulent diffusivity using the LES model, and apply them to a phytoplankton model to monitor the response. They found that very little wind-induced turbulence is needed to prevent a bloom (consistent with Taylor & Ferrari) and that wind stress and heat flux interact such that the addition of surface heating (at the end of winter, for example) causes a sharp increase in the intensity of wind stress needed to prevent a bloom. This research has implications for the significance of different sources of turbulence in spring bloom inhibition.

Brody & Lozier (2015) also support the idea that depth of active mixing in the mixed layer controls the timing of the spring bloom. Using Lagrangian floats and gliders, they were able to correlate reduced mixed layer turbulence to increased photosynthetic activity by comparing observational data of active mixing profiles to biomass depth profiles.

=== Onset of stratification ===
Stephen Chiswell proposes the “Onset of Stratification Hypothesis” to describe both the annual cycle of primary production and the occurrence of annual spring blooms in temperate waters. Chiswell shows that the observations made by Behrenfeld can be interpreted in a way that adheres to the conventional idea that the spring bloom represents a change from a deep-mixed regime to a shallow light-driven regime. Chiswell shows that the Critical Depth Hypothesis is flawed because its basic assumption that phytoplankton are well mixed throughout the upper mixed layer is wrong. Instead, Chiswell suggests that plankton are well mixed throughout the upper mixed layer only in autumn and winter, but in spring shallow near-surface warm layers appear with the onset of stratification. These layers support the spring bloom. In his Stratification Onset Hypothesis, Chiswell discusses two hypothetical oceans. One ocean is similar to that discussed by Berenfeld, where total water column production can be positive in winter, but the second hypothetical ocean is one where net production in winter is negative. Chiswell thus suggests that the mechanisms of the Dilution Recoupling Hypothesis are incidental, rather than a cause of the spring bloom.

=== Physiological considerations ===
In addition to abiotic factors, recent studies have also examined the role of individual phytoplankton traits that may lead to the initiation of the spring bloom. Models have suggested that these variable, cell-specific parameters, previously fixed by Sverdrup, could play an important role in predicting the onset of a bloom. Some of these factors might include:

- Production terms: Cell growth rate, cell division rate
- Loss terms: Grazing resistance, viral infection rate
- Fitness: photoadaptation to light conditions, respiration rates for a given environment, maintenance metabolism cost, nutrient uptake kinetics, life history, composition of photosynthetic pigments, cost of biosynthesis

Given the high spatial and temporal variability of their physical environment, certain phytoplankton species might possess an optimal fitness profile for a given pre-bloom environment over competitors. This physiological profile might also influence its pre-bloom growth rate. For this reason, Lewandowska et al. propose that each phytoplankton has a specific critical depth. If none of the constituent pre-bloom species meet the environmental requirements, no bloom will occur.

Direct evidence for the role of physiological factors in bloom initiation has been difficult to acquire. Using decades of satellite data, Behrenfeld and Boss argued that physiological adaptations to the environment were not significantly linked to bloom initiation (measured via cell division rate). However, recent results from Hunter-Cevera et al. using an automated submersible flow cytometer over 13 years show a positive correlation between temperature and cell division rate in Synechococcus. Warmer waters led to higher cell division rates and “shifts in the timing of spring blooms reflect a direct physiological response to shifts in the onset of seasonal warming.”
