= S. George Philander =

South African scientist

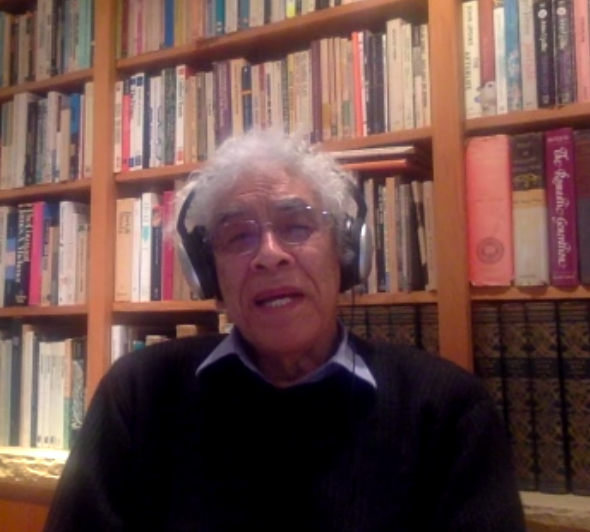
- George Philander in October 2020.
- Born: Samuel George Harker Philander; July 25, 1942; Caledon, South Africa
- Education: University of Cape Town; Harvard University
- Awards: Vetlesen Prize (2017)
- Scientific career
- Fields: Geophysics
- Workplaces: Princeton University
- Thesis: The Equatorial Dynamics of an Homogeneous Ocean (1970)

External videos
- "Two Scientists Win 2017 Vetlesen Prize", 2017.

Samuel George Harker Philander (born July 25, 1942, Caledon, South Africa) is a climate scientist, known for his work on atmospheric circulation and oceanic currents, particularly El Niño. He is the Knox Taylor Professor emeritus of Geosciences at Princeton University.

Among his published works written for a broad audience are Our Affair with El Niño: How We Transformed an Enchanting Peruvian Current into a Global Climate Hazard and Is the Temperature Rising?: The Uncertain Science of Global Warming.

== Education ==
Samuel George Philander grew up in South Africa where his family was designated as "Colored" under the system of apartheid. Based on his end-of-high-school examinations in 1959, he was allowed to take classes at the University of Cape Town, but was still prohibited from extracurricular activities. In 1962 Philander received a B.S. in applied mathematics and physics from the University of Cape Town.

Philander was awarded a Fulbright grant to study at Harvard University in Cambridge, Massachusetts in the United States. There he studied fluid dynamics and physical oceanography, receiving his Ph.D. in 1970. His Ph.D. thesis dealt with the Equatorial Undercurrent as a component of global oceanic circulation. He then did postdoctoral work at Massachusetts Institute of Technology.

== Career ==
In 1970, Philander joined the Geophysical Fluid Dynamics Laboratory (GFDL) in Princeton, New Jersey, a research laboratory of the National Oceanic and Atmospheric Administration (NOAA), He became a senior research oceanographer at GFDL in 1978.

In 1990, Philander became a professor in the Department of Geosciences at Princeton University. He directed its Atmospheric and Oceanic Sciences (AOS) Program from 1990 to 2006 and chaired the Department of Geosciences from 1994 to 2001. In 2005, he received the named chair of Knox Taylor Professor of Geosciences. From 2007-2010 Philander worked to establish an African Climate Sciences Centre (ACCESS), with the most notable outcome being the "Habitable Planet Programme" (2007-current); a national science education programme with goals around the decolonisation of climate change research in Africa. In 2017, he became the Knox Taylor Professor of Geosciences, Emeritus.

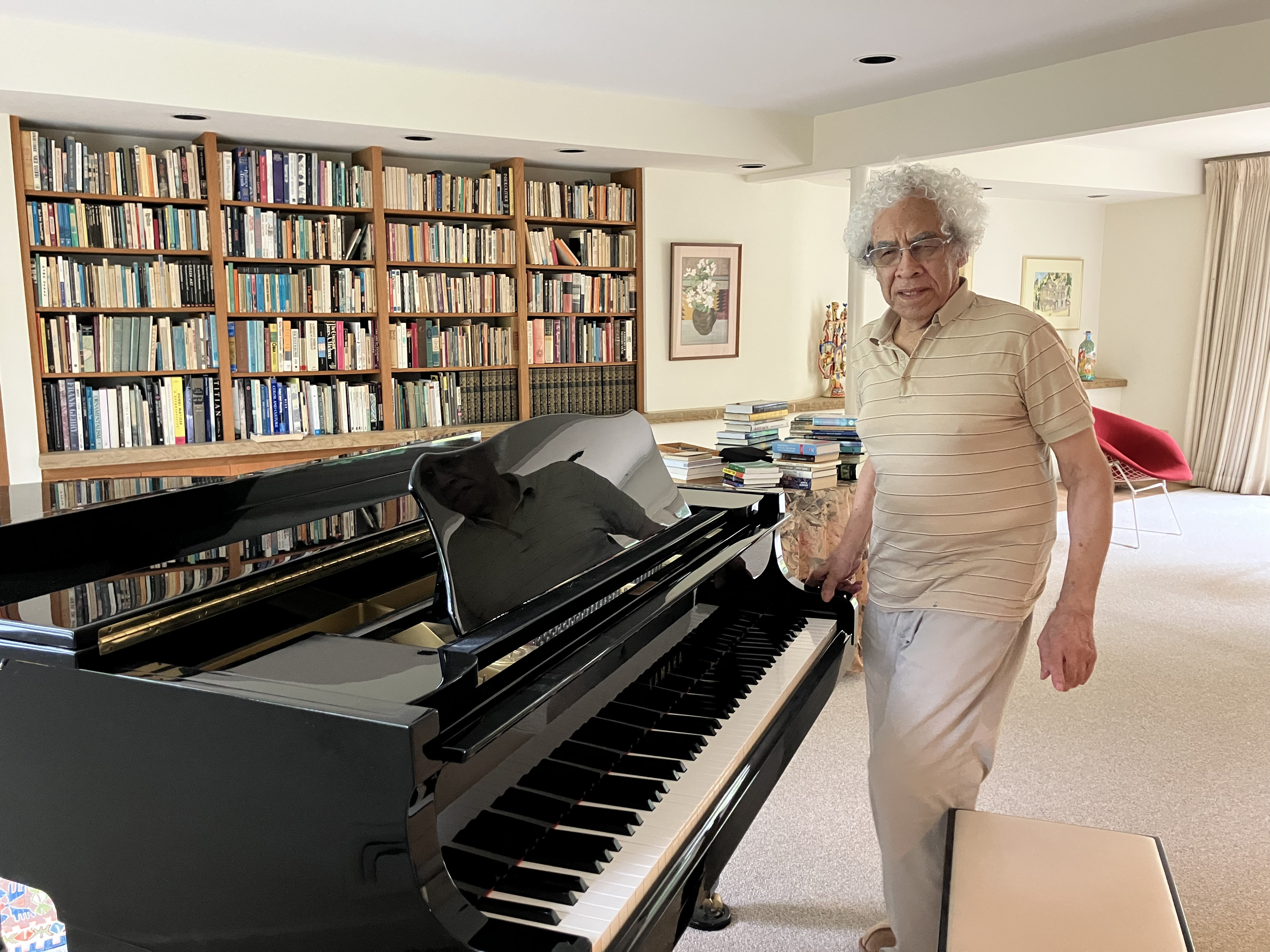
George Philander in August 2025

== Research ==
Philander has studied oceanic circulation, identifying patterns of interaction between ocean and atmosphere that are responsible for the phenomena of El Niño and La Niña and the El Niño–Southern Oscillation. He coined the name "La Niña". His work on Paleoclimatology and his examination of geological data showing past changes to the climate has helped to develop models for the prediction of weather, the impacts of global warming, and global climate change in future.

== Selected awards ==
- 2017, Vetlesen Prize, with Mark Cane
- 2010, Fellow, Academy of Science of South Africa
- 2007, Fellow, The World Academy of Sciences (TWAS)
- 2004, Member, U. S. National Academy of Sciences
- 2003, Member, American Academy of Arts and Sciences
- 1991, Fellow, American Geophysical Union
- 1986, Fellow, American Meteorological Society

== Books ==
- El Niño, La Niña and the Southern Oscillation. 289 pp., Academic Press, 1990.
- Is the Temperature Rising? The Uncertain Science of Global Warming. 254 pp., Princeton University Press, 1998.
- Our Affair with El Niño. How we Transformed an Enchanting Peruvian Current into a Global Climate Hazard. 275 pp., Princeton University Press, 2004.
- Encyclopedia of Global Warming and Climate Change. (as editor). (Vols. 1-3). SAGE Publications, Inc., 2012. https://doi.org/10.4135/9781452218564

== Selected academic papers ==
- Philander, S. George (1 May 2009). "Where Are You From? Why Are You Here? An African Perspective on Global Warming". Annual Review of Earth and Planetary Sciences. 37 (1): 1–18. Bibcode:2009AREPS..37....1P. doi:10.1146/annurev.earth.031208.100128. ISSN 0084-6597.
- Philander, S. George; Fedorov, Alexey (May 2003). "Is El Niño Sporadic or Cyclic?". Annual Review of Earth and Planetary Sciences. 31 (1): 579–594. Bibcode:2003AREPS..31..579P. doi:10.1146/annurev.earth.31.100901.141255. ISSN 0084-6597.
- Gu D. and S. G. H. Philander, Interdecadal Climate Fluctuations that depend on Exchanges between the Tropics and Extratropics, Science, 275, 805–807, 1997.
- Philander, S. G. H. (March 1983). "El Niño Southern Oscillation phenomena". Nature. 302 (5906): 295–301. Bibcode:1983Natur.302..295P. doi:10.1038/302295a0. ISSN 1476-4687. S2CID 27624287.
- Philander, S. G. H., Instabilities of Zonal Equatorial Currents, 2, J. Geophys.Res., 83(C7), 3679–3682, 1978.
- Philander, S. G. H., Instabilities of Zonal Equatorial Currents, J. Geophys. Res., 81(21), 3721–3725, 1976.
- Philander, S. G. H., The Equatorial Undercurrent: Measurements and Theories, Rev. Geophys. and Space Physics, 11(3), 513–570, 1973.
- Philander, S. G. H., The Equatorial Dynamics of a Deep Homogeneous Ocean, Geophys. Fluid Dynamics Journal, 3, 105–123, 1972
- Philander, S. G. H., The Equatorial Dynamics of a Shallow Homogeneous Ocean, Geophys. Fluid Dynamics Journal, 2, 219–245, 1971.
