= Mark Cane =

American climate scientist

- Education: Massachusetts Institute of Technology (PhD, 1975)
- Known for: Numerical prediction of El Niño–Southern Oscillation; Zebiak–Cane model
- Title: G. Unger Vetlesen Professor of Earth and Climate Sciences
- Awards: Sverdrup Gold Medal (1992); Maurice Ewing Medal (2013); Vetlesen Prize (2017)
- Scientific career
- Fields: Climatology, meteorology, earth sciences
- Workplaces: Columbia University; Lamont–Doherty Earth Observatory
- Doctoral advisor: Jule Charney

Mark A. Cane is an American climate scientist. He obtained his PhD at MIT in 1975. He is currently the G. Unger Vetlesen Professor of Earth and Climate Sciences at Columbia University and the Lamont Doherty Earth Observatory. He actively pursues several research and teaching initiatives, and supports the Columbia climate kids corner . As of November 11, 2015, his publications have been cited over 22,600 times, and he has an h-index of 75.

He was involved in the first numerical prediction of El Niño-Southern Oscillation in 1986.

== Education ==
Mark Cane was the Valedictorian of the June 1961 graduation class of Midwood High School. He went on to study in Boston, receiving a A.B. in Applied Mathematics in 1965. He went on to do graduate work at Massachusetts Institute of Technology, receiving his Ph.D. in Meteorology in just three years under the guidance of thesis advisor Jule Charney. He continued post-doctoral work at M.I.T., becoming a member of the group of ground-breaking earth scientists who referred to themselves as "the 14th floor".

== Selected publications ==
- Zebiak, S.E. & M.A. Cane (1987). "A Model El Niño–Southern Oscillation". Mon. Wea. Rev. 115 (10): 2262–2278. doi:10.1175/1520-0493(1987)115<2262:AMENO>2.0.CO;2.

== Selected awards ==
- 2017 Vetlesen Prize
- 2015 The Oceanography Society Member
- 2013 National Academy of Sciences Member
- 2013 Maurice Ewing Medal of the American Geophysical Union
- 2009 Norbert Gerbier-MUMM International Award from the World Meteorological Organization
- 2007 California Department of Water Resources – Climate Science paper award
- 2004–2007 Earth and Planetary Science Letters Most Cited Paper
- 2003 Bronze Award for Magazines Feature Article, 25,001 to 100,000 to “American Scientist “Ethnoclimatology in the Andes”
- 2003 Cody Award in Ocean Sciences from Scripps Institution of Oceanography
- 2002 American Academy of Arts and Sciences Fellow
- 1995 American Association for the Advancement of Science Fellow
- 1995 American Geophysical Union Fellow
- 1993 Fellow, American Meteorological Society
- 1992 Sverdrup Medal of the American Meteorological Society
- 1984–1986 National Science Foundation Creativity Award
