= Spring bloom =

Increase in phytoplankton abundance that typically occurs in early spring

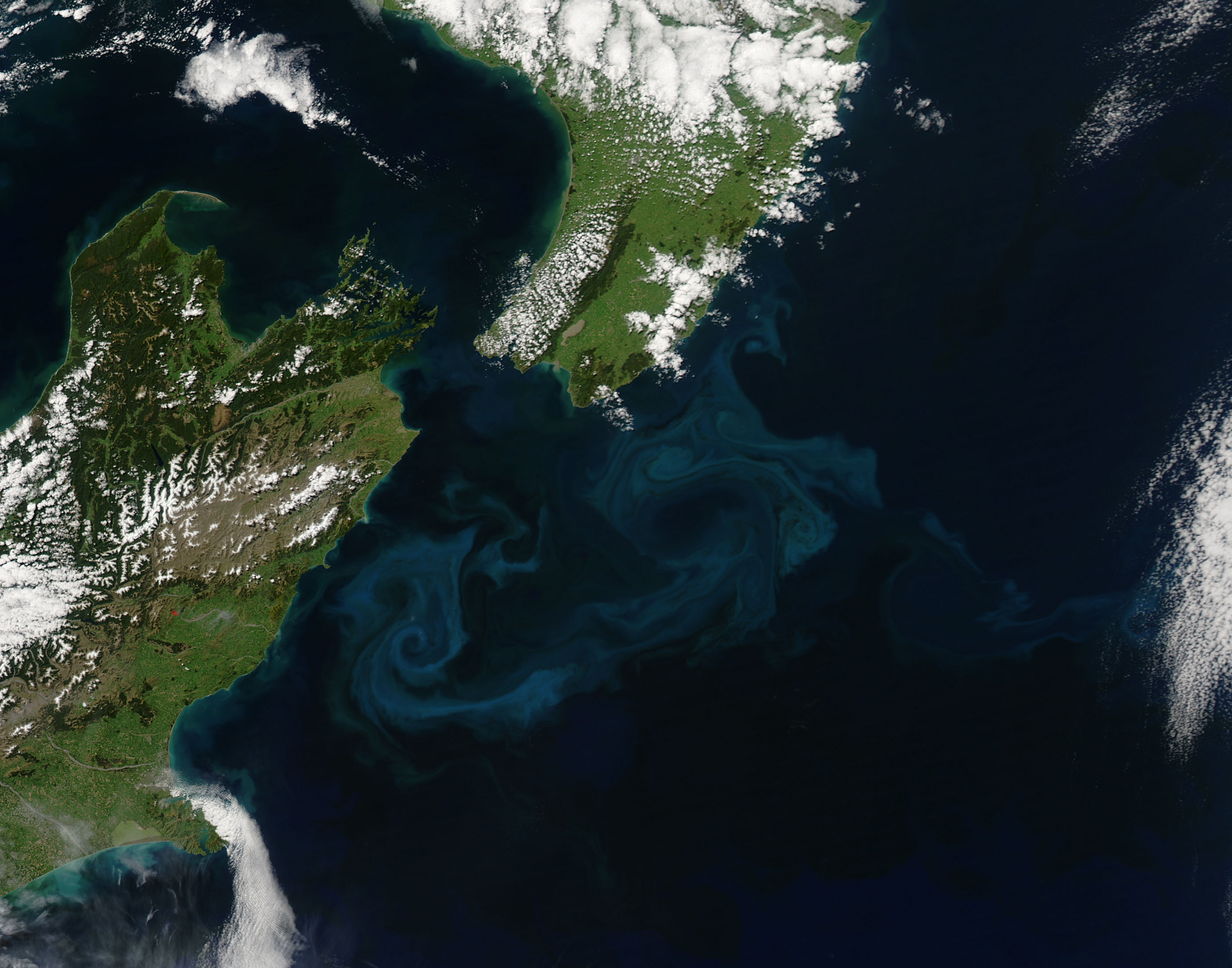
Spring bloom in the currents off the coast of New Zealand. Especially bright blue areas may indicate the presence of phytoplankton called coccolithophores, which are coated with calcium carbonate scales that are very reflective. The duller greenish-brown areas of the bloom may be diatoms, which have a silica-based covering.

The spring bloom is a strong increase in phytoplankton abundance (i.e. stock) that typically occurs in the early spring and lasts until late spring or early summer. This seasonal event is characteristic of temperate North Atlantic, sub-polar, and coastal waters. Phytoplankton blooms occur when growth exceeds losses, however there is no universally accepted definition of the magnitude of change or the threshold of abundance that constitutes a bloom. The magnitude, spatial extent and duration of a bloom depends on a variety of abiotic and biotic factors. Abiotic factors include light availability, nutrients, temperature, and physical processes that influence light availability, and biotic factors include grazing, viral lysis, and phytoplankton physiology. The factors that lead to bloom initiation are still actively debated (see Critical depth).

== Classical mechanism ==
In the spring, more light becomes available and stratification of the water column occurs as increasing temperatures warm the surface waters (referred to as thermal stratification). As a result, vertical mixing is inhibited and phytoplankton and nutrients are entrained in the euphotic zone. This creates a comparatively high nutrient and high light environment that allows rapid phytoplankton growth.

Along with thermal stratification, spring blooms can be triggered by salinity stratification due to freshwater input, from sources such as high river runoff. This type of stratification is normally limited to coastal areas and estuaries, including the Chesapeake Bay. Freshwater influences primary productivity in two ways. First, because freshwater is less dense, it rests on top of seawater and creates a stratified water column. Second, freshwater often carries nutrients that phytoplankton need to carry out processes, including photosynthesis.

Rapid increases in phytoplankton growth, that typically occur during the spring bloom, arise because phytoplankton can reproduce rapidly under optimal growth conditions (i.e., high nutrient levels, ideal light and temperature, and minimal losses from grazing and vertical mixing). In terms of reproduction, many species of phytoplankton can double at least once per day, allowing for exponential increases in phytoplankton stock size. For example, the stock size of a population that doubles once per day will increase 1000-fold in just 10 days. In addition, there is a lag in the grazing response of herbivorous zooplankton at the start of blooms, which minimizes phytoplankton losses. This lag occurs because there is low winter zooplankton abundance and many zooplankton, such as copepods, have longer generation times than phytoplankton.

Spring blooms typically last until late spring or early summer, at which time the bloom collapses due to nutrient depletion in the stratified water column and increased grazing pressure by zooplankton. The most limiting nutrient in the marine environment is typically nitrogen (N). This is because most organisms are unable to fix atmospheric nitrogen into usable forms (i.e. ammonium, nitrite, or nitrate). However, with the exception of coastal waters, it can be argued, that iron (Fe) is the most limiting nutrient because it is required to fix nitrogen, but is only available in small quantities in the marine environment, coming from dust storms and leaching from rocks. Phosphorus can also be limiting, particularly in freshwater environments and tropical coastal regions.

During winter, wind-driven turbulence and cooling water temperatures break down the stratified water column formed during the summer. This breakdown allows vertical mixing of the water column and replenishes nutrients from deep water to the surface waters and the rest of the euphotic zone. However, vertical mixing also causes high losses, as phytoplankton are carried below the euphotic zone (so their respiration exceeds primary production). In addition, reduced illumination (intensity and daily duration) during winter limits growth rates.

== Alternative mechanisms ==
Historically, blooms have been explained by Sverdrup's critical depth hypothesis, which says blooms are caused by shoaling of the mixed layer. Similarly, Winder and Cloern (2010) described spring blooms as a response to increasing temperature and light availability. However, new explanations have been offered recently, including that blooms occur due to:

- Coupling between phytoplankton growth and zooplankton grazing.
- The onset of near surface stratification in the spring.
- Mixing of the water column, rather than stratification
- Low turbulence
- Increasing light intensity (in shallow water environments).
- Eddies (see ‘The role of eddies in the onset of the North Atlantic spring bloom’)

== The role of eddies in the onset of the North Atlantic spring bloom ==
A 2012 study showed that the North Atlantic bloom could be triggered by eddies. Eddies, or circular currents of water, are ubiquitous throughout the world’s ocean and play an important role in ocean mixing. In the North Atlantic, surface water is colder and denser farther north and warmer and lighter in the south. This sets up a horizontal density gradient. Earth’s rotation maintains this gradient by preventing the dense water from slipping underneath the light water. Eddies, however, can mix dense water underneath the lighter water, setting up a vertical stratification that limits the depth of vertical mixing (leading to a shallower mixed layer).

Mechanisms that limit the depth of vertical mixing can be referred to as ‘restratifying mechanisms’ (e.g. eddies, solar heating), which compete against mechanisms that increase vertical mixing (and deepen the mixed layer). This includes convection and down-front winds. Convection is strongest in the winter when surface cooling is strongest. Convection increases the depth of vertical mixing, which can move phytoplankton away from the light they need to grow.

When convection weakens and wind switches direction in the spring, the re-stratifying effect of eddies becomes dominant. Phytoplankton are trapped closer to the surface, increasing their exposure to light. This spurs phytoplankton growth, leading to the onset of the North Atlantic spring bloom 20-30 days earlier than would occur with thermal stratification alone.

== Northward progression ==
At greater latitudes, spring blooms take place later in the year. This northward progression is because spring occurs later, delaying thermal stratification and increases in illumination that promote blooms. A study by Wolf and Woods (1988) showed evidence that spring blooms follow the northward migration of the 12 °C isotherm, suggesting that blooms may be controlled by temperature limitations, in addition to stratification.

At high latitudes, the shorter warm season commonly results in one mid-summer bloom. These blooms tend to be more intense than spring blooms of temperate areas because there is a longer duration of daylight for photosynthesis to take place. Also, grazing pressure tends to be lower because the generally cooler temperatures at higher latitudes slow zooplankton metabolism.

== Species succession ==
The spring bloom often consists of a series of sequential blooms of different phytoplankton species. Succession occurs because different species have optimal nutrient uptake at different ambient concentrations and reach their growth peaks at different times. Shifts in the dominant phytoplankton species are likely caused by biological and physical (i.e. environmental) factors. For instance, diatom growth rate becomes limited when the supply of silicate is depleted. Since silicate is not required by other phytoplankton, such as dinoflagellates, their growth rates continue to increase.

For example, in oceanic environments, diatoms (cell diameter greater than 10 to 70 μm or larger) typically dominate first because they are capable of growing faster. Once silicate is depleted in the environment, diatoms are succeeded by smaller dinoflagellates. This scenario has been observed in Rhode Island, as well as Massachusetts and Cape Cod Bay. By the end of a spring bloom, when most nutrients have been depleted, the majority of the total phytoplankton biomass is very small phytoplankton, known as ultraphytoplankton (cell diameter <5 to 10 μm). Ultraphytoplankton can sustain low, but constant stocks, in nutrient depleted environments because they have a larger surface area to volume ratio, which offers a much more effective rate of diffusion. The types of phytoplankton comprising a bloom can be determined by examination of the varying photosynthetic pigments found in chloroplasts of each species.

== Variability and the influence of climate change ==
Variability in the patterns (e.g., timing of onset, duration, magnitude, position, and spatial extent) of annual spring bloom events has been well documented. These variations occur due to fluctuations in environmental conditions, such as wind intensity, temperature, freshwater input, and light. Consequently, spring bloom patterns are likely sensitive to global climate change.

Links have been found between temperature and spring bloom patterns. For example, several studies have reported a correlation between earlier spring bloom onset and temperature increases over time. Furthermore, in Long Island Sound and the Gulf of Maine, blooms begin later in the year, are more productive, and last longer during colder years, while years that are warmer exhibit earlier, shorter blooms of greater magnitude.

Temperature may also regulate bloom sizes. In Narragansett Bay, Rhode Island, a study by Durbin et al. (1992) indicated that a 2 °C increase in water temperature resulted in a three-week shift in the maturation of the copepod, Acartia hudsonica, which could significantly increase zooplankton grazing intensity. Oviatt et al. (2002) noted a reduction in spring bloom intensity and duration in years when winter water temperatures were warmer. Oviatt et al. suggested that the reduction was due to increased grazing pressure, which could potentially become intense enough to prevent spring blooms from occurring altogether.

Miller and Harding (2007) suggested climate change (influencing winter weather patterns and freshwater influxes) was responsible for shifts in spring bloom patterns in the Chesapeake Bay. They found that during warm, wet years (as opposed to cool, dry years), the spatial extent of blooms was larger and was positioned more seaward. Also, during these same years, biomass was higher and peak biomass occurred later in the spring.

== See also ==
- Algal bloom
- Critical depth
- Gordon Arthur Riley
- Plankton
