= Meteorology =

Study of the atmosphere, focusing on weather forecasting

Meteorology is the scientific study of the Earth's atmosphere and short-term atmospheric phenomena (i.e., weather), with a focus on weather forecasting. It has applications in the military, aviation, energy production, transport, agriculture, construction, weather warnings, and disaster management.

Along with climatology, atmospheric physics, atmospheric chemistry, and aeronomy, meteorology forms the broader field of the atmospheric sciences. The interactions between Earth's atmosphere and its oceans (notably El Niño and La Niña) are studied in the interdisciplinary field of hydrometeorology. Other interdisciplinary areas include biometeorology, space weather, and planetary meteorology. Marine weather forecasting relates meteorology to maritime and coastal safety, based on atmospheric interactions with large bodies of water.

Meteorologists study meteorological phenomena driven by solar radiation, Earth's rotation, ocean currents, and other factors. These include everyday weather like clouds, precipitation, and wind patterns, as well as severe weather events such as tropical cyclones and severe winter storms. Such phenomena are quantified using variables like temperature, pressure, and humidity, which are then used to forecast weather at local (microscale), regional (mesoscale and synoptic scale), and global scales. Meteorologists collect data using basic instruments like thermometers, barometers, and weather vanes (for surface-level measurements), alongside advanced tools like weather satellites, balloons, reconnaissance aircraft, buoys, and radars. The World Meteorological Organization (WMO) ensures international standardization of meteorological research.

The study of meteorology dates back millennia. Ancient civilizations tried to predict weather through folklore, astrology, and religious rituals. Aristotle's treatise Meteorology sums up early observations of the field, which advanced little during early medieval times but experienced a resurgence during the Renaissance, when Alhazen and René Descartes challenged Aristotelian theories and emphasized scientific methods. In the 18th century, accurate measurement tools (e.g., barometer and thermometer) were developed, and the first meteorological society was founded. In the 19th century, telegraph-based weather observation networks were formed across broad regions. In the 20th century, numerical weather prediction (NWP), coupled with advanced satellite and radar technology, introduced sophisticated forecasting models. Later, computers revolutionized forecasting by processing vast datasets in real time and automatically solving modeling equations. 21st-century meteorology is highly accurate and driven by big data and supercomputing. It is adopting innovations like machine learning, ensemble forecasting, and high-resolution global climate modeling. Climate change–induced extreme weather poses new challenges for forecasting and research, while inherent uncertainty remains because of the atmosphere's chaotic nature (see butterfly effect).

== Etymology ==
The word meteorology is from the Ancient Greek μετέωρος metéōros (meteor) and -λογία -logia (-(o)logy).

Written around 340 B.C., Aristotle's book Meteorologica covers anything suspended in or falling from the sky, which included both shooting stars and weather phenomena. The word's first appearance in English was in 1563, in William Fulke's book Goodly Gallerye Causes of Meteors. Fulke uses the term "meteors" to include shooting stars, rain, snow, clouds, and even earthquakes. In modern usage, meteor typically refers to a shooting star, which is studied in astronomy rather than meteorology. However, meteor is still used in a meteorological context meaning any phenomenon "observed in the atmosphere or on the surface of the Earth".

== History ==
=== Ancient meteorology up to the time of Aristotle ===
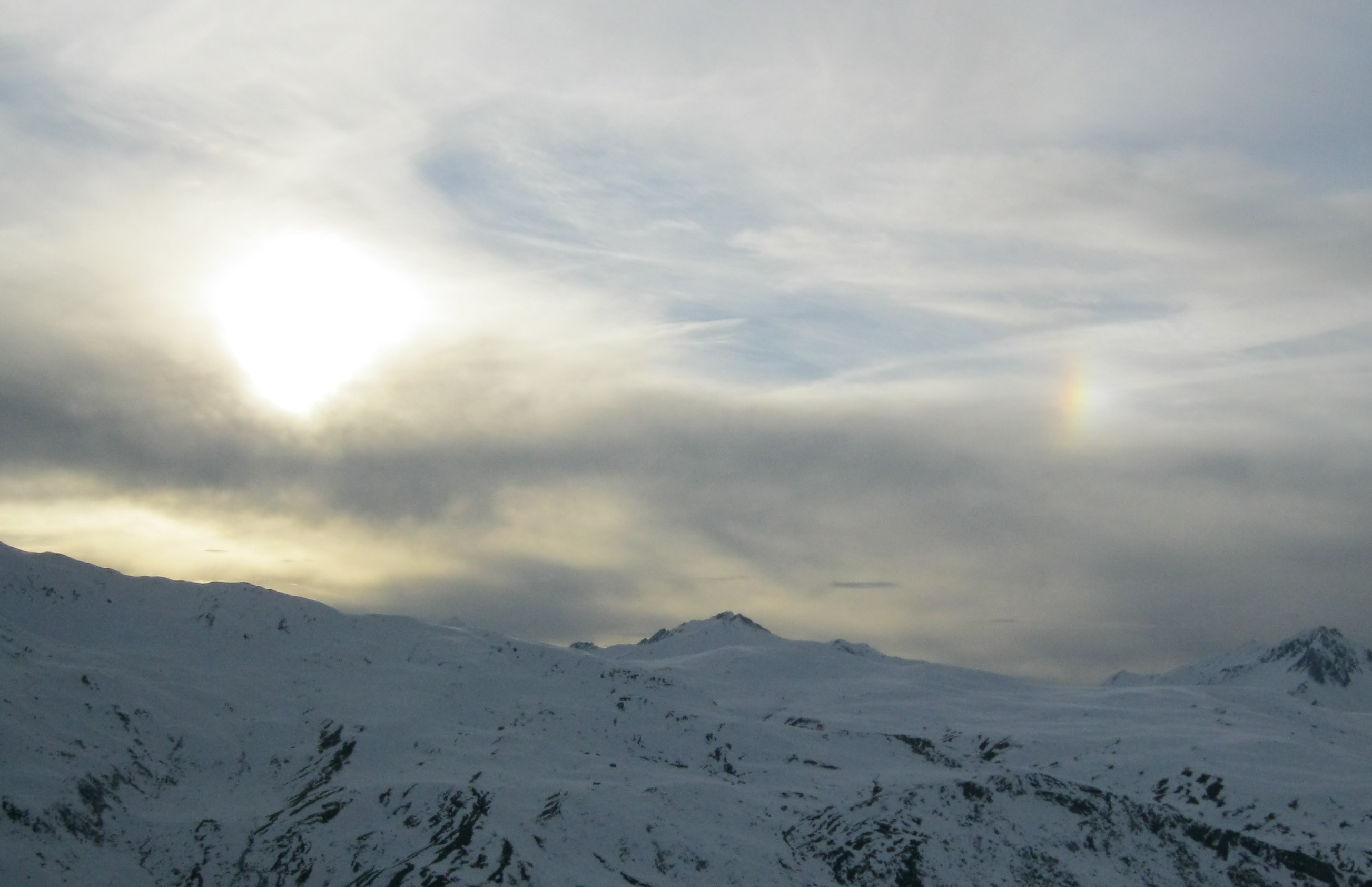
Sun dog in Savoie

Early attempts at predicting weather were often related to prophecy and divining, and were sometimes based on astrological ideas. Ancient religions believed meteorological phenomena to be under the control of the gods. The ability to predict rains and floods based on annual cycles was evidently used by humans at least from the time of agricultural settlement if not earlier. Early approaches to predicting weather were based on astrology and were practiced by priests. The Egyptians had rain-making rituals as early as around 3500 BC.

Ancient Indian Upanishads contain mentions of clouds and seasons. The Samaveda mentions sacrifices to be performed when certain phenomena were noticed. Varāhamihira's classical work Brihatsamhita, written about 500 AD, provides evidence of weather observation.

Cuneiform inscriptions on Babylonian tablets included associations between thunder and rain. The Chaldeans differentiated the 22° and 46° halos.

The ancient Greeks were the first to make theories about the weather. Many natural philosophers studied the weather. However, as meteorological instruments did not exist, the inquiry was largely qualitative, and could only be judged by more general theoretical speculations. Herodotus states that Thales predicted the solar eclipse of 585 BC. He studied Babylonian equinox tables. According to Seneca, he explained that the cause of the Nile's annual floods was due to northerly winds hindering its descent by the sea. Anaximander and Anaximenes thought that thunder and lightning was caused by air smashing against the cloud, thus kindling the flame. Early meteorological theories generally considered that there was a fire-like substance in the atmosphere. Anaximander defined wind as a flowing of air, but this was not generally accepted for centuries. A theory to explain summer hail was first proposed by Anaxagoras. He observed that air temperature decreased with increasing height and that clouds contain moisture. He also noted that heat caused objects to rise, and therefore the heat on a summer day would drive clouds to an altitude where the moisture would freeze. Empedocles theorized on the change of the seasons. He believed that fire and water opposed each other in the atmosphere, and when fire gained the upper hand, the result was summer, and when water did, it was winter. Democritus also wrote about the flooding of the Nile. He said that snow in northern parts of the world melted during the summer solstice. This would cause vapors to form clouds, which would cause storms when driven to the Nile by northerly winds, thus filling the lakes and the Nile. Hippocrates inquired into the effect of weather on health. Eudoxus claimed that bad weather followed four-year periods, according to Pliny.

=== Aristotelian meteorology ===
These early observations would form the basis for Aristotle's Meteorology, written in 350 BC. Aristotle is considered the founder of meteorology. One of the most impressive achievements described in the Meteorology is the description of what is now known as the hydrologic cycle. His work would remain an authority on meteorology for nearly 2,000 years.

The treatise On the Universe (composed before 250 BC or between 350 and 200 BC) noted:

If the flashing body is set on fire and rushes violently to the earth it is called a thunderbolt; if it be only half of fire, but violent also and massive, it is called a meteor; if it is entirely free from fire, it is called a smoking bolt. They are all called 'swooping bolts', because they swoop down upon the earth. Lightning is sometimes smoky, and is then called 'smouldering lightning'; sometimes it darts quickly along, and is then said to be 'vivid'; at other times it travels in crooked lines, and is called 'forked lightning'; when it swoops down upon some object it is called 'swooping lightning'.

After Aristotle, progress in meteorology stalled for a long time. Theophrastus compiled a book on weather forecasting, called the Book of Signs, as well as On Winds. He gave hundreds of signs for weather phenomena for a period up to a year. His system was based on dividing the year by the setting and the rising of the Pleiad, halves into solstices and equinoxes, and the continuity of the weather for those periods. He also divided months into the new moon, fourth day, eighth day and full moon, in likelihood of a change in the weather occurring. The day was divided into sunrise, mid-morning, noon, mid-afternoon and sunset, with corresponding divisions of the night, with change being likely at one of these divisions. Applying the divisions and a principle of balance in the yearly weather, he came up with forecasts like that if a lot of rain falls in the winter, the spring is usually dry. Rules based on actions of animals are also present in his work, like that if a dog rolls on the ground, it is a sign of a storm. Shooting stars and the Moon were also considered significant. However, he made no attempt to explain these phenomena, referring only to the Aristotelian method. The work of Theophrastus remained a dominant influence in weather forecasting for nearly 2,000 years.

=== Meteorology after Aristotle ===
Meteorology continued to be studied and developed over the centuries, but it was not until the Renaissance in the 14th to 17th centuries that significant advancements were made in the field. Scientists such as Galileo and Descartes introduced new methods and ideas, leading to the scientific revolution in meteorology.

Speculation on the cause of the flooding of the Nile ended when Eratosthenes, according to Proclus, stated that it was known that man had gone to the sources of the Nile and observed the rains, although interest in its implications continued.

During the era of Roman Greece and Europe, scientific interest in meteorology waned. In the 1st century BC, most natural philosophers claimed that the clouds and winds extended up to 111 miles, but Posidonius thought that they reached up to five miles, after which the air is clear, liquid and luminous. He closely followed Aristotle's theories. By the end of the second century BC, the center of science shifted from Athens to Alexandria, home to the ancient Library of Alexandria. In the 2nd century AD, Ptolemy's Almagest dealt with meteorology, because it was considered a subset of astronomy. He gave several astrological weather predictions. He constructed a map of the world divided into climatic zones by their illumination, in which the length of the Summer solstice increased by half an hour per zone between the equator and the Arctic. Ptolemy wrote on the atmospheric refraction of light in the context of astronomical observations.

In 25 AD, Pomponius Mela, a Roman geographer, formalized the climatic zone system. In 63–64 AD, Seneca wrote Naturales quaestiones. It was a compilation and synthesis of ancient Greek theories. However, theology was of foremost importance to Seneca, and he believed that phenomena such as lightning were tied to fate. The second book (chapter) of Pliny the Elder's Natural History covers meteorology. He states that more than twenty ancient Greek authors studied meteorology. He did not make any personal contributions, and the value of his work is in preserving earlier speculation, much like Seneca's work.

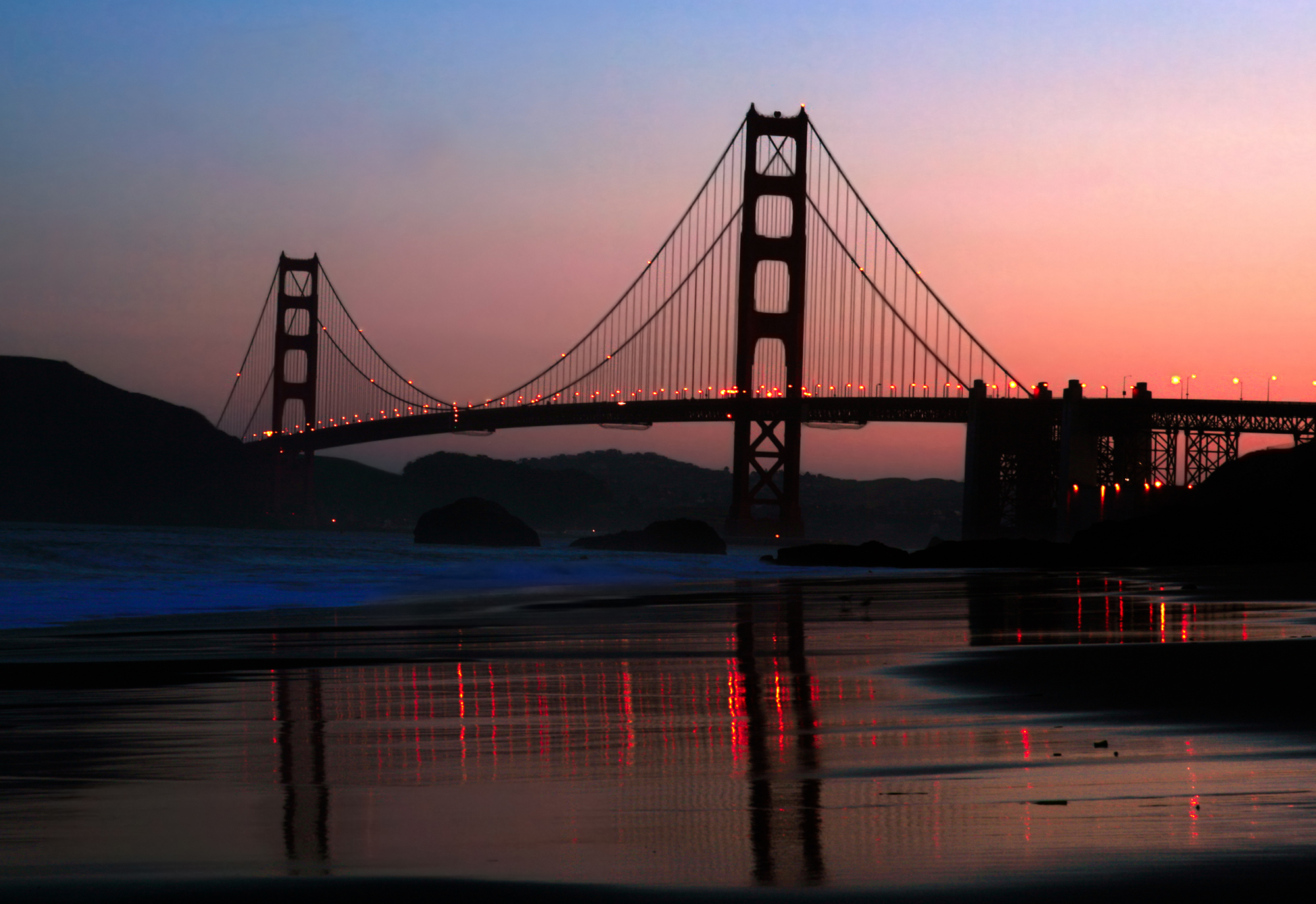
Twilight at Baker Beach

From 400 to 1100, scientific learning in Europe was preserved by the clergy. Isidore of Seville devoted a considerable attention to meteorology in Etymologiae, De ordine creaturum and De natura rerum. Bede the Venerable was the first Englishman to write about the weather in De natura rerum in 703. The work was a summary of then extant classical sources. However, Aristotle's works were largely lost until the 12th century, including Meteorologica. Isidore and Bede were scientifically minded, but they adhered to the letter of Scripture.

Islamic civilization translated many ancient works into Arabic which were transmitted and translated in western Europe to Latin.

In the 9th century, Al-Dinawari wrote the Kitab al-Nabat (Book of Plants), in which he deals with the application of meteorology to agriculture during the Arab Agricultural Revolution. He describes the meteorological character of the sky, the planets and constellations, the sun and moon, the lunar phases indicating seasons and rain, the anwa (heavenly bodies of rain), and atmospheric phenomena such as winds, thunder, lightning, snow, floods, valleys, rivers, lakes.

In 1021, Alhazen showed that atmospheric refraction is also responsible for twilight in Opticae thesaurus; he estimated that twilight begins when the sun is 19 degrees below the horizon, and also used a geometric determination based on this to estimate the maximum possible height of the Earth's atmosphere as 52,000 passim (about 49 miles, or 79 km).

Adelard of Bath was one of the early translators of the classics. He also discussed meteorological topics in his Quaestiones naturales. He thought dense air produced propulsion in the form of wind. He explained thunder by saying that it was due to ice colliding in clouds, and in Summer it melted. In the 13th century, Aristotelian theories reestablished dominance in meteorology. For the next four centuries, meteorological work by and large was mostly commentary. It has been estimated over 156 commentaries on the Meteorologica were written before 1650.

Experimental evidence was less important than appeal to the classics and authority in medieval thought. In the 13th century, Roger Bacon advocated experimentation and the mathematical approach. In his Opus majus, he followed Aristotle's theory on the atmosphere being composed of water, air, and fire, supplemented by optics and geometric proofs. He noted that Ptolemy's climatic zones had to be adjusted for topography.

Albertus Magnus was the first to propose that each drop of falling rain had the form of a small sphere, and that this form meant that the rainbow was produced by light interacting with each raindrop. Scientist and Franciscan friar Roger Bacon was the first to calculate the angular size of the rainbow. He stated that a rainbow summit cannot appear higher than 42 degrees above the horizon.

In the late 13th century and early 14th century, Kamāl al-Dīn al-Fārisī and Theodoric of Freiberg were the first to give the correct explanations for the primary rainbow phenomenon. Theodoric went further and also explained the secondary rainbow.

By the middle of the 16th century, meteorology had developed along two lines: theoretical science based on Meteorologica, and astrological weather forecasting. The pseudoscientific prediction by natural signs became popular and enjoyed protection of the church and princes. This was supported by scientists like Regiomontanus, Leonard Digges, and Johannes Kepler. However, there were skeptics. In the 14th century, Nicole Oresme believed that weather forecasting was possible, but that the rules for it were unknown at the time. Astrological influence in meteorology persisted until the 18th century.

Gerolamo Cardano's De Subilitate (1550) was the first work to challenge fundamental aspects of Aristotelian theory. Cardano maintained that there were only three basic elements- earth, air, and water. He discounted fire because it needed material to spread and produced nothing. Cardano thought there were two kinds of air: free air and enclosed air. The former destroyed inanimate things and preserved animate things, while the latter had the opposite effect.

René Descartes's Discourse on the Method (1637) typifies the beginning of the scientific revolution in meteorology. His scientific method had four principles: to never accept anything unless one clearly knew it to be true; to divide every difficult problem into small problems to tackle; to proceed from the simple to the complex, always seeking relationships; to be as complete and thorough as possible with no prejudice.

In the appendix Les Meteores, he applied these principles to meteorology. He discussed terrestrial bodies and vapors which arise from them, proceeding to explain the formation of clouds from drops of water, and winds, clouds then dissolving into rain, hail and snow. He also discussed the effects of light on the rainbow. Descartes hypothesized that all bodies were composed of small particles of different shapes and interwovenness. All of his theories were based on this hypothesis. He explained the rain as caused by clouds becoming too large for the air to hold, and that clouds became snow if the air was not warm enough to melt them, or hail if they met colder wind. Like his predecessors, Descartes's method was deductive, as meteorological instruments were not developed and extensively used yet. He introduced the Cartesian coordinate system to meteorology and stressed the importance of mathematics in natural science. His work established meteorology as a legitimate branch of physics.

In the 18th century, the invention of the thermometer and barometer allowed for more accurate measurements of temperature and pressure, leading to a better understanding of atmospheric processes. This century also saw the birth of the first meteorological society, the Societas Meteorologica Palatina in 1780.

In the 19th century, advances in technology such as the telegraph and photography led to the creation of weather observing networks and the ability to track storms. Additionally, scientists began to use mathematical models to make predictions about the weather. The 20th century saw the development of radar and satellite technology, which greatly improved the ability to observe and track weather systems. In addition, meteorologists and atmospheric scientists started to create the first weather forecasts and temperature predictions.

In the 20th and 21st centuries, with the advent of computer models and big data, meteorology has become increasingly dependent on numerical methods and computer simulations. This has greatly improved weather forecasting and climate predictions. Additionally, meteorology has expanded to include other areas such as air quality, atmospheric chemistry, and climatology. The advancement in observational, theoretical and computational technologies has enabled ever more accurate weather predictions and understanding of weather pattern and air pollution. In current time, with the advancement in weather forecasting and satellite technology, meteorology has become an integral part of everyday life, and is used for many purposes such as aviation, agriculture, and disaster management.

=== Instruments and classification scales ===
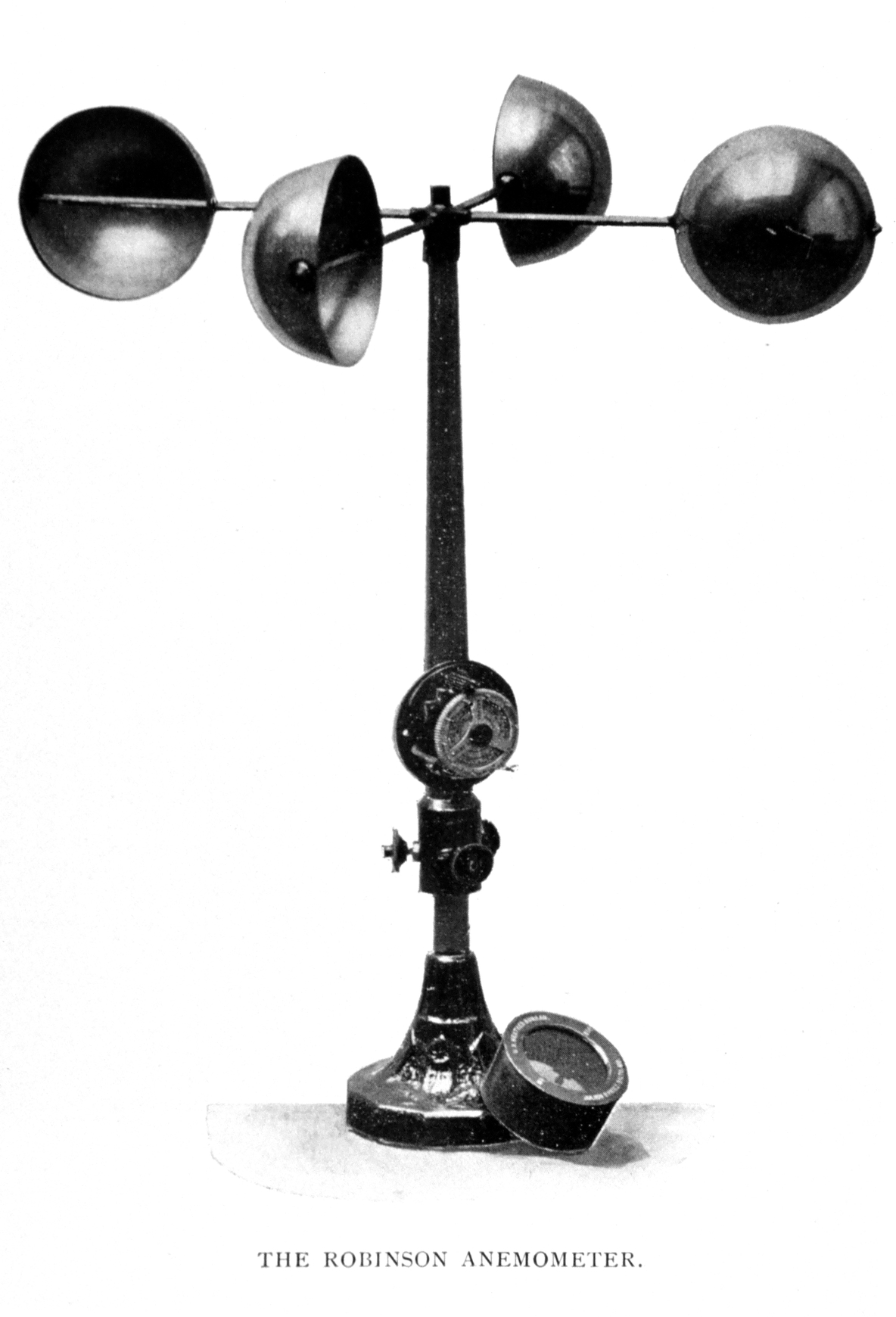
A hemispherical cup anemometer

In 1441, King Sejong's son, Prince Munjong of Korea, invented the first standardized rain gauge. These were sent throughout the Joseon dynasty of Korea as an official tool to assess land taxes based upon a farmer's potential harvest. In 1450, Leone Battista Alberti developed a swinging-plate anemometer, and was known as the first anemometer. In 1607, Galileo Galilei constructed a thermoscope. In 1611, Johannes Kepler wrote the first scientific treatise on snow crystals: "Strena Seu de Nive Sexangula (A New Year's Gift of Hexagonal Snow)". In 1643, Evangelista Torricelli invented the mercury barometer. In 1662, Sir Christopher Wren invented the mechanical, self-emptying, tipping bucket rain gauge. In 1714, Gabriel Fahrenheit created a reliable scale for measuring temperature with a mercury-type thermometer. In 1742, Anders Celsius, a Swedish astronomer, proposed the "centigrade" temperature scale, the predecessor of the current Celsius scale. In 1783, the first hair hygrometer was demonstrated by Horace-Bénédict de Saussure. In 1802–1803, Luke Howard wrote On the Modification of Clouds, in which he assigns cloud types Latin names. In 1806, Francis Beaufort introduced his system for classifying wind speeds. Near the end of the 19th century the first cloud atlases were published, including the International Cloud Atlas, which has remained in print ever since. The April 1960 launch of the first successful weather satellite, TIROS-1, marked the beginning of the age where weather information became available globally.

=== Atmospheric composition research ===
In 1648, Blaise Pascal rediscovered that atmospheric pressure decreases with height, and deduced that there is a vacuum above the atmosphere. In 1738, Daniel Bernoulli published Hydrodynamics, initiating the kinetic theory of gases and established the basic laws for the theory of gases.

In 1761, Joseph Black discovered that ice absorbs heat without changing its temperature when melting. In 1772, Black's student Daniel Rutherford discovered nitrogen, which he called phlogisticated air, and together they developed the phlogiston theory. In 1777, Antoine Lavoisier discovered oxygen and developed an explanation for combustion. In 1783, in Lavoisier's essay "Reflexions sur le phlogistique", he deprecates the phlogiston theory and proposes a caloric theory.

In 1804, John Leslie observed that a matte black surface radiates heat more effectively than a polished surface, suggesting the importance of black-body radiation. In 1808, John Dalton defended caloric theory in A New System of Chemistry and described how it combines with matter, especially gases; he proposed that the heat capacity of gases varies inversely with atomic weight. In 1824, Sadi Carnot analyzed the efficiency of steam engines using caloric theory; he developed the notion of a reversible process and, in postulating that no such thing exists in nature, laid the foundation for the second law of thermodynamics. In 1716, Edmond Halley suggested that aurorae are caused by "magnetic effluvia" moving along the Earth's magnetic field lines.

=== Research into cyclones and air flow ===
General circulation of the Earth's atmosphere: The westerlies and trade winds are part of the Earth's atmospheric circulation.

In 1494, Christopher Columbus experienced a tropical cyclone, which led to the first written European account of a hurricane. In 1686, Edmond Halley presented a systematic study of the trade winds and monsoons and identified solar heating as the cause of atmospheric motions. In 1735, an ideal explanation of global circulation through study of the trade winds was written by George Hadley. In 1743, when Benjamin Franklin was prevented from seeing a lunar eclipse by a hurricane, he decided that cyclones move in a contrary manner to the winds at their periphery. Understanding the kinematics of how exactly the rotation of the Earth affects airflow was partial at first. Gaspard-Gustave Coriolis published a paper in 1835 on the energy yield of machines with rotating parts, such as waterwheels. In 1856, William Ferrel proposed the existence of a circulation cell in the mid-latitudes, and the air within deflected by the Coriolis force resulting in the prevailing westerly winds. Late in the 19th century, the motion of air masses along isobars was understood to be the result of the large-scale interaction of the pressure gradient force and the deflecting force. By 1912, this deflecting force was named the Coriolis effect. Just after World War I, a group of meteorologists in Norway led by Vilhelm Bjerknes developed the Norwegian cyclone model that explains the generation, intensification and ultimate decay (the life cycle) of mid-latitude cyclones, and introduced the idea of fronts, that is, sharply defined boundaries between air masses. The group included Carl-Gustaf Rossby (who was the first to explain the large scale atmospheric flow in terms of fluid dynamics), Tor Bergeron (who first determined how rain forms) and Jacob Bjerknes.

=== Observation networks and weather forecasting ===
Cloud classification by altitude of occurrence

This "Hyetographic or Rain Map of the World" was first published 1848 by Alexander Keith Johnston.

This "Hyetographic or Rain Map of Europe" was also published in 1848 as part of "The Physical Atlas".

In the late 16th century and first half of the 17th century a range of meteorological instruments were invented – the thermometer, barometer, hydrometer, as well as wind and rain gauges. In the 1650s natural philosophers started using these instruments to systematically record weather observations. Scientific academies established weather diaries and organised observational networks. In 1654, Ferdinando II de Medici established the first weather observing network, that consisted of meteorological stations in Florence, Cutigliano, Vallombrosa, Bologna, Parma, Milan, Innsbruck, Osnabrück, Paris and Warsaw. The collected data were sent to Florence at regular time intervals. In the 1660s Robert Hooke of the Royal Society of London sponsored networks of weather observers. Hippocrates's treatise Airs, Waters, and Places had linked weather to disease. Thus early meteorologists attempted to correlate weather patterns with epidemic outbreaks, and the climate with public health.

During the Age of Enlightenment meteorology tried to rationalise traditional weather lore, including astrological meteorology. But there were also attempts to establish a theoretical understanding of weather phenomena. Edmond Halley and George Hadley tried to explain trade winds. They reasoned that the rising mass of heated equator air is replaced by an inflow of cooler air from high latitudes. A flow of warm air at high altitude from equator to poles in turn established an early picture of circulation. Frustration with the lack of discipline among weather observers, and the poor quality of the instruments, led the early modern nation states to organise large observation networks. Thus, by the end of the 18th century, meteorologists had access to large quantities of reliable weather data. In 1832, an electromagnetic telegraph was created by Baron Schilling. The arrival of the electrical telegraph in 1837 afforded, for the first time, a practical method for quickly gathering surface weather observations from a wide area.

This data could be used to produce maps of the state of the atmosphere for a region near the Earth's surface and to study how these states evolved through time. To make frequent weather forecasts based on these data required a reliable network of observations, but it was not until 1849 that the Smithsonian Institution began to establish an observation network across the United States under the leadership of Joseph Henry. Similar observation networks were established in Europe at this time. The Reverend William Clement Ley was key in understanding of cirrus clouds and early understandings of jet streams. Charles Kenneth Mackinnon Douglas, known as 'CKM' Douglas, read Ley's papers after his death and carried on the early study of weather systems. 19th-century researchers in meteorology were drawn from military or medical backgrounds, rather than trained as dedicated scientists. In 1854, the United Kingdom government appointed Robert FitzRoy to the new office of Meteorological Statist to the Board of Trade with the task of gathering weather observations at sea. FitzRoy's office became the United Kingdom Meteorological Office in 1854, the second oldest national meteorological service in the world (the Central Institution for Meteorology and Geodynamics (ZAMG) in Austria was founded in 1851 and is the oldest weather service in the world). The first daily weather forecasts made by FitzRoy's Office were published in The Times newspaper in 1860. The following year a system was introduced of hoisting storm warning cones at principal ports when a gale was expected.

FitzRoy coined the term "weather forecast" and tried to separate scientific approaches from prophetic ones.

Over the next 50 years, many countries established national meteorological services. The India Meteorological Department (1875) was established to follow tropical cyclone and monsoon. The Finnish Meteorological Central Office (1881) was formed from part of Magnetic Observatory of Helsinki University. Japan's Tokyo Meteorological Observatory, the forerunner of the Japan Meteorological Agency, began constructing surface weather maps in 1883. The United States Weather Bureau (1890) was established under the United States Department of Agriculture. The Australian Bureau of Meteorology (1906) was established by a Meteorology Act to unify existing state meteorological services.

=== Numerical weather prediction ===
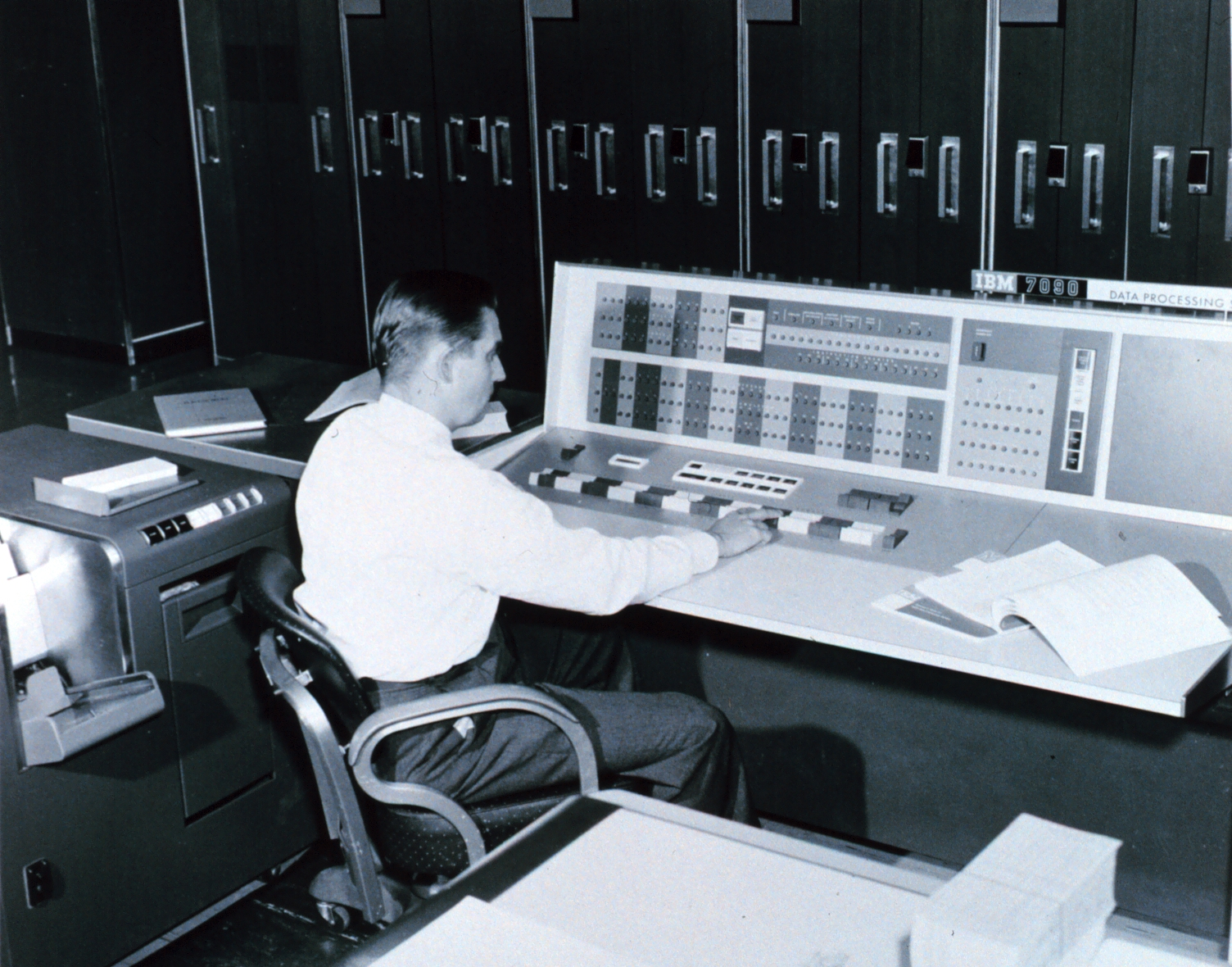
A meteorologist at the console of the IBM 7090 in the Joint Numerical Weather Prediction Unit, c. 1965

In 1904, Norwegian scientist Vilhelm Bjerknes first argued in his paper Weather Forecasting as a Problem in Mechanics and Physics that it should be possible to forecast weather from calculations based upon natural laws.

It was not until later in the 20th century that advances in the understanding of atmospheric physics led to the foundation of modern numerical weather prediction. In 1922, Lewis Fry Richardson published "Weather Prediction By Numerical Process", after finding notes and derivations he worked on as an ambulance driver in World War I. He described how small terms in the prognostic fluid dynamics equations that govern atmospheric flow could be neglected, and a numerical calculation scheme that could be devised to allow predictions. Richardson envisioned a large auditorium of thousands of people performing the calculations. However, the sheer number of calculations required was too large to complete without electronic computers, and the size of the grid and time steps used in the calculations led to unrealistic results. Though numerical analysis later found that this was due to numerical instability.

Starting in the 1950s, numerical forecasts with computers became feasible. The first weather forecasts derived this way used barotropic (single-vertical-level) models, and could successfully predict the large-scale movement of midlatitude Rossby waves, that is, the pattern of atmospheric lows and highs. In 1959, the UK Meteorological Office received its first computer, a Ferranti Mercury.

In the 1960s, the chaotic nature of the atmosphere was first observed and mathematically described by Edward Lorenz, founding the field of chaos theory. These advances have led to the current use of ensemble forecasting in most major forecasting centers, to take into account uncertainty arising from the chaotic nature of the atmosphere. Mathematical models used to predict the long term weather of the Earth (climate models), have been developed that have a resolution today that are as coarse as the older weather prediction models. These climate models are used to investigate long-term climate shifts, such as what effects might be caused by human emission of greenhouse gases.

== Meteorologists ==
Meteorologists are scientists who study and work in the field of meteorology. The American Meteorological Society publishes and continually updates an authoritative electronic Meteorology Glossary. Meteorologists work in government agencies, private consulting and research services, industrial enterprises, utilities, radio and television stations, and in education. In the United States, meteorologists held about 10,000 jobs in 2018.

Although weather forecasts and warnings are the best known products of meteorologists for the public, weather presenters on radio and television are not necessarily professional meteorologists. They are most often reporters with little formal meteorological training, using unregulated titles such as weather specialist or weatherman. The American Meteorological Society and National Weather Association issue "Seals of Approval" to weather broadcasters who meet certain requirements but this is not mandatory to be hired by the media.

== Equipment ==
Satellite image of Hurricane Hugo with a polar low visible at the top of the image

Each science has its own unique sets of laboratory equipment. In the atmosphere, there are many things or qualities of the atmosphere that can be measured. Rain, which can be observed, or seen anywhere and anytime was one of the first atmospheric qualities measured historically. Also, two other accurately measured qualities are wind and humidity. Neither of these can be seen but can be felt. The devices to measure these three sprang up in the mid-15th century and were respectively the rain gauge, the anemometer, and the hygrometer. Many attempts had been made prior to the 15th century to construct adequate equipment to measure the many atmospheric variables. Many were faulty in some way or were simply not reliable. Even Aristotle noted this in some of his work as the difficulty to measure the air.

Sets of surface measurements are important data to meteorologists. They give a snapshot of a variety of weather conditions at one single location and are usually at a weather station, a ship or a weather buoy. The measurements taken at a weather station can include any number of atmospheric observables. Usually, temperature, pressure, wind measurements, and humidity are the variables that are measured by a thermometer, barometer, anemometer, and hygrometer, respectively. Professional stations may also include air quality sensors (carbon monoxide, carbon dioxide, methane, ozone, dust, and smoke), ceilometer (cloud ceiling), falling precipitation sensor, flood sensor, lightning sensor, microphone (explosions, sonic booms, thunder), pyranometer/pyrheliometer/spectroradiometer (IR/Vis/UV photodiodes), rain gauge/snow gauge, scintillation counter (background radiation, fallout, radon), seismometer (earthquakes and tremors), transmissometer (visibility), and a GPS clock for data logging. Upper air data are of crucial importance for weather forecasting. The most widely used technique is launches of radiosondes. Supplementing the radiosondes a network of aircraft collection is organized by the World Meteorological Organization.

Remote sensing, as used in meteorology, is the concept of collecting data from remote weather events and subsequently producing weather information. The common types of remote sensing are Radar, Lidar, and satellites (or photogrammetry). Each collects data about the atmosphere from a remote location and, usually, stores the data where the instrument is located. Radar and Lidar are not passive because both use EM radiation to illuminate a specific portion of the atmosphere. Weather satellites along with more general-purpose Earth-observing satellites circling the earth at various altitudes have become an indispensable tool for studying a wide range of phenomena from forest fires to El Niño.

== Spatial scales ==
The study of the atmosphere can be divided into distinct areas that depend on both time and spatial scales. At one extreme of this scale is climatology. In the timescales of hours to days, meteorology separates into micro-, meso-, and synoptic scale meteorology. Respectively, the geospatial size of each of these three scales relates directly to the appropriate timescale.

Other subclassifications are used to describe the unique, local, or broad effects within those subclasses.

Scales of Atmospheric Motion Systems
Type of motion	Horizontal scale (meter)
Molecular mean free path	10^{−7}
Minute turbulent eddies	10^{−2} – 10^{−1}
Small eddies	10^{−1} – 1
Dust devils	1–10
Gusts	10 – 10^{2}
Tornadoes	10^{2}
Cumulonimbus clouds	10^{3}
Fronts, squall lines	10^{4} – 10^{5}
Hurricanes	10^{5}
Synoptic Cyclones	10^{6}
Planetary waves	10^{7}

=== Microscale ===
Microscale meteorology is the study of atmospheric phenomena on a scale of about 1 kilometre (0.62 mi) or less. Individual thunderstorms, clouds, and local turbulence caused by buildings and other obstacles (such as individual hills) are modeled on this scale. Misoscale meteorology is an informal subdivision.

=== Mesoscale ===
Mesoscale meteorology is the study of atmospheric phenomena that has horizontal scales ranging from 1 km to 1000 km and a vertical scale that starts at the Earth's surface and includes the atmospheric boundary layer, troposphere, tropopause, and the lower section of the stratosphere. The terms meso-alpha, meso-beta, and meso-gamma to classify the horizontal scales of atmospheric processes were introduced to the field of mesoscale meteorology by Isidoro Orlanski. Mesoscale timescales last from less than a day to multiple weeks. The events typically of interest are thunderstorms, squall lines, fronts, precipitation bands in tropical and extratropical cyclones, and topographically generated weather systems such as mountain waves and sea and land breezes.

=== Synoptic scale ===
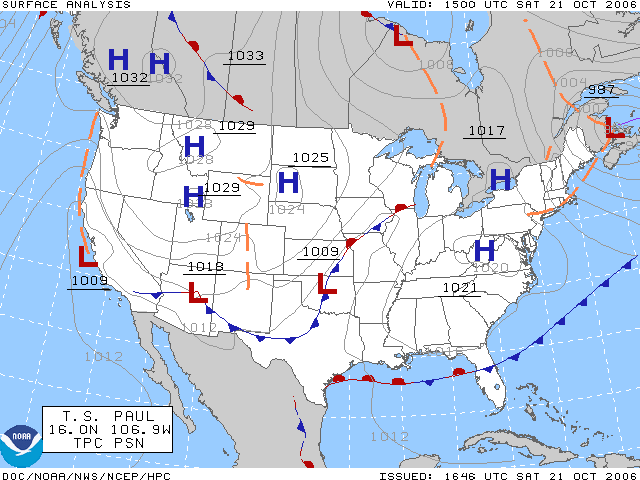
NOAA: Synoptic scale weather analysis

Synoptic scale meteorology predicts atmospheric changes at scales up to 1000 km and 10^{5} sec ~ (2.8 days), in time and space. At the synoptic scale, the Coriolis acceleration acting on moving air masses (outside of the tropics) plays a dominant role in predictions. The phenomena typically described by synoptic meteorology include events such as extratropical cyclones, baroclinic troughs and ridges, frontal zones, and to some extent jet streams. All of these are typically given on weather maps for a specific time. The minimum horizontal scale of synoptic phenomena is limited to the spacing between surface observation stations.

=== Global scale ===
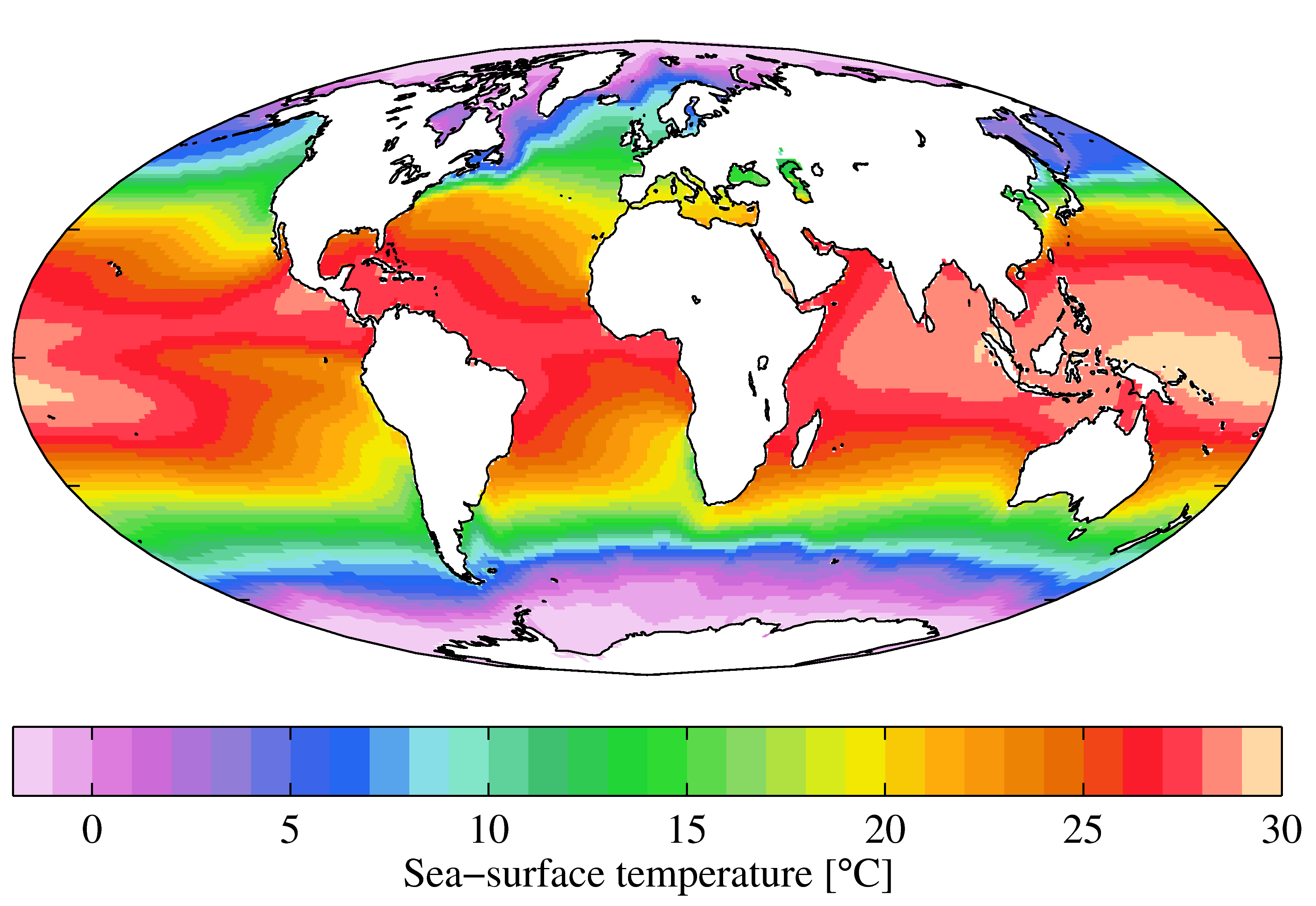
Annual mean sea surface temperatures

Global scale meteorology is the study of weather patterns related to the transport of heat from the tropics to the poles. Very large scale oscillations are of importance at this scale. These oscillations have time periods typically on the order of months, such as the Madden–Julian oscillation, or years, such as the El Niño–Southern Oscillation and the Pacific decadal oscillation. Global scale meteorology pushes into the range of climatology. The traditional definition of climate is pushed into larger timescales and with the understanding of the longer time scale global oscillations, their effect on climate and weather disturbances can be included in the synoptic and mesoscale timescales predictions.

Numerical Weather Prediction is a main focus in understanding air–sea interaction, tropical meteorology, atmospheric predictability, and tropospheric/stratospheric processes. The Naval Research Laboratory in Monterey, California, developed a global atmospheric model called Navy Operational Global Atmospheric Prediction System (NOGAPS). NOGAPS is run operationally at Fleet Numerical Meteorology and Oceanography Center for the United States Military. Many other global atmospheric models are run by national meteorological agencies.

== Branches of meteorology ==
=== Based on methodological approach ===
==== Physical meteorology ====
Physical meteorology studies the atmosphere's physical properties, processes, and phenomena. It covers the fundamental principles of atmospheric thermodynamics and energy transfer, including solar and terrestrial radiation (absorption, reflection, and scattering). Cloud physics is another key area of investigation, alongside the study of aerosols, precipitation formation, and atmospheric moist processes. The field further examines optical, electrical, and acoustical effects within the atmosphere. Near-surface processes like mixing, turbulence, and friction, and understanding their connection to the atmosphere's physical characteristics also fall within its scope.

==== Dynamic meteorology ====
Dynamic meteorology is the study of atmospheric motions and the physical laws that govern them, using principles drawn from fluid dynamics, thermodynamics and mechanical motion. It aims to explain why the atmosphere moves and how its state evolves. Here, the fundamental analytical unit of atmospheric behavior is an air parcel, defined as an infinitesimally small region in the fluid continuum of the atmosphere. This key conceptual tool allows for abstraction from the atmosphere's discrete molecular and chemical nature. Temperature, density, pressure, etc. are considered key physical quantities with unique values within this atmospheric continuum. These characterize the state of the atmosphere.

==== Synoptic meteorology ====
Synoptic meteorology focuses on diagnosing the conditions of the atmosphere at a given moment across large regions. This branch involves the preparation of various weather maps displaying meteorological conditions observed simultaneously (hence the term "synoptic," meaning "viewed together"). Examples of such maps include upper-air charts, aerological diagrams, and satellite imagery of cloud movement. Through detailed analysis of these charts, meteorologists aim to understand large-scale wind and pressure systems, as well as the complex relationship between atmospheric circulation and the regional surface environment. The primary objective of the field is to predict atmospheric changes from these initial conditions, typically for a few hours to a few days ahead. The ultimate goal is to help produce regional or station-based forecasts.

=== Based on scale ===
==== Boundary layer meteorology ====
Boundary layer meteorology is the study of processes in the air layer directly above Earth's surface, known as the atmospheric boundary layer (ABL). The effects of the surface – heating, cooling, and friction – cause turbulent mixing within the air layer. Significant movement of heat, matter, or momentum on time scales of less than a day are caused by turbulent motions. Boundary layer meteorology includes the study of all types of surface–atmosphere boundary, including ocean, lake, urban land and non-urban land for the study of meteorology.

== Applications ==
=== Weather forecasting ===
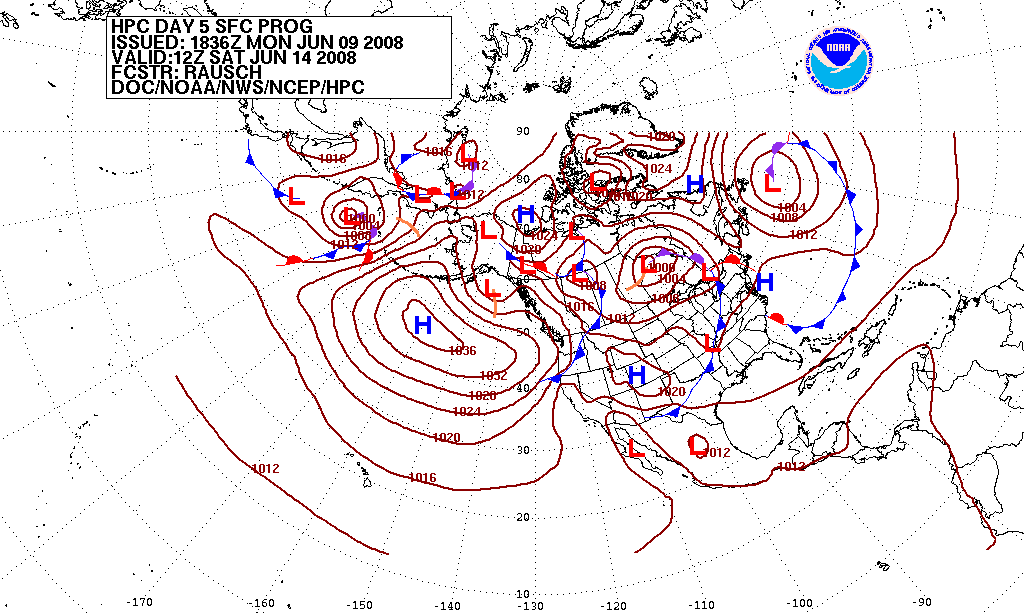
Forecast of surface pressures five days into the future for the north Pacific, North America, and north Atlantic Ocean

Weather forecasting is the application of science and technology to predict the state of the atmosphere at a future time and given location. Humans have attempted to predict the weather informally for millennia and formally since at least the 19th century. Weather forecasts are made by collecting quantitative data about the current state of the atmosphere and using scientific understanding of atmospheric processes to project how the atmosphere will evolve.

Once an all-human endeavor based mainly upon changes in barometric pressure, current weather conditions, and sky condition, forecast models are now used to determine future conditions. Human input is still required to pick the best possible forecast model to base the forecast upon, which involves pattern recognition skills, teleconnections, knowledge of model performance, and knowledge of model biases. The chaotic nature of the atmosphere, the massive computational power required to solve the equations that describe the atmosphere, error involved in measuring the initial conditions, and an incomplete understanding of atmospheric processes mean that forecasts become less accurate as the difference in current time and the time for which the forecast is being made (the range of the forecast) increases. The use of ensembles and model consensus help narrow the error and pick the most likely outcome.

There are a variety of end uses to weather forecasts. Weather warnings are important forecasts because they are used to protect life and property. Forecasts based on temperature and precipitation are important to agriculture, and therefore to commodity traders within stock markets. Temperature forecasts are used by utility companies to estimate demand over coming days. On an everyday basis, people use weather forecasts to determine what to wear. Since outdoor activities are severely curtailed by heavy rain, snow, and wind chill, forecasts can be used to plan activities around these events, and to plan ahead and survive them.

=== Aviation meteorology ===
Aviation meteorology deals with the impact of weather on air traffic management and flight operations. It is important for aircrews to understand meteorological conditions affecting flight planning and in-flight safety. Weather phenomena such as turbulence, icing, thunderstorms, and reduced visibility are major hazards to aviation and are included in standardized pilot training syllabi worldwide. In India, the Directorate General of Civil Aviation (DGCA) includes meteorology as a compulsory subject in pilot licensing examinations.

=== Agricultural meteorology ===
Meteorologists, soil scientists, agricultural hydrologists, and agronomists are people concerned with studying the effects of weather and climate on plant distribution, crop yield, water-use efficiency, phenology of plant and animal development, and the energy balance of managed and natural ecosystems. Conversely, they are interested in the role of vegetation on climate and weather.

=== Hydrometeorology ===
Hydrometeorology is the branch of meteorology that deals with the hydrologic cycle, the water budget, and the rainfall statistics of storms. A hydrometeorologist prepares and issues forecasts of accumulating (quantitative) precipitation, heavy rain, heavy snow, and highlights areas with the potential for flash flooding. Typically the range of knowledge that is required overlaps with climatology, mesoscale and synoptic meteorology, and other geosciences.

=== Nuclear meteorology ===
Nuclear meteorology investigates the distribution of radioactive aerosols and gases in the atmosphere.

=== Maritime meteorology ===
Maritime meteorology deals with air and wave forecasts for ships operating at sea. Organizations such as the Ocean Prediction Center, Honolulu National Weather Service forecast office, United Kingdom Met Office, KNMI and JMA prepare high seas forecasts for the world's oceans.

=== Military meteorology ===
Military meteorology is the research and application of meteorology for military purposes. In the United States, the United States Navy's Commander, Naval Meteorology and Oceanography Command oversees meteorological efforts for the Navy and Marine Corps while the United States Air Force's Air Force Weather Agency is responsible for the Air Force and Army.

=== Environmental meteorology ===
Environmental meteorology mainly analyzes industrial pollution dispersion physically and chemically based on meteorological parameters such as temperature, humidity, wind, and various weather conditions.

=== Renewable energy ===
Meteorology applications in renewable energy includes basic research, "exploration", and potential mapping of wind power and solar radiation for wind and solar energy.

== International cooperation ==
Weather is a global phenomenon that ignores national borders. To produce accurate weather forecasts, national meteorological services must share real-time observations to create a complete picture of the atmosphere. In 1950, the World Meteorological Organization was formed to facilitate the "free and unrestricted" exchange of data, information, and research between the respective meteorological and hydrological institutions of its members.

== See also ==
- American Practical Navigator
- Atmospheric circulation
- Atmospheric layers
- Atmospheric models
- Atmospheric pressure
- Atmospheric thermodynamics
- Automated airport weather station
- Cloud
- Eddy covariance flux (eddy correlation, eddy flux)
- El Niño–Southern Oscillation
- Index of meteorology articles
- Indigenous Australian seasons
- List of cloud types
- List of meteorology institutions
- List of Russian meteorologists
- List of weather instruments
- Madden–Julian oscillation
- Meteorological winter
- National Weatherperson's Day
- Precipitation
- ROFOR
- Space weather
- Walker circulation
- Weather station
