= Ocean Prediction Center =

One of the National Centers for Environmental Prediction's service centers

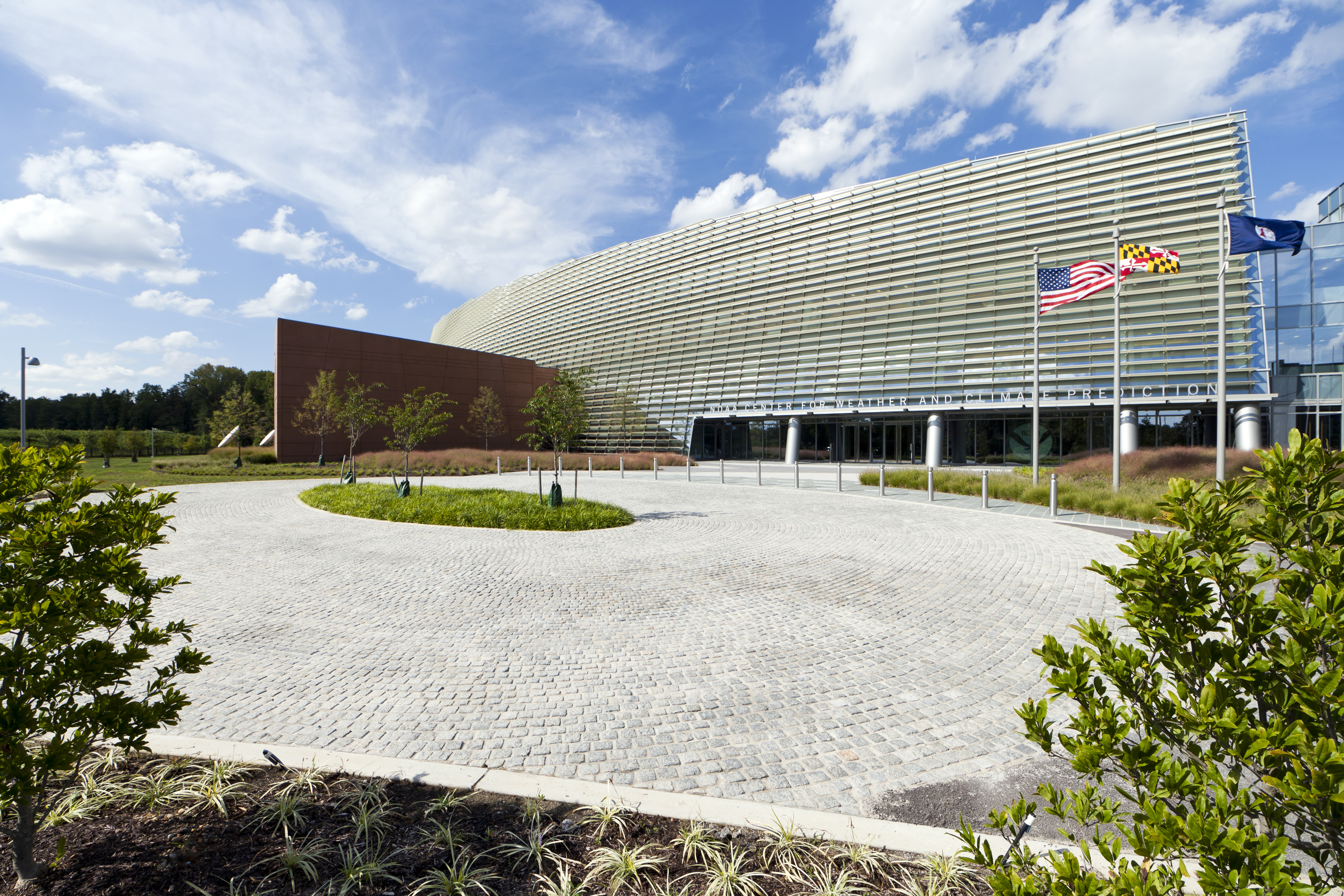

Agency overview
- Formed: 1995
- Jurisdiction: United States government
- Headquarters: College Park, MD
- Agency executives: A.J. Reiss, Director; Kathy Gilbert, Deputy Director
- Website: ocean.weather.gov

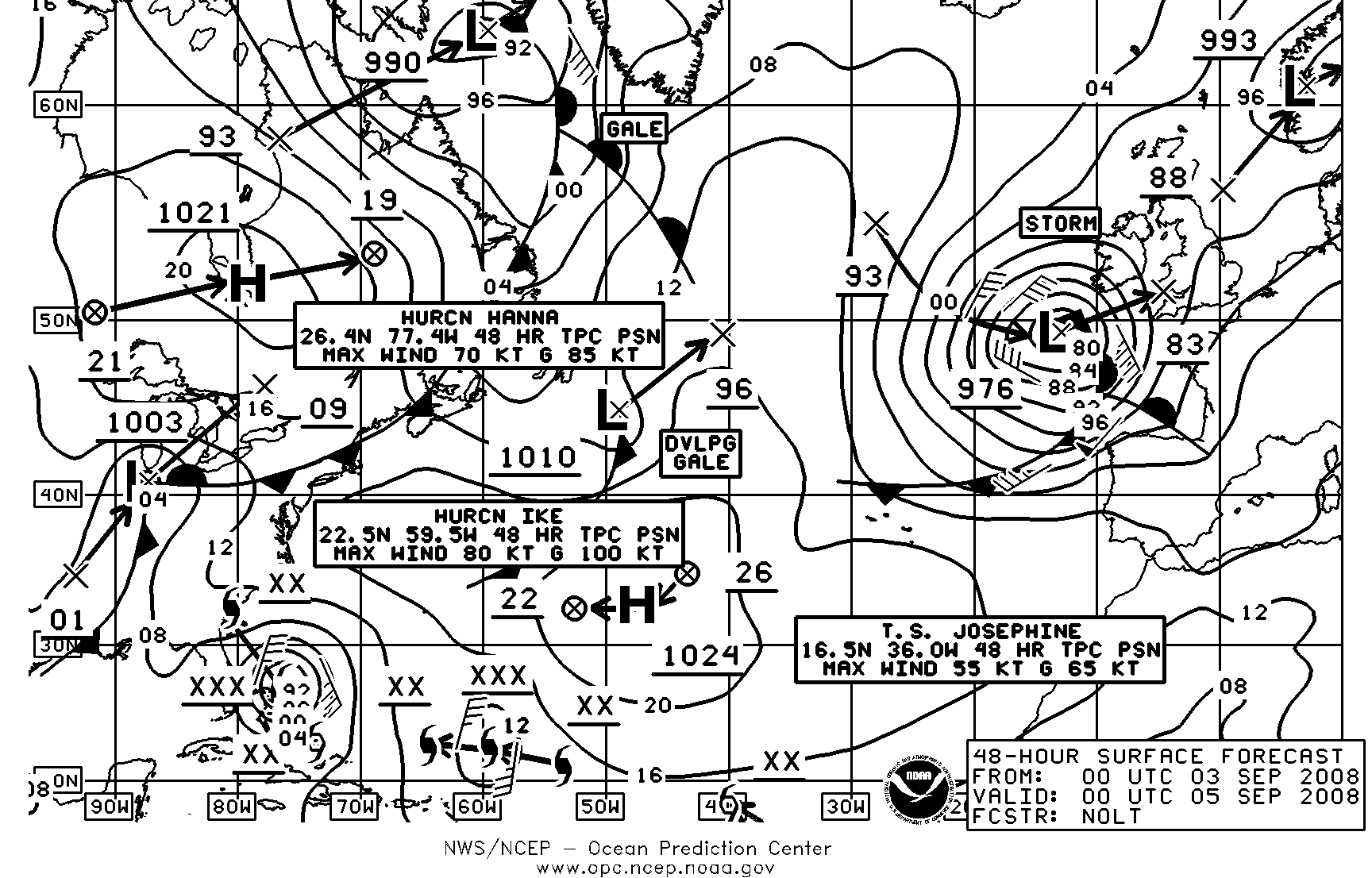
OPC pressure forecast valid at 48 hours

The Ocean Prediction Center (OPC), established in 1995, is one of the National Centers for Environmental Prediction's (NCEP's) original six service centers. Until 2003, the name of the organization was the Marine Prediction Center. Its origins are traced back to the sinking of the RMS Titanic in 1912. The OPC issues forecasts up to five days in advance for ocean areas north of 31° north latitude and west of 35° west longitude in the Atlantic, and across the northeast Pacific north of 30° north latitude and east of 160° east longitude. Until recently, the OPC provided forecast points for tropical cyclones north of 20° north latitude and east of the 60° west longitude to the National Hurricane Center. OPC is composed of two branches: the Ocean Forecast Branch and the Ocean Applications Branch.

== History ==
The first attempt as a marine weather program within the United States was initiated in New Orleans, Louisiana, by the United States Army Signal Corps. A January 23, 1873, memo directed the New Orleans Signal Observer to transcribe meteorological data from the ship logs of those arriving in port. Marine forecasting responsibility transferred from the United States Navy to the Weather Bureau in 1904, which enabled the receipt of timely observations from ships at sea. The basis for OPC's mission can be traced back to the sinking of the Titanic in April 1912. In response to that tragedy, an international commission was formed to determine requirements for safer ocean voyages. In 1914, the commission's work resulted in the International Convention for the Safety of Life at Sea, of which the United States is one of the original signatories.

In 1957, in order to help address marine issues, the United States Weather Bureau started to publish the Mariners Weather Log bi-monthly publication to report past weather conditions primarily over Northern Hemisphere oceans, information regarding the globe's tropical cyclone seasons, to publish monthly climatologies for use of those at sea, and to encourage voluntary ship observations from vessels at sea. From 1957 through 1966, the United States Weather Bureau's Office of Climatology published the Log. From 1966 through the summer of 1995, the Environmental Data Service, which became the National Environmental Satellite, Data, and Information Service, published the magazine.

Within the United States National Weather Service (NWS), forecast weather maps began to be published by offices in New York City, San Francisco, and Honolulu for public use. North Atlantic forecasts were shifted from a closed United States Navy endeavor to a National Weather Service product suite via radiofacsimile in 1971, while northeast Pacific forecasts became publicly available by the same method in 1972. Between 1986 and 1989, the portion of the National Meteorological Center (NMC) known as the Ocean Products Center (OPC) was responsible for marine weather forecasting guidance within the NWS. Between August 1989 and 1995, the unit named the Marine Forecast Branch also was involved in providing objective analysis and forecast products for marine and oceanographic variables.

When the National Centers for Environmental Prediction was created, the Marine Prediction Center (MPC) was organized to assume the U.S. obligation to issue warnings and forecasts for portions of the North Atlantic and North Pacific oceans. MPC was expected to be moved from Camp Springs, Maryland, to Monterey, California, but this did not occur. The Center was renamed the Ocean Prediction Center (OPC) on January 12, 2003.

== Products ==
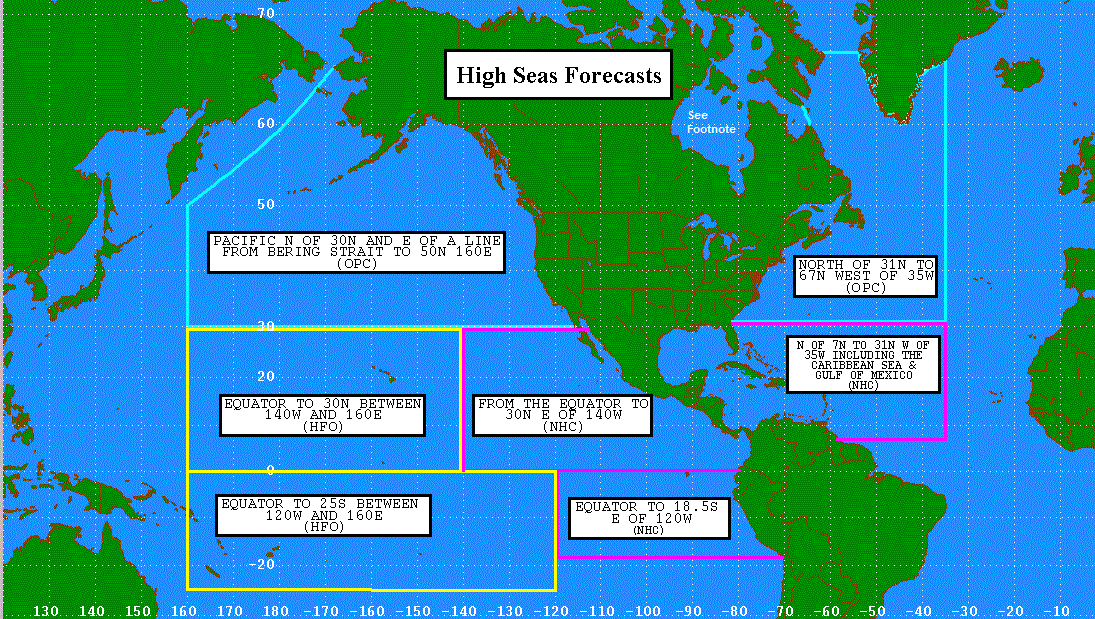
The National Weather Service areas of marine weather forecasting responsibility

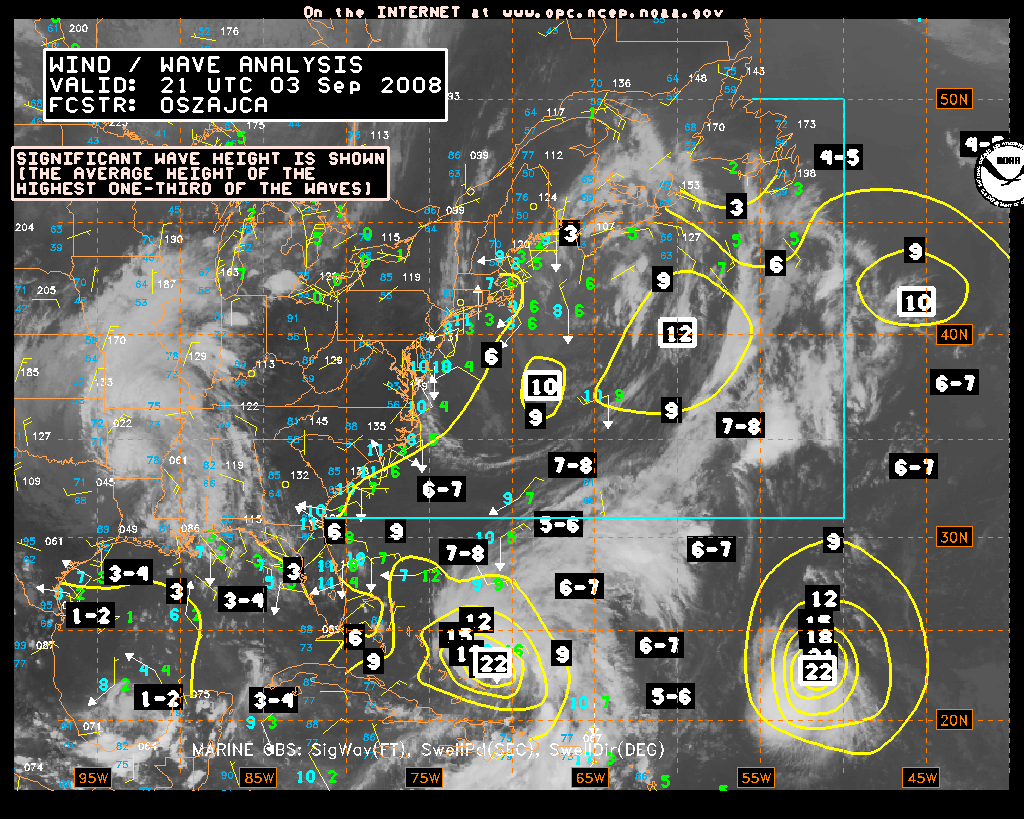
Wave height analysis from OPC

OPC's Ocean Forecast Branch issues warnings and forecasts in print and graphical formats for up five days into the future. Over 100 forecast products are issued daily. They cover the North Atlantic Ocean from the west coast of Europe to the U.S. and Canadian east coasts, and the North Pacific Ocean from the U.S. and Canadian west coast to the east coast of Asia. OPC weather forecasts and warnings for these areas primarily ensure the safety of ocean-crossing commercial ships and other vessels on the high seas. Embedded in these high seas areas are smaller offshore zones off the Atlantic and Pacific coasts. These zones extend from near the coast seaward to just beyond the U.S. Exclusive Economic Zones, out to about 250 nautical miles (460 km). OPC services ensure the safety of the extensive commercial and recreational fishing, boating, and shipping activities in these offshore waters.

OPC began to produce experimental gridded significant wave height forecasts in 2006, a first step toward digital marine service for high seas and offshore areas. Additional gridded products such as surface pressure and winds are under development. Recently, OPC began to use the NWS operational extratropical storm surge model output to provide experimental extratropical storm surge guidance for coastal weather forecast offices to assist them in coastal flood warning and forecast operations.

=== Role in the unified surface analysis ===
The OPC provides an important role in the production of the National Weather Service Unified Surface Analysis. After the Weather Prediction Center, or WPC, sends out their analysis for the synoptic hour, OPC cuts and stitches the WPC analysis to its area. The National Hurricane Center, or NHC, stitches the analysis from the Honolulu Forecast Office onto their map, before it is sent up to OPC. The OPC analysts then stitch together the entire analysis, and send it to the world through their website. The analysis covers much of the Northern Hemisphere, except for eastern Europe and the western half of Asia.

== Quality control of marine observations ==
In 1994, OPC began to quality control global surface marine observations. Using an automated algorithm and interactive system, forecasters examine the latest observations from voluntary observing ships and drifting and moored platforms and compare them against short-projection model runs. Worldwide surface marine observations come to OPC via the World Meteorological Organization's Global Telecommunications System in real time. These quality control measures remove spurious data before the data are ingested into models to initialize forecasts. Several hundred of these observations are interactively examined daily. In addition, the quality controlled data are used by OPC forecasters to determine if gale, storm, or hurricane-force wind warnings are warranted.

== Ocean Applications Branch ==
The Ocean Applications Branch plays an important role in enhancing OPC operations and services. One example is the adaptation of ocean surface winds observed from the QuikSCAT satellite in early 2000. Prior to the QuikSCAT launch, there was no ability to observe, verify, and warn of hurricane-force wind conditions, areas where wind speed exceeds 64 knots (119 km/h), often associated with strong winter ocean storms. With QuikSCAT data routinely available in 2000, OPC began to issue hurricane-force wind warnings. In the 2006-2007 winter storm season, over 100 hurricane-force wind warnings were issued for North Pacific and North Atlantic oceans to warn ships of these most severe weather hazard conditions over major shipping routes. Preliminary results from a recent study estimates that in the absence of good information about extra-tropical ocean storms, the annual loss to container and dry bulk shipping would be on the order of more than $500 million. Operational marine warnings and forecasts reduce the above estimated annual loss by nearly one half.

OPC has a number of ongoing research-to-operations transition efforts that will lead to a suite of new oceanographic analysis and forecast products, such as ocean temperatures and currents based on real time observations and advanced global and basin scale ocean forecasting models. Global ocean sea surface temperatures and currents are now available on the OPC website.

== See also ==
- Environmental Modeling Center
- MAFOR
- Shipping Forecast
- Space Weather Prediction Center
- Storm Prediction Center
