= Marine weather forecasting =

Forecasts of weather conditions at sea

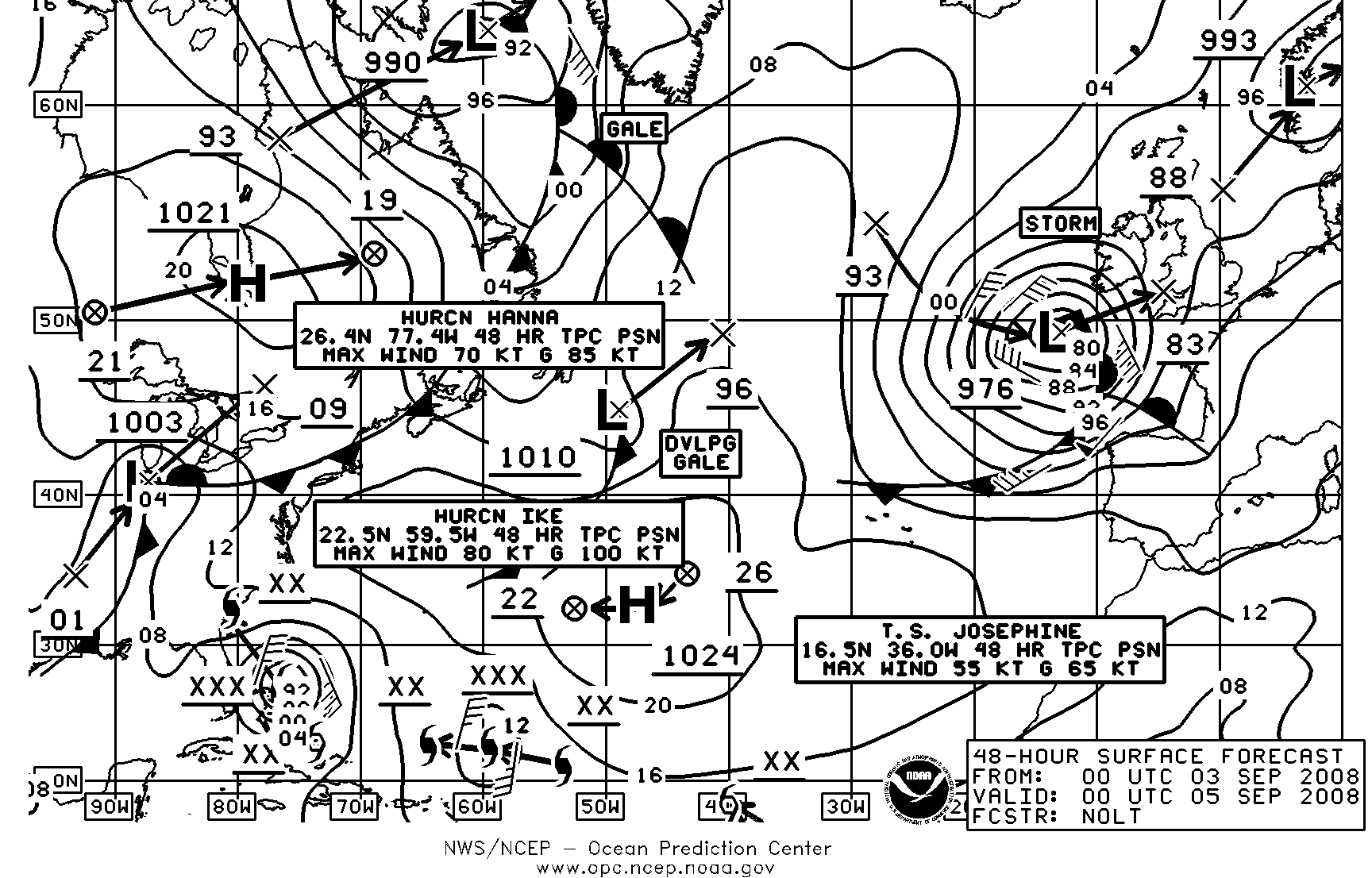
OPC pressure forecast valid at 48 hours

Marine weather forecasting is the process by which mariners and meteorological organizations attempt to forecast future weather conditions over the Earth's oceans. Mariners have had rules of thumb regarding navigation around tropical cyclones for many years, dividing a storm into halves and sailing through the normally weaker and more navigable half of their circulation. Marine weather forecasts by various weather organizations can be traced back to the sinking of the Royal Charter in 1859 and the RMS Titanic in 1912.

The wind is the driving force of weather at sea, as wind generates local wind waves, long ocean swells, and its flow around the subtropical ridge helps maintain warm water currents such as the Gulf Stream. The importance of weather over the ocean during World War II led to delayed or secret weather reports, in order to maintain a competitive advantage. Weather ships were established by various nations during World War II for forecasting purposes, and were maintained through 1985 to help with transoceanic plane navigation.

Voluntary observations from ships, weather buoys, weather satellites, and numerical weather prediction have been used to diagnose and help forecast weather over the Earth's ocean areas. Since the 1960s, numerical weather prediction's role over the Earth's seas has taken a greater role in the forecast process. Weather elements such as sea state, surface winds, tide levels, and sea surface temperature are tackled by organizations tasked with forecasting weather over open oceans and seas. Currently, the Japan Meteorological Agency, the United States National Weather Service, and the United Kingdom Met Office create marine weather forecasts for the Northern Hemisphere.

== History ==
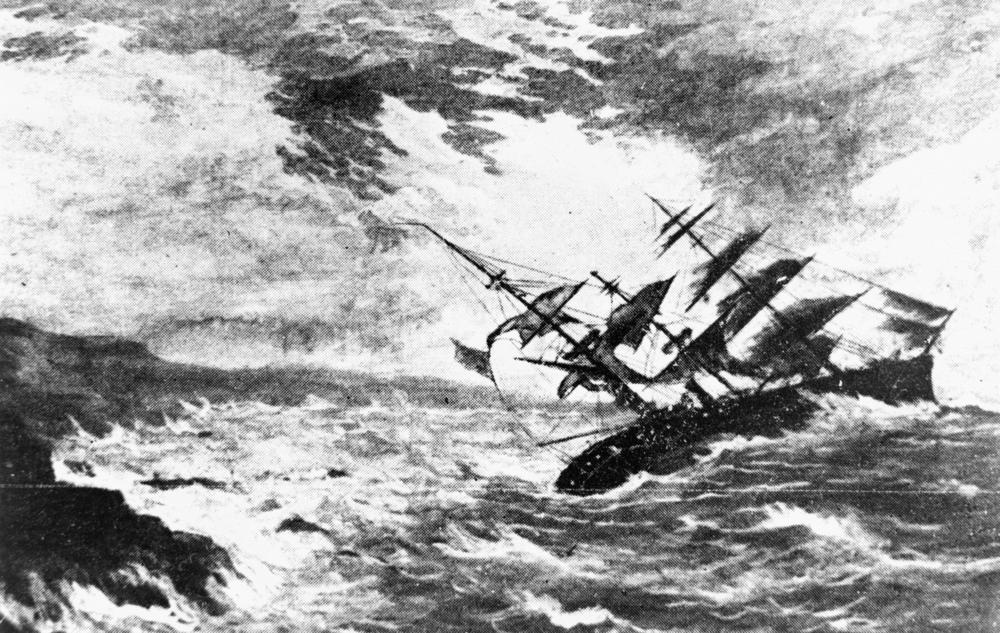
Royal Charter.

There are various origins for government-issued marine weather forecasts, generally following maritime disasters.

=== United Kingdom ===
In October 1859, the steam clipper Royal Charter was wrecked in a strong storm off Anglesey. 450 people lost their lives. Due to this loss, Vice-Admiral Robert FitzRoy introduced a warning service for shipping in February 1861, using telegraph communications. This remained the United Kingdom Met Office's primary responsibility for some time afterwards. In 1911, the Met Office had begun issuing marine weather forecasts which included gale and storm warnings via radio transmission for areas around the British Isles. This service was discontinued during and following World War I, between 1914 and June 1921, and again during World War II between 1939 and 1945.

=== United States ===
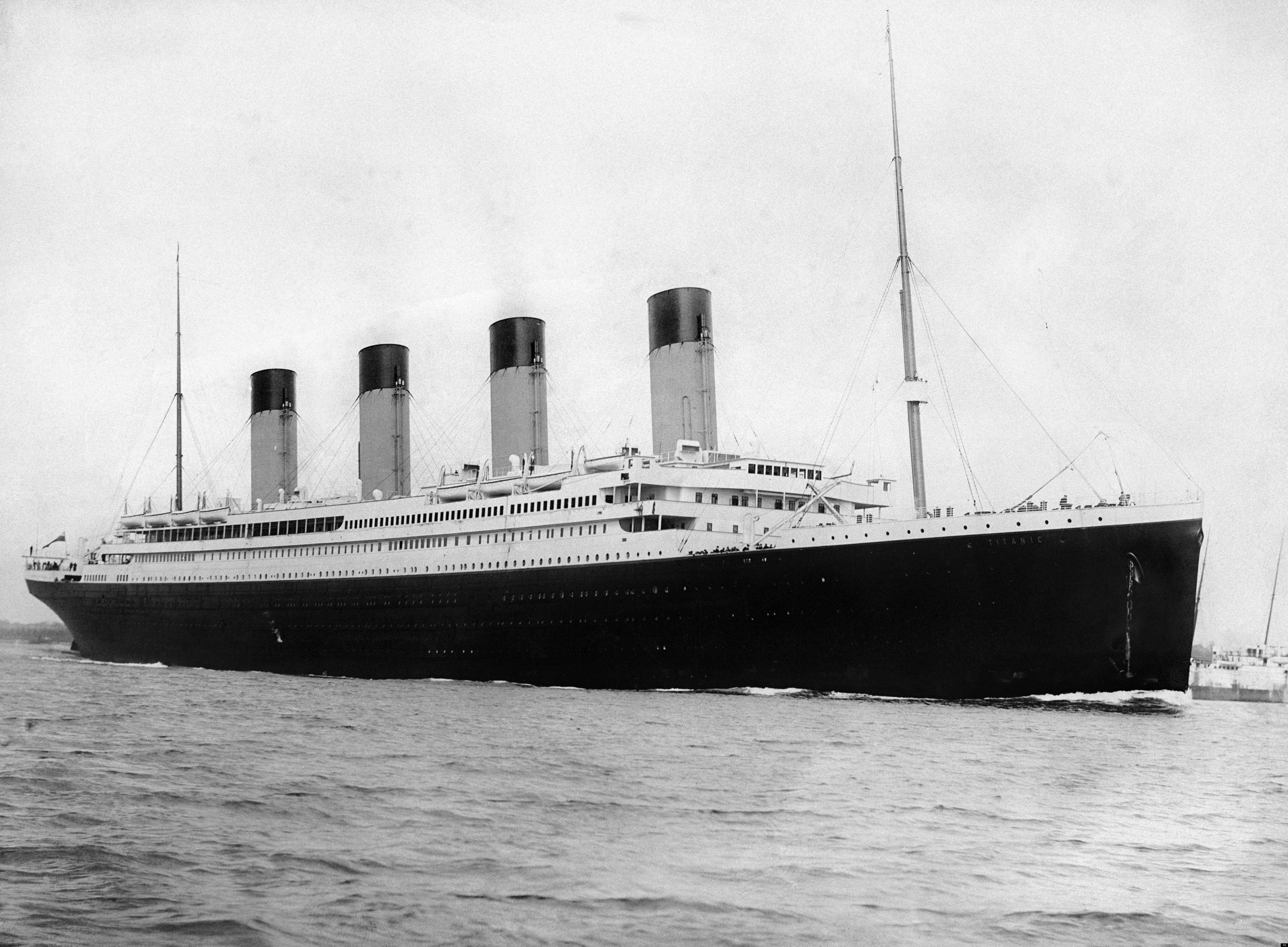
RMS Titanic departing Southampton on 10 April 1912

The first attempt as a marine weather program within the United States was initiated in New Orleans, Louisiana by the United States Army Signal Corps. A January 23, 1873 memo directed the New Orleans Signal Observer to transcribe meteorological data from the ship logs of those arriving in port. Marine forecasting responsibility transferred from the United States Navy to the Weather Bureau in 1904, which enabled the receipt of timely observations from ships at sea. The sinking of RMS Titanic in 1912 played a pivotal role in marine weather forecasting globally. In response to that tragedy, an international commission was formed to determine requirements for safer ocean voyages. In 1914, the commission's work resulted in the International Convention for the Safety of Life at Sea. In 1957, in order to help address marine issues, the United States Weather Bureau started to publish the Mariners Weather Log bi-monthly publication to report past weather conditions primarily over Northern Hemisphere oceans, information regarding the globe's tropical cyclone seasons, to publish monthly climatologies for use of those at sea, and to encourage voluntary ship observations from vessels at sea.

Within the United States National Weather Service (NWS), forecast weather maps began to be published by offices in New York City, San Francisco, and Honolulu for public use. North Atlantic forecasts were shifted from a closed United States Navy endeavor to a National Weather Service product suite via radiofacsimile in 1971, while northeast Pacific forecasts became publicly available by the same method in 1972. Between 1986 and 1989, the portion of the National Meteorological Center (NMC) known as the Ocean Products Center (OPC) was responsible for marine weather forecasting within the NWS. Between August 1989 and 1995, the unit named the Marine Forecast Branch also was involved in providing objective analysis and forecast products for marine and oceanographic variables. The Marine Prediction Center, later renamed the Ocean Prediction Center, assumed the U.S. obligation to issue warnings and forecasts for portions of the North Atlantic and North Pacific oceans once it was created in 1995.

== Importance of the wind ==
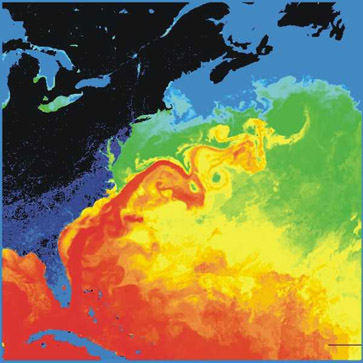
Surface temperature in the western North Atlantic, the Gulf Stream is in red

=== Development of warm ocean currents ===
The trade winds blow westward in the tropics, and the westerlies blow eastward at mid-latitudes. This wind pattern applies a stress to the subtropical ocean surface with negative curl across the north Atlantic Ocean. The resulting Sverdrup transport is equatorward. Because of conservation of potential vorticity caused by the poleward-moving winds on the subtropical ridge's western periphery and the increased relative vorticity of northward moving water, transport is balanced by a narrow, accelerating poleward current, which flows along the western boundary of the ocean basin, outweighing the effects of friction with the western boundary current known as the Labrador current. The conservation of potential vorticity also causes bends along the Gulf Stream, which occasionally break off due to a shift in the Gulf Stream's position, forming separate warm and cold eddies. This overall process, known as western intensification, causes currents on the western boundary of an ocean basin, such as the Gulf Stream, to be stronger than those on the eastern boundary.

=== Swell dispersion and wave groups ===
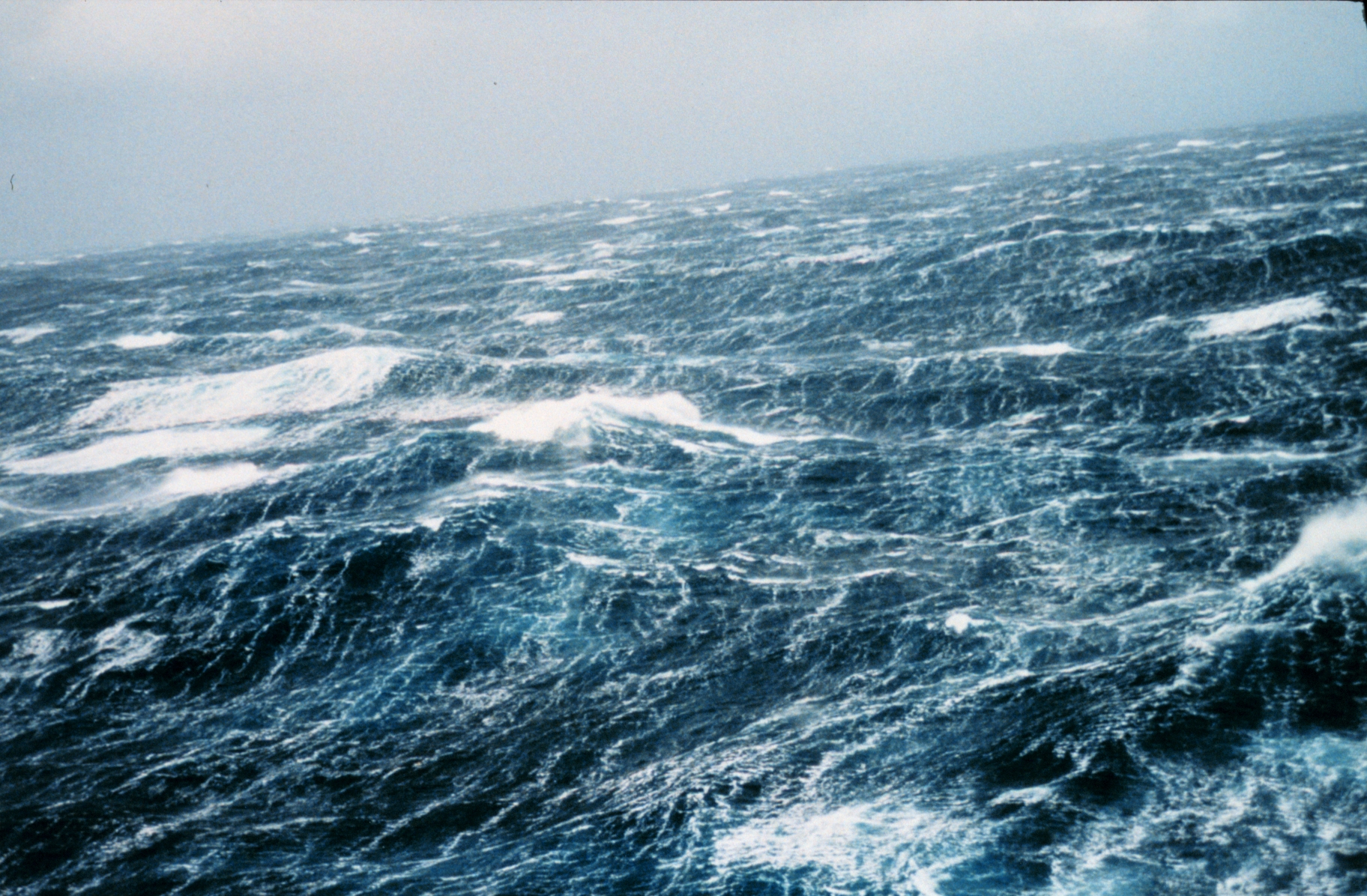
North Pacific storm waves as seen from the NOAA M/V Noble Star, Winter 1989.

Swells are often created by storms long distances away from the beach where they break, and the propagation of the longest swells is only limited by shorelines. For example, swells generated in the Indian Ocean have been recorded in California after more than half a round-the-world trip. This distance allows the waves comprising the swells to be better sorted and free of chop as they travel toward the coast. Waves generated by storm winds have the same speed and will group together and travel with each other, while others moving at even a fraction of a metre per second slower will lag behind, ultimately arriving many hours later due to the distance covered. The time of propagation from the source t is proportional to the distance X divided by the wave period T. In deep water it is $t = 4 \pi X /( g T)$ where g is the acceleration of gravity. As an example, for a storm located 10,000 kilometres (6,200 mi) away, swells with a period T=15 s will arrive 10 days after the storm, followed by 14 s swells another 17 hours later.

This dispersive arrivals of swells, long periods first with a reduction in the peak wave period over time, can be used to tell the distance at which swells were generated. Whereas the sea state in the storm has a frequency spectrum with more or less always the same shape (i.e. a well defined peak with dominant frequencies within plus or minus 7% of the peak), the swell spectra are more and more narrow, sometimes as 2% or less, as waves disperse further and further away. The result is that wave groups (called sets by surfers) can have a large number of waves. From about seven waves per group in the storm, this rises to 20 and more in swells from very distant storms.

=== Sailing ship journeys ===
Ocean journeys by sailing ship can take many months, and a common hazard is becoming becalmed because of lack of wind, or being blown off course by severe storms or winds that do not allow progress in the desired direction. A severe storm could lead to shipwreck, and the loss of all hands. Sailing ships can only carry a certain quantity of supplies in their hold, so they have to plan long voyages carefully to include appropriate provisions, including fresh water.

== Tropical cyclone avoidance ==
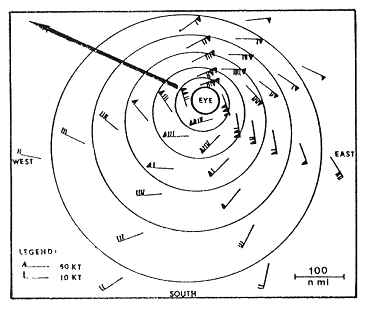
The dangerous semicircle is the upper-right corner, with the arrow marking the direction of motion of a Northern Hemisphere storm.

Mariners have a way to safely navigate around tropical cyclones. They split tropical cyclones in two, based on their direction of motion, and maneuver to avoid the right segment of the cyclone in the Northern Hemisphere (the left in the Southern Hemisphere). Sailors term the right side the dangerous semicircle since the heaviest rain and strongest winds and seas were located in this half of the storm, as the cyclone's translation speed and its rotational wind are additive. The other half of the tropical cyclone is called the navigable semicircle since weather conditions are lessened (subtractive) in this portion of the storm. The rules of thumb for ship travel when a tropical cyclone is in their vicinity are to avoid them if at all possible and do not cross their forecast path (crossing the T). Those traveling through the dangerous semicircle are advised to keep to the true wind on the starboard bow and make as much headway as possible. Ships moving through the navigable semicircle are advised to keep the true wind on the starboard quarter while making as much headway as possible.

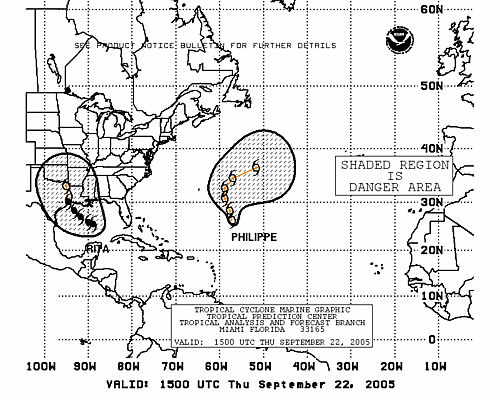
Hurricanes Rita and Philippe shown with 1-2-3 rule predictions.

The 1-2-3 rule (mariners' 1-2-3 rule or danger area) is a guideline commonly taught to mariners for severe storm (specifically hurricane and tropical storm) tracking and prediction. It refers to the rounded long-term National Hurricane Center forecast errors of 100-200-300 nautical miles at 24-48-72 hours, respectively. However, these errors have decreased to near 50-100-150 as NHC forecasters become more accurate with tropical cyclone track forecasting. The "danger area" to be avoided is constructed by expanding the forecast path by a radius equal to the respective hundreds of miles plus the forecast wind radii (size of the storm at those hours).

== Within numerical weather prediction ==
=== Ocean surface modeling ===
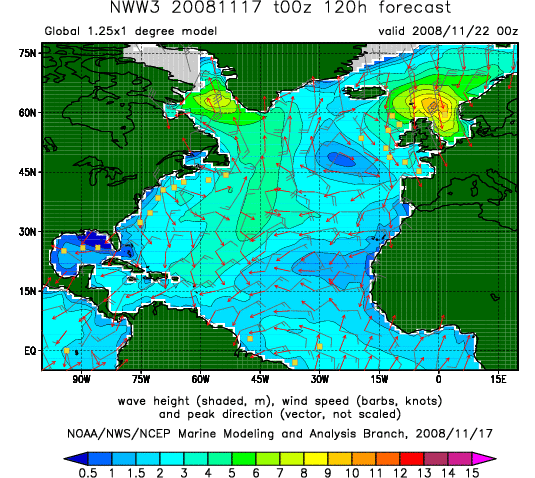
NOAA Wavewatch III 120-hour wind and wave forecast for the North Atlantic

The transfer of energy between the wind blowing over the surface of an ocean and the ocean's upper layer is an important element in wave dynamics. The spectral wave transport equation is used to describe the change in wave spectrum over changing topography. It simulates wave generation, wave movement (propagation within a fluid), wave shoaling, refraction, energy transfer between waves, and wave dissipation. Since surface winds are the primary forcing mechanism in the spectral wave transport equation, ocean wave models use information produced by numerical weather prediction models as inputs to determine how much energy is transferred from the atmosphere into the layer at the surface of the ocean. Along with dissipation of energy through whitecaps and resonance between waves, surface winds from numerical weather models allow for more accurate predictions of the state of the sea surface.

The first ocean wave models were developed in the 1960s and 1970s. These models had the tendency to overestimate the role of wind in wave development and underplayed wave interactions. A lack of knowledge concerning how waves interacted among each other, assumptions regarding a maximum wave height, and deficiencies in computer power limited the performance of the models. After experiments were performed in 1968, 1969, and 1973, wind input from the Earth's atmosphere was weighted more accurately in the predictions. A second generation of models was developed in the 1980s, but they could not realistically model swell nor depict wind-driven waves (also known as wind waves) caused by rapidly changing wind fields, such as those within tropical cyclones. This caused the development of a third generation of wave models from 1988 onward.

Within this third generation of models, the spectral wave transport equation is used to describe the change in wave spectrum over changing topography. It simulates wave generation, wave movement (propagation within a fluid), wave shoaling, refraction, energy transfer between waves, and wave dissipation. Since surface winds are the primary forcing mechanism in the spectral wave transport equation, ocean wave models use information produced by numerical weather prediction models as inputs to determine how much energy is transferred from the atmosphere into the layer at the surface of the ocean. Along with dissipation of energy through whitecaps and resonance between waves, surface winds from numerical weather models allow for more accurate predictions of the state of the sea surface.

== Observing platforms ==
=== Weather ships ===
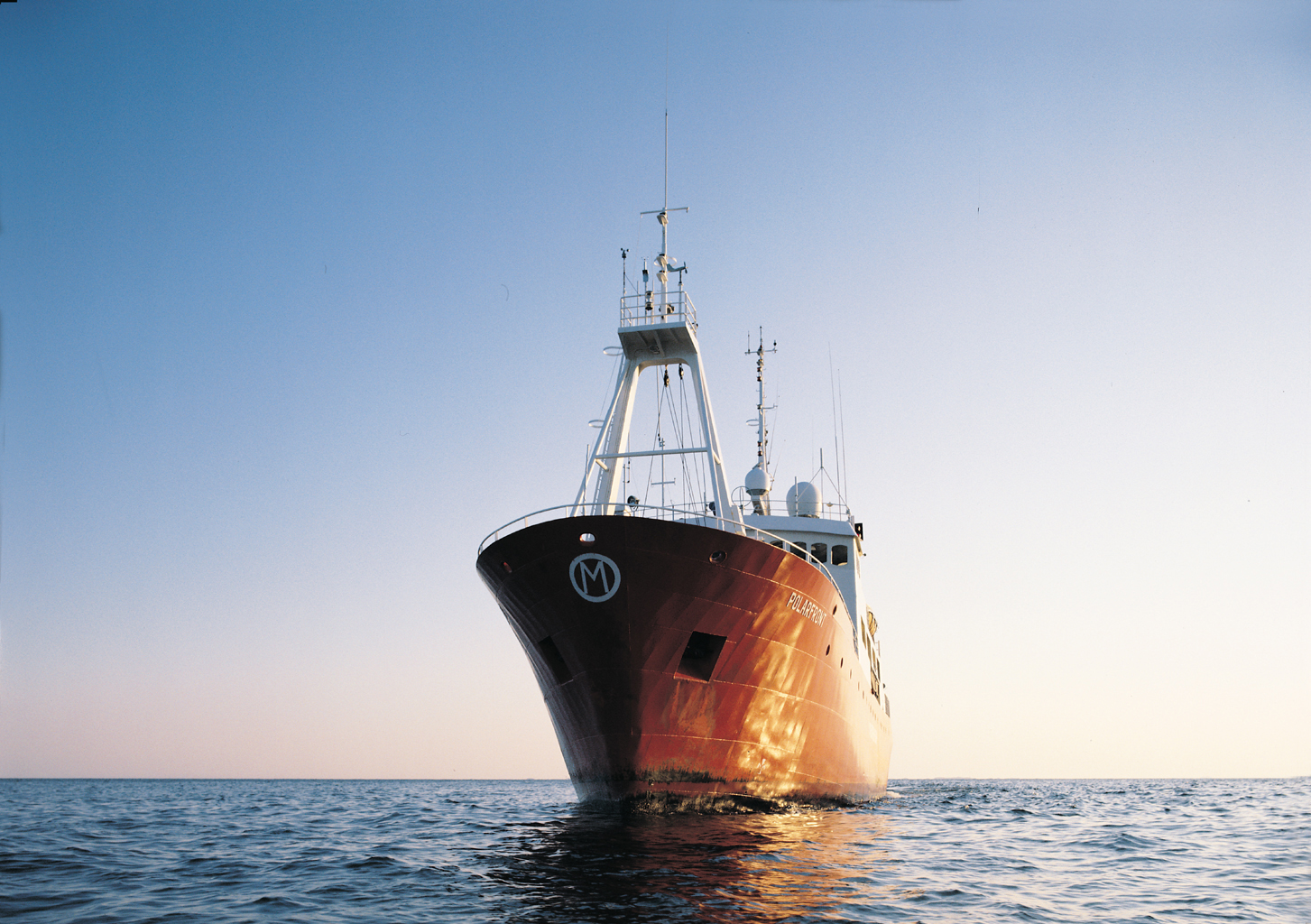
The weather ship MS Polarfront at sea.

The idea of a stationary weather ship was proposed as early as 1921 by Météo-France to help support shipping and the coming of transatlantic aviation. Established during World War II, a weather ship, or ocean weather vessel, was a ship stationed in the ocean as a platform for surface and upper air meteorological observations for use in weather forecasting. They were used during World War II but had no means of defense, which led to the loss of several ships and many lives. They were primarily located in the north Atlantic and north Pacific oceans, reporting via radio. In addition to their weather reporting function, these vessels aided in search and rescue operations, supported transatlantic flights, acted as research platforms for oceanographers, monitored marine pollution, and aided weather forecasting both by weather forecasters and within computerized atmospheric models. Research vessels remain heavily used in oceanography, including physical oceanography and the integration of meteorological and climatological data in Earth system science.

The establishment of weather ships proved to be so useful during World War II that the International Civil Aviation Organization (ICAO) had established a global network of 13 weather ships by 1948, with seven operated by the United States, one operated jointly by the United States and Canada, two supplied by the United Kingdom, one maintained by France, one a joint venture by the Netherlands and Belgium, and one shared by the United Kingdom, Norway, and Sweden. This number was eventually negotiated down to nine. The agreement of the use of weather ships by the international community ended in 1985.

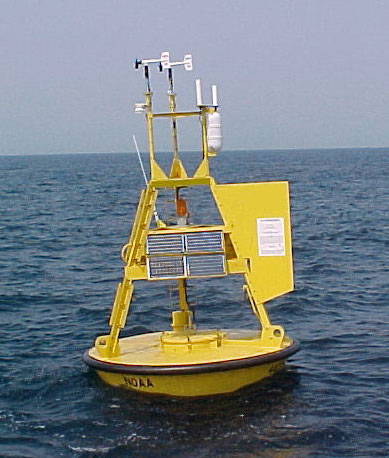
Weather buoy operated by the NOAA National Data Buoy Center

=== Weather buoys ===
Weather buoys are instruments which collect weather and ocean data within the world's oceans, as well as aid during emergency response to chemical spills, legal proceedings, and engineering design. Moored buoys have been in use since 1951, while drifting buoys have been used since 1972. Moored buoys are connected with the ocean bottom using either chains, nylon, or buoyant polypropylene. With the decline of the weather ship, they have taken a more primary role in measuring conditions over the open seas since the 1970s. During the 1980s and 1990s, a network of buoys in the central and eastern tropical Pacific Ocean helped study the El Niño-Southern Oscillation. Moored weather buoys range from 1.5 metres (4.9 ft) to 12 metres (39 ft) in diameter, while drifting buoys are smaller, with diameters of 30 centimetres (12 in) to 40 centimetres (16 in). Drifting buoys are the dominant form of weather buoy in sheer number, with 1250 located worldwide. Wind data from buoys has smaller error than that from ships. There are differences in the values of sea surface temperature measurements between the two platforms as well, relating to the depth of the measurement and whether or not the water is heated by the ship which measures the quantity.

=== Weather satellites ===
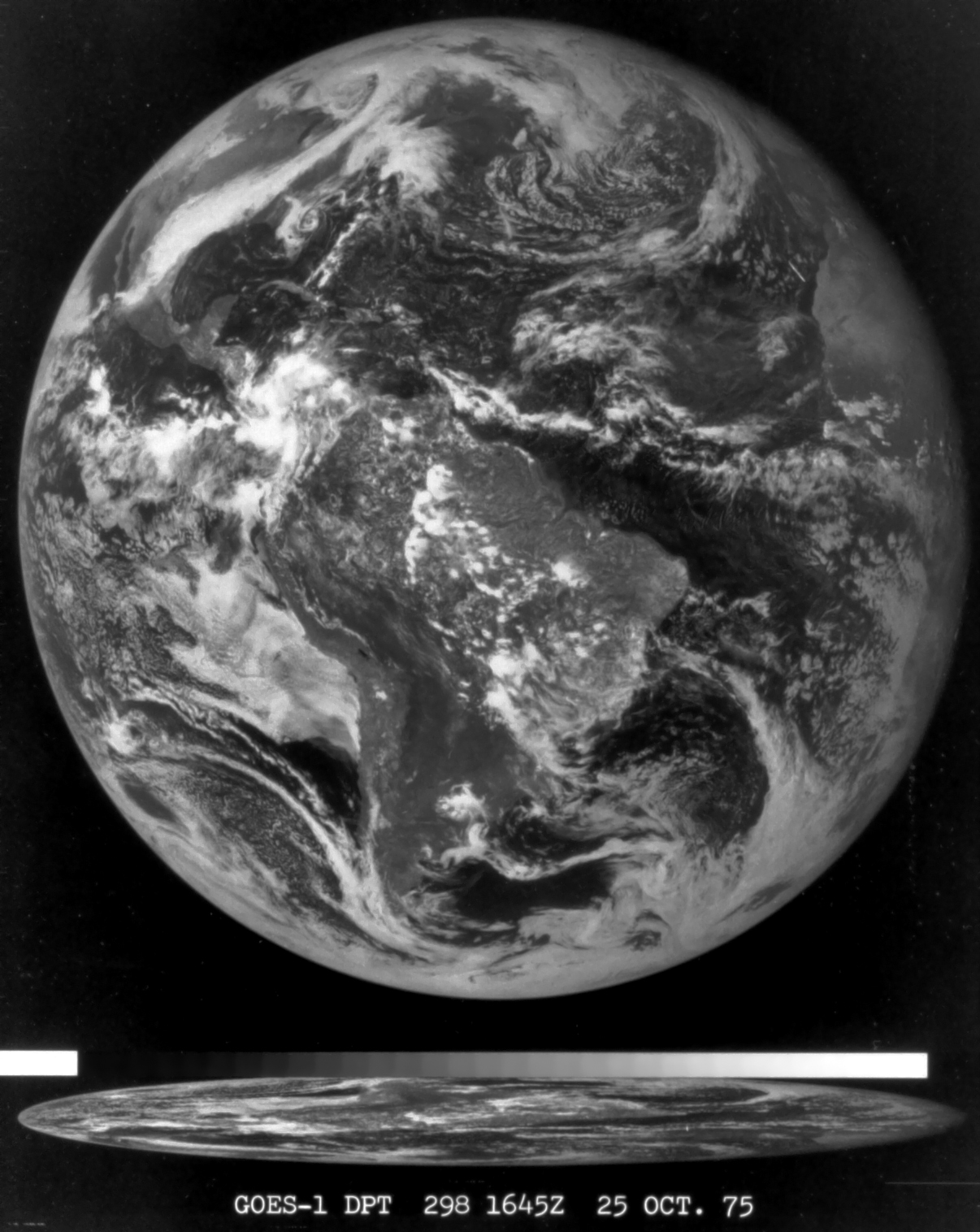
The first image obtained from the GOES 1 satellite, 1975 October 25, 1645 GMT.

In use since 1960, the weather satellite is a type of satellite that is primarily used to monitor the weather and climate of the Earth. Satellites can be polar orbiting, covering the entire Earth asynchronously, or geostationary, hovering over the same spot on the equator. Meteorological satellites see more than clouds and cloud systems. Beginning with the Nimbus 3 satellite in 1969, temperature information through the atmospheric column began to be retrieved by satellites from the eastern Atlantic and most of the Pacific Ocean, which led to significant forecast improvements. City lights, fires, effects of pollution, auroras, sand and dust storms, snow cover, ice mapping, boundaries of ocean currents, energy flows, etc., and other types of environmental information are collected using weather satellites. Other environmental satellites can detect changes in the Earth's vegetation, sea state, ocean color, and ice fields. El Niño and its effects on weather are monitored daily from satellite images. Collectively, weather satellites flown by the U.S., Europe, India, China, Russia, and Japan provide nearly continuous observations for a global weather watch.

== Utility ==
Commercial and recreational use of waterways can be limited significantly by wind direction and speed, wave periodicity and heights, tides, and precipitation. These factors can each influence the safety of marine transit. Consequently, a variety of codes have been established to efficiently transmit detailed marine weather forecasts to vessel pilots via radio, for example the MAFOR (marine forecast). Typical weather forecasts can be received at sea through the use of RTTY, Navtex and Radiofax.

== NCEP Products available ==
Marine weather warnings and forecasts in print and prognostic chart formats are produced for up five days into the future. Forecasts in printed form include the High Seas Forecast, Offshore Marine Forecasts, and Coastal Waters Forecasts. To help shorten the length of the forecast products, single words and phrases are used to describe areas out at sea. Experimental gridded significant wave height forecasts began being produced by the Ocean Prediction Center in 2006, a first step toward digital marine service for high seas and offshore areas. Additional gridded products such as surface pressure and winds are under development. Recently, National Weather Service operational extratropical storm surge model output to provide experimental extratropical storm surge guidance for coastal weather forecast offices to assist them in coastal flood warning and forecast operations.

== Responsible organizations and their areas ==
=== Northern Hemisphere ===
Within the Japan Meteorological Agency, marine observatories are seated in Hakodate, Maizuru, Kobe and Nagasaki. These stations observe ocean waves, tide levels, sea surface temperature and ocean current etc. in the Northwestern Pacific basin, as well as the Sea of Japan and the Sea of Okhotsk basin, and provide marine meteorological forecasts resulted from them, in cooperation with the Hydrographic and Oceanographic Department, Japan Coast Guard.

Within the United Kingdom, the Shipping Forecast is a BBC Radio broadcast of weather reports and forecasts for the seas around the coasts of the British Isles. It is produced by the Met Office and broadcast four times per day by BBC Radio 4 on behalf of the Maritime and Coastguard Agency. The forecasts sent over the Navtex system use a similar format and the same sea areas. The waters around the British Isles are divided into sea areas, also known as weather areas.

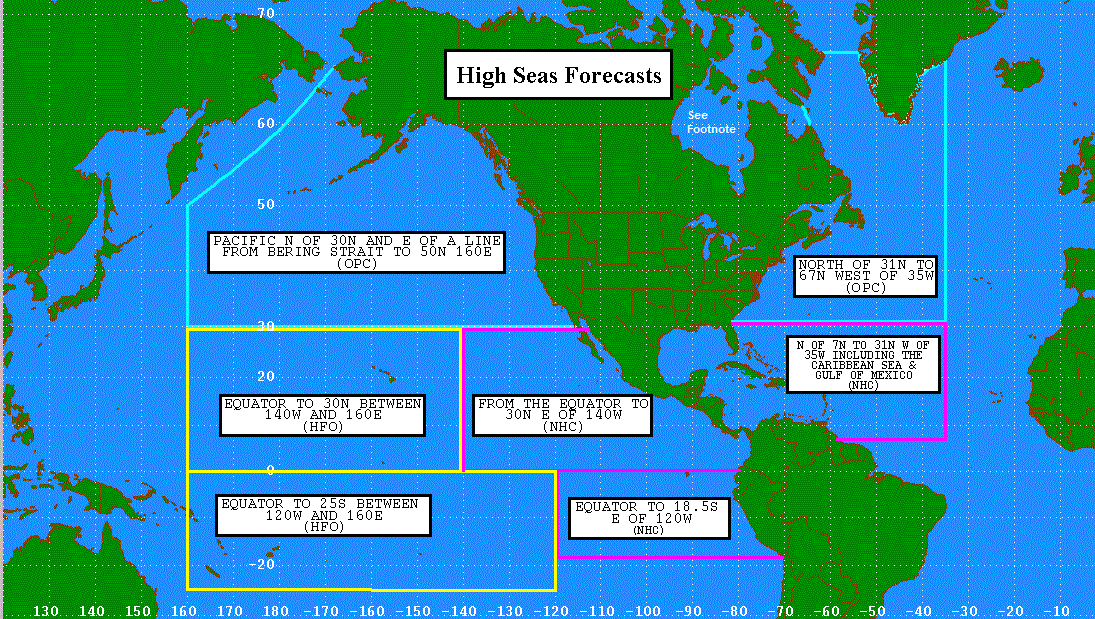
The National Weather Service areas of marine weather forecasting responsibility

Within the United States National Weather Service, the Ocean Prediction Center (OPC), established in 1995, is one of the National Centers for Environmental Prediction’s (NCEP's) original six service centers. Until January 12, 2003, the name of the organization was the Marine Prediction Center. The OPC issues forecasts up to five days in advance for ocean areas north of 31 north latitude and west of 35 west longitude in the Atlantic, and across the northeast Pacific north of 30 north latitude and east of 160 east longitude. Until recently, the OPC provided forecast points for tropical cyclones north of 20 north latitude and east of the 60 west longitude to the National Hurricane Center. OPC is composed of two branches: the Ocean Forecast Branch and the Ocean Applications Branch. The National Hurricane Center covers marine areas south of the 31st parallel in the Atlantic and 30th parallel in the Pacific between the 35th meridian west and 140th meridian west longitude. The Honolulu Weather Service Forecast Office forecasts within the area between the 140th meridian west and the 160th meridian east, from the 30th parallel north down to equator.

=== Southern Hemisphere ===
The National Hurricane Center's area of responsibility includes Southern Hemisphere areas in the Pacific down to 18.5 degrees south eastward of the 120th meridian west. South of the equation, the NWS Honolulu Forecast Office forecasts southward to the 25th parallel south between the 160th meridian east and the 120th meridian west.
