= William Clement Ley =

English clergyman and meteorologist

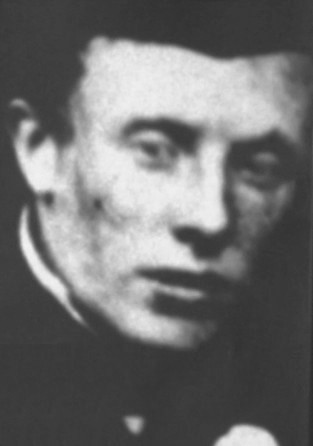
William Clement Ley

William Clement Ley (6 July 1840 - 22 April 1896) was an English clergyman and pioneer meteorologist who studied clouds and examined their dynamics and use in weather forecasting.

== Life ==
Ley was born in Bristol to William Henry Ley who was a headmaster at Hereford Cathedral School. He studied classics at Magdalen College in Oxford and graduated with a BA First Class in 1862 and an MA in 1864. He took an interest in meteorology and became Vice President of the University Meteorological Society.

Ley was ordained in 1863 serving in Herefordshire before becoming rector of Ashby Parva, Leicestershire in 1874. In 1873 he was elected a Fellow of the Meterorological Society and published a number of researches in the Quarterly Journal of the Royal Meteorological Society.

Ley's major contribution was his book on the clouds titled Cloudland: A study on the structure and characters of clouds (1894). He examined how cloud formations were related to the weather and examined the value of cloud observation in forecasting weather. He was possibly the first to examine upper air circulations and their relation to air flow in lower altitudes. He studied cirrus drifts and examined what are now termed as jet streams.

He married Elizabeth in 1866 and they had eight children. He resigned from his clerical position in 1892 and died in 1896, two years after the death of his wife.

His work was largely ignored until his ideas were rediscovered 40 years later.

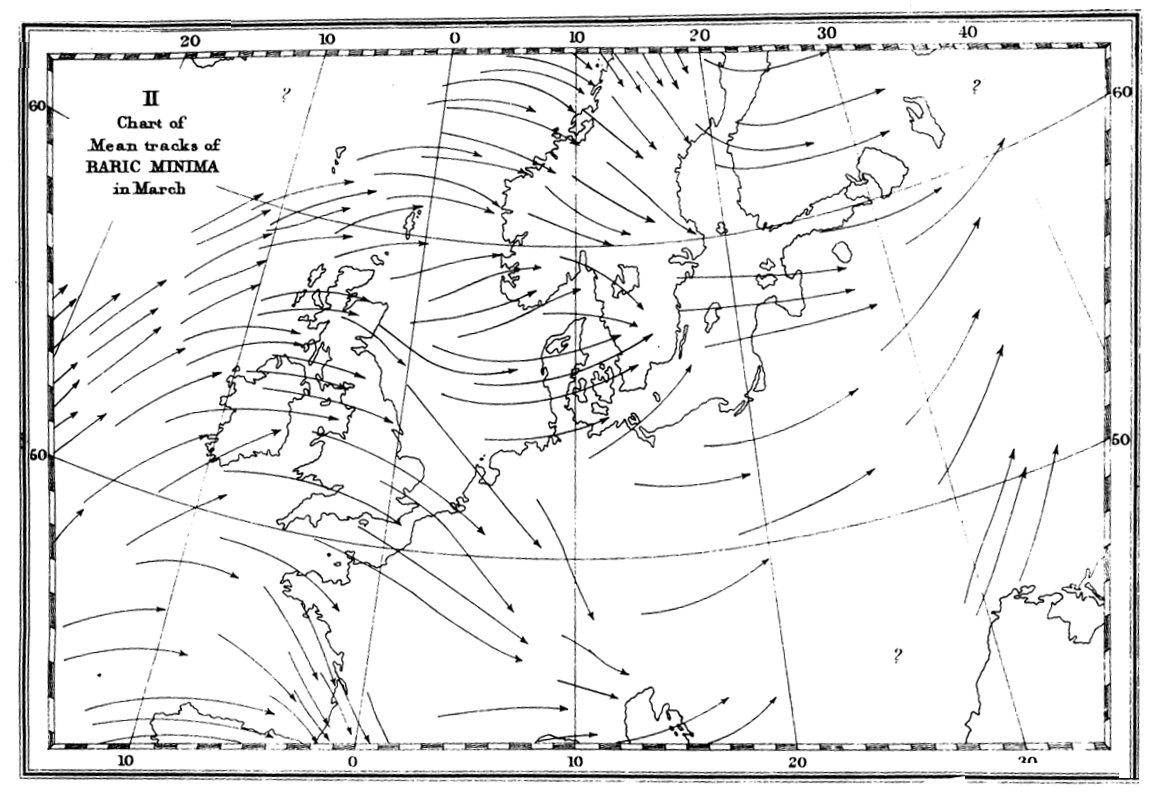
Chart of winds in Europe, 1872

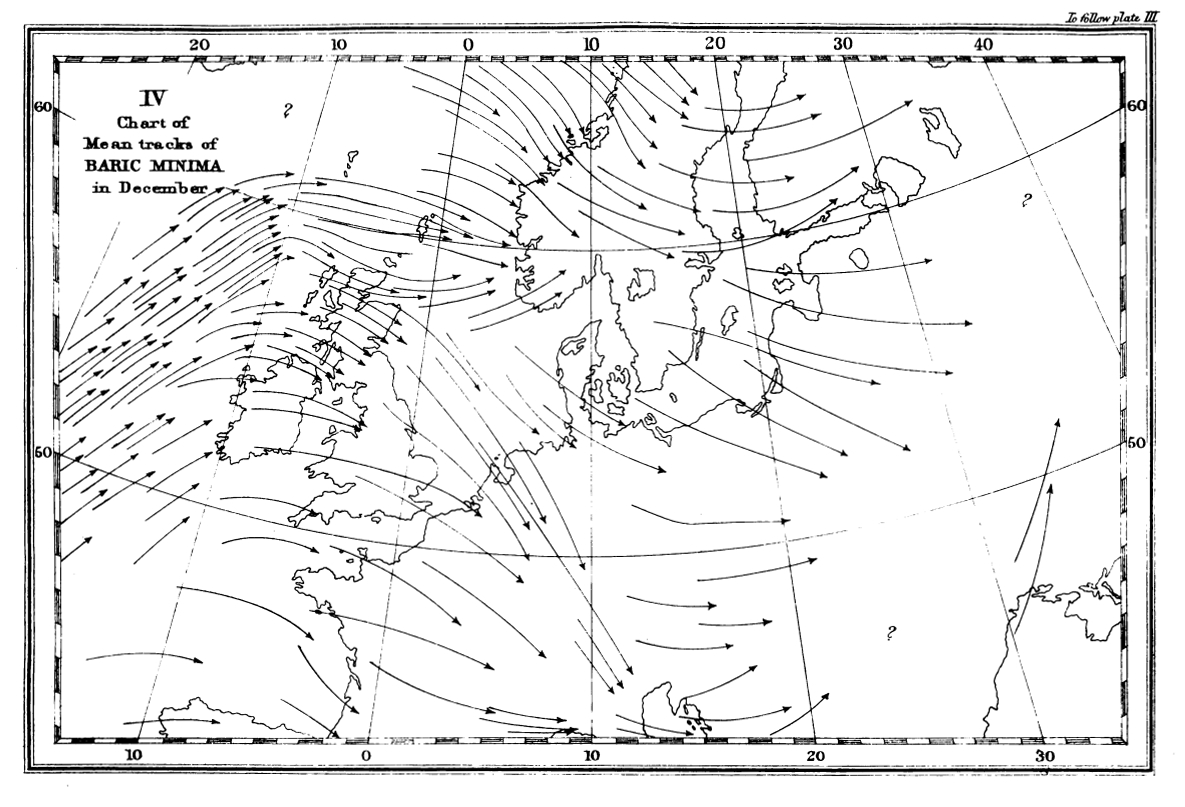
Chart of winds in Europe, 1872
