= ROFOR =

Format for reporting weather information

ROFOR is a format for reporting weather information. ROFOR is an abbreviation for "Route Forecast". As the name suggests is the weather forecast of the route of any aircraft which will be flying through the route. ROFOR contains various information regarding date and time of forecast, direction and speed of the wind, aerodrome ICAO code for which the forecast is made, cloud levels and freezing (icing) levels, turbulence and vertical wind shear information.

== Example ==
Example of ROFOR report:

ROFOR 060300Z 0606/0612 KT VIDP 12580 2AC120 4CI300 7///180 403028 27010 405020 28015 407015 30020 410010 33025 523306 631209 11111 12775 40120 22222 38150 27115=

Interpretation of report:

Element	Meaning
ROFOR	ROUTE FORECAST
060300Z	ISSUED ON 06 DAY AT 03:00 UTC
0606/0612	VALID ON 6TH DAY FROM 06:00 UTC TO 12:00 UTC
KT	WIND SPEED IN KNOTS
VIDP 12580	ROUTE PALAM (NEW DELHI) TO (QUADRANT 1) 25N80E
2AC120 4CI300	CLOUDS 12,000 FT 4CI 30,000 FT
7///180	FREEZING LEVEL AT 18,000 FT
405020 28015	AT 5000 FT TEMP. IS 20 DEG CELSIUS WIND FROM 280 DEG AT 15 KNOTS (+ 3 more similar groups)
523306	MODERATE CAT AT 33,000 FT WITH THICKNESS 6,000 FT
631209	LIGHT ICING WITH PRECIPITATION AT 12,000 FT WITH THICKNESS 9,000 FT
11111	INDICATES JET STREAM LOCATION
22222	INDICATES MAX WIND, VERTICAL WIND SHEAR AND DIRECTION WITH ALTITUDE
