= Coastal flood warning =

Flood warning issued by the National Weather Service of the United States

A coastal flood warning is a hazardous weather statement issued by the Weather Forecast Offices of the National Weather Service in the United States which indicates coastal flooding is either imminent or occurring along the coast of the Atlantic Ocean, Pacific Ocean, Arctic Ocean, or the Gulf of Mexico. The flooding must be due to water being forced from the nearby body of water onto the land, and not from rainfall. Nor'easters, hurricanes, tropical storms, and thunderstorms can all lead to the issuance of a coastal flood warning.

== Example ==
Coastal flood warning in Maryland
An example of a coastal flood warning in Calvert, MD, and St Mary’s, MD on 8 January 2024.

The following is an example of a coastal flood warning issued by the National Weather Service office in Boston, Massachusetts.

000
WHUS41 KBOX 071920
CFWBOX

URGENT - IMMEDIATE BROADCAST REQUESTED
COASTAL HAZARD MESSAGE
NATIONAL WEATHER SERVICE TAUNTON MA
220 PM EST THU FEB 7 2013

...COASTAL FLOOD WARNING FOR THE MASSACHUSETTS EAST FACING
COASTLINE AROUND THE TIME OF THE FRIDAY EVENING AND SATURDAY
MORNING HIGH TIDES...

.A POWERFUL COASTAL STORM WILL PRODUCE MODERATE COASTAL FLOODING
FRIDAY EVENING AND MODERATE TO MAJOR COASTAL FLOODING SATURDAY
MORNING ALONG WITH POTENTIALLY SEVERE EROSION. LARGE WAVES
COMBINED WITH A 2 TO 3 FOOT STORM SURGE MAY CAUSE A NUMBER OF
VULNERABLE SHORE ROADS TO BECOME IMPASSABLE FOR A WHILE...AND
MAY CAUSE DAMAGE TO HOMES ALONG THE IMMEDIATE SHORELINE DURING
THE SATURDAY MORNING HIGH TIDE.

MAZ007-015-016-019-022>024-080330-
/O.NEW.KBOX.CF.W.0001.130209T0100Z-130209T1700Z/
/O.EXT.KBOX.CF.A.0001.130209T1700Z-130209T1800Z/
EASTERN ESSEX MA-SUFFOLK MA-EASTERN NORFOLK MA-
EASTERN PLYMOUTH MA-BARNSTABLE MA-DUKES MA-NANTUCKET MA-
220 PM EST THU FEB 7 2013

...COASTAL FLOOD WARNING IN EFFECT FROM 8 PM FRIDAY TO NOON EST
SATURDAY...

THE NATIONAL WEATHER SERVICE IN TAUNTON HAS ISSUED A COASTAL
FLOOD WARNING...WHICH IS IN EFFECT FROM 8 PM FRIDAY TO NOON EST
SATURDAY.

* LOCATION...EAST FACING COASTLINE OF MASSACHUSETTS

* COASTAL FLOODING...MODERATE COASTAL FLOODING IS LIKELY FOR THE
  FRIDAY EVENING HIGH TIDE AND MODERATE TO MAJOR COASTAL FLOODING
  IS LIKELY FOR THE SATURDAY MORNING HIGH TIDE...WITH THE MOST
  SEVERE IMPACT EXPECTED ALONG EAST AND NORTH FACING SHORELINES
  SOUTH OF BOSTON.

* TIMING...FRIDAY EVENING AND SATURDAY MORNING HIGH TIDES

* IMPACTS...A NUMBER OF SHORE ROADS WILL LIKELY BECOME IMPASSABLE
  FOR A TIME FRIDAY EVENING. COASTAL FLOODING AROUND THE SATURDAY
  MORNING HIGH TIDE WILL LIKELY CAUSE NUMEROUS SHORE ROADS TO
  BECOME IMPASSABLE AND PUT SOME STRUCTURES AT RISK ALONG THE
  IMMEDIATE SHORE...ESPECIALLY THOSE VULNERABLE LOCATIONS SOUTH OF
  BOSTON FROM HULL TO SANDWICH. SEVERE BEACH EROSION WILL ALSO
  OCCUR...ESPECIALLY DURING THE SATURDAY MORNING HIGH TIDE.

PRECAUTIONARY/PREPAREDNESS ACTIONS...

A COASTAL FLOOD WARNING MEANS THAT MODERATE OR MAJOR COASTAL
FLOODING IS LIKELY. MODERATE COASTAL FLOODING PRODUCES WIDESPREAD
FLOODING OF VULNERABLE SHORE ROADS AND/OR BASEMENTS DUE TO THE
HEIGHT OF STORM TIDE AND/OR WAVE ACTION. NUMEROUS ROAD CLOSURES
ARE NEEDED. LIVES MAY BE AT RISK FOR PEOPLE WHO PUT THEMSELVES IN
HARMS WAY. ISOLATED STRUCTURAL DAMAGE MAY BE OBSERVED.

MAJOR COASTAL FLOODING IS CONSIDERED SEVERE ENOUGH TO CAUSE AT
LEAST SCATTERED STRUCTURAL DAMAGE ALONG WITH WIDESPREAD FLOODING
OF VULNERABLE SHORE ROADS AND/OR BASEMENTS.  SOME VULNERABLE
HOMES MAY BE SEVERELY DAMAGED OR DESTROYED. EVACUATION OF SOME
NEIGHBORHOODS MAY BE NECESSARY.

&&

&&

ALL TIDE HEIGHTS ARE RELATIVE TO MEAN LOWER LOW WATER. TIME OF
HIGH TOTAL TIDES ARE APPROXIMATE TO THE NEAREST HOUR.

NEWBURYPORT

   TOTAL                ASTRO
    TIDE    DAY/TIME     TIDE    SURGE    WAVES      FLOOD
    /FT/                 /FT/     /FT/     /FT/    CATEGORY
  -------  ----------  -------  -------  -------  ----------
     8.3    07/09 PM     8.3      0.0       1        NONE
     9.9    08/09 AM     9.7      0.2      2-3       NONE
    11.1    08/10 PM     8.6      2.5      8-13     MINOR
    12.1    09/10 AM     9.9      2.2       21     MDT-MAJOR
     9.0    09/11 PM     9.0      0.0      8-10      NONE
    10.0    10/11 AM    10.0      0.0       5        NONE

GLOUCESTER HARBOR

   TOTAL                ASTRO
    TIDE    DAY/TIME     TIDE    SURGE    WAVES      FLOOD
    /FT/                 /FT/     /FT/     /FT/    CATEGORY
  -------  ----------  -------  -------  -------  ----------
     9.1    07/09 PM     9.1      0.0       1        NONE
    11.0    08/09 AM    10.7      0.3      3-4       NONE
    12.0    08/10 PM     9.5      2.5     12-18     MINOR
    13.1    09/10 AM    10.9      2.2       21     MODERATE
     9.8    09/11 PM     9.8      0.0       10       NONE
    10.9    10/11 AM    10.9      0.0      6-7       NONE

REVERE

   TOTAL                ASTRO
    TIDE    DAY/TIME     TIDE    SURGE    WAVES      FLOOD
    /FT/                 /FT/     /FT/     /FT/    CATEGORY
  -------  ----------  -------  -------  -------  ----------
     9.6    07/09 PM     9.6      0.0       1        NONE
    11.4    08/09 AM    11.2      0.2      2-3       NONE
    12.5    08/10 PM    10.0      2.5      8-12     MINOR
    14.0    09/10 AM    11.5      2.5       13     MDT-MAJOR
    10.3    09/11 PM    10.3      0.0      7-9       NONE
    11.5    10/11 AM    11.5      0.0       5        NONE

BOSTON HARBOR

   TOTAL                ASTRO
    TIDE    DAY/TIME     TIDE    SURGE    WAVES      FLOOD
    /FT/                 /FT/     /FT/     /FT/    CATEGORY
  -------  ----------  -------  -------  -------  ----------
     9.6    07/09 PM     9.6      0.0       1        NONE
    11.4    08/09 AM    11.2      0.2       2        NONE
    12.8    08/10 PM    10.0      2.8      3-4     MODERATE
    14.0    09/10 AM    11.5      2.5       3      MODERATE
    10.3    09/11 PM    10.3      0.0      2-3       NONE
    11.5    10/11 AM    11.5      0.0       1        NONE

SCITUATE

   TOTAL                ASTRO
    TIDE    DAY/TIME     TIDE    SURGE    WAVES      FLOOD
    /FT/                 /FT/     /FT/     /FT/    CATEGORY
  -------  ----------  -------  -------  -------  ----------
     9.4    07/09 PM     9.4      0.0       1        NONE
    11.3    08/09 AM    11.0      0.3      3-4      MINOR
    12.6    08/10 PM     9.8      2.8      8-17    MODERATE
    14.2    09/10 AM    11.2      3.0       26      MAJOR
    10.1    09/11 PM    10.1      0.0     10-13      NONE
    11.3    10/11 AM    11.3      0.0      6-7      MINOR

SANDWICH HARBOR

   TOTAL                ASTRO
    TIDE    DAY/TIME     TIDE    SURGE    WAVES      FLOOD
    /FT/                 /FT/     /FT/     /FT/    CATEGORY
  -------  ----------  -------  -------  -------  ----------
     9.0    07/09 PM     9.0      0.0      1-2       NONE
    11.1    08/09 AM    10.5      0.6      2-3       NONE
    12.5    08/10 PM     9.4      3.1      7-11    MODERATE
    14.7    09/10 AM    10.7      4.0       20      MAJOR
     9.7    09/11 PM     9.7      0.0      6-8       NONE
    10.8    10/11 AM    10.8      0.0      3-4       NONE

PROVINCETOWN HARBOR

   TOTAL                ASTRO
    TIDE    DAY/TIME     TIDE    SURGE    WAVES      FLOOD
    /FT/                 /FT/     /FT/     /FT/    CATEGORY
  -------  ----------  -------  -------  -------  ----------
     9.6    07/09 PM     9.6      0.0       1        NONE
    11.4    08/09 AM    11.1      0.3      2-3       NONE
    11.3    08/10 PM     9.9      1.4      7-12     MINOR
    12.6    09/10 AM    11.3      1.3       15     MODERATE
    10.2    09/11 PM    10.2      0.0      8-10      NONE
    11.4    10/11 AM    11.4      0.0       5        NONE

CHATHAM - EAST COAST

   TOTAL                ASTRO
    TIDE    DAY/TIME     TIDE    SURGE    WAVES      FLOOD
    /FT/                 /FT/     /FT/     /FT/    CATEGORY
  -------  ----------  -------  -------  -------  ----------
     4.2    07/09 PM     4.2      0.0      2-3       NONE
     6.0    08/10 AM     5.3      0.7      4-6       NONE
     7.4    08/10 PM     4.4      3.0     12-16      NONE
     8.3    09/11 AM     5.3      3.0       32     MDT-MAJOR
     4.6    09/11 PM     4.6      0.0     12-15      NONE

CHATHAM - SOUTH COAST

   TOTAL                ASTRO
    TIDE    DAY/TIME     TIDE    SURGE    WAVES      FLOOD
    /FT/                 /FT/     /FT/     /FT/    CATEGORY
  -------  ----------  -------  -------  -------  ----------
     4.0    07/10 PM     4.0      0.0      1-2       NONE
     5.6    08/10 AM     5.2      0.4      3-5       NONE
     5.4    08/11 PM     4.2      1.2      8-9       NONE
     5.7    09/11 AM     5.2      0.5       10       NONE
     4.3    09/11 PM     4.3      0.0      6-7       NONE

BUZZARDS BAY - WOODS HOLE

   TOTAL                ASTRO
    TIDE    DAY/TIME     TIDE    SURGE    WAVES      FLOOD
    /FT/                 /FT/     /FT/     /FT/    CATEGORY
  -------  ----------  -------  -------  -------  ----------
     2.1    07/06 PM     2.1      0.0       1        NONE
     3.1    08/06 AM     2.9      0.2       2        NONE
     2.9    08/06 PM     2.2      0.7      4-6       NONE
     3.0    09/07 AM     2.9      0.1      7-8       NONE
     2.4    10/07 PM     2.4      0.0      3-4       NONE
     2.8    10/08 AM     2.8      0.0       2        NONE

VINEYARD HAVEN

   TOTAL                ASTRO
    TIDE    DAY/TIME     TIDE    SURGE    WAVES      FLOOD
    /FT/                 /FT/     /FT/     /FT/    CATEGORY
  -------  ----------  -------  -------  -------  ----------
     2.2    07/09 PM     2.2      0.0       1        NONE
     3.5    08/09 AM     3.0      0.5       3        NONE
     5.1    08/10 PM     2.3      2.8      6-8      MINOR
     3.2    09/10 AM     3.0      0.2       8        NONE
     2.4    09/11 PM     2.4      0.0      3-4       NONE
     2.9    10/11 AM     2.9      0.0      1-2       NONE

NANTUCKET HARBOR

   TOTAL                ASTRO
    TIDE    DAY/TIME     TIDE    SURGE    WAVES      FLOOD
    /FT/                 /FT/     /FT/     /FT/    CATEGORY
  -------  ----------  -------  -------  -------  ----------
     3.2    07/10 PM     3.2      0.0       2        NONE
     4.8    08/10 AM     4.2      0.6      3-5      MINOR
     6.3    08/11 PM     3.3      3.0      8-10    MODERATE
     6.1    09/11 AM     4.2      1.9       10     MODERATE
     3.5    10/12 AM     3.4      0.1      5-6       NONE

NANTUCKET EAST COAST

   TOTAL                ASTRO
    TIDE    DAY/TIME     TIDE    SURGE    WAVES      FLOOD
    /FT/                 /FT/     /FT/     /FT/    CATEGORY
  -------  ----------  -------  -------  -------  ----------
     3.3    07/09 PM     3.3      0.0      2-3       NONE
     4.8    08/10 AM     4.4      0.4      4-6       NONE
     6.4    08/10 PM     3.4      3.0     12-14    MODERATE
     7.6    09/11 AM     4.4      3.2       29      MAJOR
     3.6    09/11 PM     3.6      0.0     10-12      NONE

NANTUCKET SOUTH COAST

   TOTAL                ASTRO
    TIDE    DAY/TIME     TIDE    SURGE    WAVES      FLOOD
    /FT/                 /FT/     /FT/     /FT/    CATEGORY
  -------  ----------  -------  -------  -------  ----------
     3.1    07/10 PM     3.1      0.0      2-3       NONE
     4.6    08/10 AM     4.2      0.4      4-6       NONE
     4.3    08/10 PM     3.2      1.1     12-14      NONE
     4.6    09/11 AM     4.2      0.4       17       NONE
     3.4    10/12 AM     3.4      0.0      7-8       NONE

$$

THOMPSON

== See also ==
- Severe weather terminology (United States)
