= MAFOR =

MAFOR, an abbreviation of MArine FORecast, is a North American code used in the transmission of marine weather forecasts to compress a volume of meteorological and marine information into shorter code for convenience during radio broadcasting. The MAFOR forecast usually supplies the period of validity for the forecast, future wind speed and direction, weather, visibility and 'state of sea.'

== Format ==
A MAFOR code begins with a date and time group, followed by the name of the area to which the forecast applies, followed by one or more groups of five figures, which may be followed by another optional group.

== Date Group ==
YYG1G1/ where

- YY is the day of the month in accordance with Coordinated Universal Time (UTC)
- G1G1 is the time of the beginning of the valid period of the forecasts in Coordinated Universal Time (UTC).
- "/" is the last digit of this group is not used.

== Weather Group ==
1GDFmW1 1: is an identifying number required by international practice. Each code group following the name of the lake will begin with 1. G: is the code figure for the period of time covered by the forecast given in the group.

=== Time Period of Forecast Coverage ===
- 0 - Existing weather conditions at the beginning of the forecast period
- 1 - Forecast valid for 3 hours
- 2 - Forecast valid for 6 hours
- 3 - Forecast valid for 9 hours
- 4 - Forecast valid for 12 hours
- 5 - Forecast valid for 18 hours
- 6 - Forecast valid for 24 hours
- 7 - Forecast valid for 48 hours
- 8 - Forecast valid for 72 hours
- 9 - Occasionally

D: is the code figure for the forecast direction of the wind.

=== Direction of Wind ===
- 0 - Calm
- 1 - Northeast
- 2 - East
- 3 - Southeast
- 4 - South
- 5 - Southwest
- 6 - West
- 7 - Northwest
- 8 - North
- 9 - Variable

Fm: is the code figure for the forecast speed of the wind

=== Speed of Wind ===
- 0 - Beaufort Number 0-3 (0 - 10 knots)
- 1 - Beaufort Number 4 (11 - 16 knots)
- 2 - Beaufort Number 5 (17 - 21 knots)
- 3 - Beaufort Number 6 (22 - 27 knots)
- 4 - Beaufort Number 7 (28 - 33 knots)
- 5 - Beaufort Number 8 (34 - 40 knots)
- 6 - Beaufort Number 9 (41 - 47 knots)
- 7 - Beaufort Number 10 (48 - 55 knots)
- 8 - Beaufort Number 11 (56 - 63 knots)
- 9 - Beaufort Number 12 (64 - 71 knots)

W1: is the code figure for forecast weather.

=== Weather ===
- 0 - Moderate or good visibility (greater than 3 nautical miles)
- 1 - Risk of ice accumulation on superstructure (air temperature between 0 °C and -5 °C
- 2 - Strong risk of accumulation of ice on superstructure (air temperature below -5 °C
- 3 - Mist (visibility 1/2 to 3 nautical miles)
- 4 - Fog (visibility less than 1/2 nautical mile)
- 5 - Drizzle
- 6 - Rain
- 7 - Snow or rain and snow
- 8 - Squally weather with or without showers
- 9 - Thunder storms

2: identifies the group as a supplementary group. The 2 group is valid for the same period as the group that immediately precedes it. V: is the code figure for the forecast visibility.

=== Visibility ===
- 0 - Less than 50 meters
- 1 - 50 – 200 meters
- 2 - 200 – 500 meters
- 3 – 500 meters to 1/2 nautical mile
- 4 - 1/2 to 1 nautical mile
- 5 - 1 to 2 nautical miles
- 6 - 2 to 5 nautical miles
- 7 - 5 to 12 nautical miles
- 8 - 12 to 20 nautical miles

S: is the code figure for the forecast sea state.

=== State of Sea ===
Height in Meters

- 0 - Calm (glassy)
- 1 - Calm (rippled) - 0.0 - 0.1
- 2 - Smooth (wavelets) - 0.1 - 0.5
- 3 - Slight - 0.5 - 1.25
- 4 - Moderate - 1.25 - 2.5
- 5 - Rough - 2.5 - 4
- 6 - Very Rough - 4.0 - 6
- 7 - High - 6.0 - 9
- 8 - Very High - 9.0 - 14
- 9 - Phenomenal - over 14

== Example of a Marine Forecast ==
MAFOR 0403/ - Superior 12646 14755 245H 12720 - Ontario 15820 12804

Referring to the codes above, this may be decoded as follows: MAFOR 0403/: Marine forecast valid from 03 Coordinated Universal Time of the fourth day of the current month

Lake Superior: first 6 hours of the forecast period -wind west at 28 - 33 knots, with rain. Next 12 hours of forecast period - wind northwest 34 - 40 knots, with drizzle. During the same period - visibility 1/2 - 1 nautical mile, with rough seas, wave heights of 2.5 - 4 m. Final 6 hours of the forecast period -wind northwest at 17 - 21 knots, visibility greater than 3 nautical miles

Lake Ontario: First 18 hours of forecast period -wind north 17 - 21 knots, visibility greater than 3 nautical miles, final 6 hours of forecast period - wind north at 10 knots or less, with fog reducing visibility to less than 1/2 nautical mile.

== MAFOR Synopsis ==
Each MAFOR broadcast is followed by a brief technical synopsis of the current weather map in plain language. The synopsis gives the location of the centers of significant high and low pressure areas, and their forecast motion (direction and speed). Reference is occasionally made to marked wind shift lines, giving the anticipated time at which the wind shift will occur at key points.

The following is an example of the type of synopsis that is issued: Low Chicago moving ENE 35 High New York City moving e 15 Wind shift SW to NW Detroit early morning Kingston late evening
