= List of ocean circulation models =

This is a list of ocean circulation models, as used in physical oceanography. Ocean circulation models can also be used to study chemical oceanography, biological oceanography, geological oceanography, and climate science.

| Acronym | Full name |
|---|---|
| ADCIRC | ADvanced CIRCulation model |
| COCO | CCSR (Center for Climate System Research) Ocean Component Model |
| CROCO | Coastal and Regional Ocean COmmunity model |
| COHERENS | COupled Hydrodynamical Ecological model for REgioNal Shelf seas |
| FVCOM | Finite Volume Community Ocean Model |
| FESOM | AWI Finite-Element/volumE Sea ice-Ocean Model |
| FRAM | Fine Resolution Antarctic Ocean Model |
| HOPE | The Hamburg Ocean Primitive Equation General Circulation Model |
| HYCOM | HYbrid Coordinate Ocean Model |
| LSG | The Hamburg Large Scale Geostrophic Ocean General Circulation Model |
| MICOM | Miami Isopycnic Coordinate Ocean Model |
| MITgcm | M.I.T. General Circulation Model |
| MOHID | MOdelo HIDrodinâmico |
| MOM | GFDL Modular Ocean Model |
| MOMA | MOM for Array Processors |
| OCCAM | Ocean Circulation and Climate Advanced Ocean Model |
| NEMO | Nucleus for European Modelling of the Ocean |
| OPYC | The Ocean IsoPYCnal General Circulation Model |
| POM | Princeton Ocean Model |
| POP | The Parallel Ocean Program |
| ROMS | The Regional Ocean Modeling System |
| Veros | Versatile Ocean Simulator in Pure Python |

== Integrated ocean modeling systems ==
Integrated ocean modeling systems use multiple coupled models. This coupling allows researchers to understand processes that happen among multiple systems that are usually modeled independently, such as the ocean, atmosphere, waves, and sediments. Integrated ocean modeling systems is helpful for specific regions: for example, the ESPreSSO model is used to study the Mid-Atlantic Bight region. Integrated ocean modeling systems often use data from buoys and weather stations for atmospheric forcing and boundary conditions. Two examples of integrated ocean modeling systems are:

- COAWST: Coupled Ocean Atmosphere Wave Sediment Transport Modeling System (uses ROMS as its ocean circulation component).
- ESPreSSO: Experimental System for Predicting Shelf and Slope Optics (uses ROMS as its ocean circulation component).
