= Arakawa grids =

Grid layouts in atmosphere and ocean models

Diagram of the five Arakawa grids, A to E: where the height and the two velocity components are defined on the grid of a numerical weather, climate, or ocean model.

The Arakawa grids are five ways, labeled A to E, of arranging the velocity components and the variables that describe the mass of a fluid, such as its depth or pressure, on the rectangular grids of weather, climate and ocean models.

The A grid defines all the variables at the same points. The other four are staggered grids, which define different variables at different points. The grids are named after Akio Arakawa, who devised them with Frank Winninghoff at the University of California, Los Angeles (UCLA) in the 1960s and described them with Vivian Lamb in 1977.

Staggering lets a model compute pressure gradients and the divergence of the flow over one grid interval instead of two, which improves the accuracy of short waves at no extra computational cost. The choice of grid matters greatly for the inertia–gravity waves through which the atmosphere and the ocean adjust to geostrophic balance, because their dispersion depends on how the variables are arranged. Arakawa and Lamb found that the C grid simulates this adjustment best, unless the radius of deformation is about the grid spacing or smaller; on such coarse grids the B grid can do better. The C grid has often been chosen for grid-point atmospheric models. Ocean models, which must represent motions with much smaller internal radii of deformation, long used the B grid, but many now use the C grid.

== Background ==
When solving differential equations using a finite difference method, each variable is represented by its values at a set of grid points, and derivatives are approximated by differences between neighboring values. If all the variables are defined at the same points, the simplest centered difference at a point spans two grid intervals, from the point before it to the point after it.

In the shallow water equations, for example, the velocity changes in response to the gradient of the fluid depth, and the depth in response to the divergence of the velocity. If the depth is defined halfway between velocity points, both derivatives can be computed over a single grid interval. For these terms, this is equivalent to doubling the resolution, and it reduces the leading spatial truncation-error term by a factor of four, with no extra grid points or computation. Advection terms still need differences over two intervals though.

Because the differences span shorter distances, a model on a staggered grid may need a shorter time step to remain stable by satisfying the CFL condition. Some time-stepping schemes avoid this, but it is often impossible to choose a single staggering that improves the accuracy of every term.

Staggering can also eliminate spurious stationary solutions. On an unstaggered grid, a centered pressure gradient cannot detect a height field that alternates between two values at successive points. Such a field can therefore remain stationary with zero velocity, although it is not a stationary solution of the continuous equations. The corresponding one-dimensional staggered scheme removes this spurious height mode.

For one-dimensional gravity waves without rotation or a mean flow, second-order centered differences give the shortest resolvable wave, two grid intervals long, zero phase speed on an unstaggered grid. On a staggered grid its phase speed is about 64% of the correct value, although its group velocity is zero. These results neglect time-discretization error. A disturbance that spuriously fails to propagate is sometimes called a computational mode.

In this one-dimensional example, the shorter-wavelength half of the spectrum on the unstaggered grid has group velocities of the wrong sign, so wave energy travels in the wrong direction. Such waves are sometimes called parasitic modes. On the staggered grid, the group velocity has the correct sign except at the shortest resolvable wavelength, where it is zero.

Large-scale flows in the atmosphere and the ocean are close to geostrophic balance, in which the Coriolis force balances the pressure gradient. When this balance is upset, inertia–gravity waves radiate the imbalance away and leave a balanced flow behind, a process called geostrophic adjustment. How well a model simulates geostrophic adjustment depends strongly on how its variables are distributed over the grid points, because each arrangement gives the inertia–gravity waves different dispersion properties.

== The five grids ==
Arakawa and Lamb compared the five ways of distributing the fluid depth h and the velocity components u and v over a square grid, using the simplest second-order finite-difference scheme for each one. Where a term needs a variable at a point where it is not defined, the scheme averages the values at the nearest points where it is. Grids B and E, which keep the two velocity components together, are called semi-staggered, while grids C and D are fully staggered. The descriptions below place h at the center of each grid cell. The grids are also sometimes drawn with h at the corners, as Arakawa and Lamb drew them, but the arrangements are equivalent.

=== A grid ===
The A grid defines u, v and h at the same points, and is the only unstaggered one of the five. It is simple, and higher-order schemes are easy to build on it, but all its differences span two grid intervals. Neighboring points are not coupled through the pressure gradient and the divergence, so a checkerboard pattern can develop, which models suppress with high-order diffusion. Such grid-scale noise cannot take part in geostrophic adjustment.

=== B grid ===
The B grid defines u and v together at the corners of the cells. The Coriolis force, which couples the two components, needs no averaging, but the pressure gradient and the divergence are averaged over two neighboring differences. As a result, a checkerboard pattern in the height exerts no pressure gradient force, and a checkerboard pattern in the velocity causes no divergence, so both are decoupled from the rest of the solution. The shortest distance over which the B grid takes differences is the diagonal of a cell, $\sqrt{2}$ times the grid spacing.

Kirk Bryan built his 1969 ocean model on the B grid, which was thought to be better suited to the coarse resolutions of the time. The ocean models descended from it, sometimes referred to as being part of the Bryan–Semtner–Cox lineage, kept the B grid even at finer resolutions. In 2013 the Modular Ocean Model and the Parallel Ocean Program used the B grid.

=== C grid ===
The C grid defines each velocity component at the middle of the cell faces across which it flows. u is defined on the faces between neighboring cells in the x direction, and v on those between neighboring cells in the y direction. The pressure gradient and the divergence are then computed over a single grid interval with a compact stencil, and the divergence falls at the center of each cell, where h is. The C grid also simplifies the computation of advection and friction, because the velocity that carries properties across the cell faces is the velocity the model predicts. The Coriolis force, however, needs v at the u points and u at the v points, which the scheme takes as the average of the four nearest values.

When the grid spacing is large compared with the radius of deformation, this averaging lets grid-scale noise persist in the divergence of the flow. The same arrangement, with the pressure at the cell centers, is the standard staggered grid for computing incompressible flows in computational fluid dynamics, used for example in the marker-and-cell method.

The general circulation model of UCLA has used it since its third version, built in the mid-1970s, from which the US Navy's NOGAPS forecasting system evolved. The C grid is also used in the Advanced Research core of the Weather Research and Forecasting Model, and in almost all models of convective storms. As of 2013, the C grid was also used in the HyCOM, MITgcm, NEMO, POM, and ROMS ocean models. As of 2019, version 6 of the Modular Ocean Model, the ocean component of the Geophysical Fluid Dynamics Laboratory's OM4.0 ocean and sea-ice model, also uses the C grid.

=== D grid ===
The D grid switches the positions of u and v on the C grid, so that each velocity component lies along a cell face instead of across it. The vorticity, rather than the divergence, then falls at the center of each cell. Geostrophic balance takes its simplest form on the D grid, which motivated Arakawa's choice of it for the first-generation UCLA model. But the Coriolis force, the pressure gradient and the divergence all need averaging, and of the grids A to D it represents inertia–gravity waves least accurately. Winninghoff wrote that on the D grid "it is easy to excite but not to control the small scale noise".

Staggering the variables in time as well as in space, as Arnt Eliassen proposed, makes all its differences span a single grid interval with leapfrog time stepping, and Shian-Jiann Lin and Richard B. Rood took up a similar idea in a global shallow-water model in 1997. They predicted the winds on the D grid, which suits the computation of vorticity and of balanced flow, but computed the time-centered winds that carry the mass on the C grid, which avoids the two-grid-interval gravity waves that the D grid alone would produce.

=== E grid ===
The E grid places h and the velocity points alternately, like the squares of a checkerboard, so that it is the B grid rotated by 45°. Arakawa and Lamb chose its spacing so that it has as many points as the other grids in a given area. No term needs averaging on the E grid, and inertia–gravity waves disperse on it as they do on the B grid rotated by 45°, so the two are often treated together as the B/E grid. Both grids are made of two interleaved C grids that the pressure gradient and the divergence do not connect: a disturbance at one height point sends gravity waves only through its own subgrid, and the two subgrids are coupled only through the slower Coriolis and advection terms.

Winninghoff built the shallow-water model of his 1968 thesis on the E grid. The E grid was used by the Eta model of the US National Centers for Environmental Prediction.

== History ==
Yale Mintz and Akio Arakawa built a series of general circulation models of the atmosphere at UCLA beginning in 1961. A preliminary version used the C grid, but Arakawa switched to the D grid before completing the first-generation model.. Once moisture was added to the model, noise appeared in its pressure and temperature fields and spread with an unphysically large group velocity. Arakawa then studied, with Frank Winninghoff, how geostrophic adjustment works on five arrangements of the variables, each with the simplest centered differences.

Winninghoff, whose doctoral committee Arakawa chaired, was studying how to give a forecast balanced initial winds and heights by letting the model itself adjust toward geostrophic balance, and first had to find a scheme that simulates the adjustment well. His 1968 thesis draws the five arrangements and labels them Scheme A to Scheme E. It compares the frequencies of inertia–gravity waves on each of them when the radius of deformation is twice and half the grid spacing, and then follows a disturbance at a single grid point in a nonlinear shallow-water model built on each arrangement. Winninghoff found that how well a scheme simulates geostrophic adjustment depends strongly on the arrangement. In his experiments the C grid adjusted best when the grid spacing was half the radius of deformation and behaved poorly when it was twice the radius, and the D grid was noisy at both. He rejected the A, C and D grids and built the model for the rest of his thesis on the E grid, noting that a modified B scheme was by then in use in the UCLA general circulation model. Arakawa's 1972 report on the design of the model presents the comparison as his and Winninghoff's joint work.

Arakawa judged the C grid the best for geostrophic adjustment and the D grid the worst, but because the C grid has difficulties of its own, notably with the higher vertical modes, he chose the B grid for the second generation of the model as a compromise. The third generation, built in the mid-1970s, returned to the C grid, which all later versions have used.

Fedor Mesinger and Arakawa described the comparison of the grids in a 1976 monograph for the Global Atmospheric Research Program, by which time the C grid was used both in the UCLA model and in the operational forecasting model of the British Met Office. Arakawa and Vivian Lamb published it in 1977, as part of their description of the third-generation UCLA model. They concluded that, for geostrophic adjustment, only one distribution of the variables was satisfactory: the C grid. On it they built a scheme for the nonlinear shallow water equations that conserves total energy and momentum, and also enstrophy when the flow is nondivergent. Conserving both energy and enstrophy prevents a spurious cascade of energy to the smallest scales in long integrations. The grids are named after Arakawa.

== Differences and averages ==
Arakawa and Lamb wrote their schemes with two operators, a difference and an average of neighboring values. In the x direction, for a variable q at grid index i, j the difference operator is
$$\left(\delta_x q\right)_{i,j} = q_{i+\frac{1}{2},\,j} - q_{i-\frac{1}{2},\,j},$$
and the averaging operator is
$$\left(\overline{q}^{\,x}\right)_{i,j} = \frac{1}{2}\left(q_{i+\frac{1}{2},\,j} + q_{i-\frac{1}{2},\,j}\right).$$
Likewise for $\delta_y$ and $\overline{q}^{\,y}$ in the y direction, with $\overline{q}^{\,xy} = \overline{\overline{q}^x}^y = \overline{\overline{q}^y}^x$.

The indices count grid intervals, so that a half-integer index $i + \tfrac{1}{2}$ is a point halfway between the two grid points $i$ and $i + 1$. Each operator produces a value halfway between the two points it uses. There, the difference divided by the grid spacing d approximates the derivative $\partial q / \partial x$ to second order in d.

Each equation of a scheme is evaluated where the variable that it predicts is defined, and the operators bring the other variables to that point. That is possible because the operators take in values at the halfway points and produce values at the integer index points, and vice versa. The table shows the approximation to the height gradient $\partial h/\partial x$ and the value of v needed at a u point. The corresponding pressure-gradient acceleration is $-g$ times the height gradient. The equation for v follows by interchanging u with v and x with y, and reversing the sign of the Coriolis term. The divergence in the equation for h uses the same difference and averaging operators as the pressure gradient.

Terms of the equation for u. Indices count distances d on grids A–D and $d^*$ on grid E. On grids A–D, h is at whole-number indices; the E row instead places a velocity point at (i, j).
Grid	u location	Height gradient $\partial h / \partial x$	v at the u point
A	(i, j)	$\frac{1}{d}\overline{\delta_x h}^{\,x} = \frac{h_{i+1,j} - h_{i-1,j}}{2d}$	$v_{i,j}$
B	(i + ½, j + ½)	$\frac{1}{d}\overline{\delta_x h}^{\,y} = \frac{\left(h_{i+1,j+1} + h_{i+1,j}\right) - \left(h_{i,j+1} + h_{i,j}\right)}{2d}$	$v_{i+1/2,\,j+1/2}$
C	(i + ½, j)	$\frac{1}{d}\delta_x h = \frac{h_{i+1,j} - h_{i,j}}{d}$	$\overline{v}^{\,xy} = \tfrac{1}{4}\left(v_{i,j+1/2} + v_{i,j-1/2} + v_{i+1,j+1/2} + v_{i+1,j-1/2}\right)$
D	(i, j + ½)	$\frac{1}{d}\overline{\delta_x h}^{\,xy} = \frac{\left(h_{i+1,j+1} - h_{i-1,j+1}\right) + \left(h_{i+1,j} - h_{i-1,j}\right)}{4d}$	$\overline{v}^{\,xy} = \tfrac{1}{4}\left(v_{i+1/2,j+1} + v_{i+1/2,j} + v_{i-1/2,j+1} + v_{i-1/2,j}\right)$
E	(i, j), with grid spacing $d^* = \sqrt{2}d$	$\frac{1}{d^*}\delta_x h = \frac{h_{i+1/2,j} - h_{i-1/2,j}}{d^*}$	$v_{i,j}$

== Shallow-water equations on the grids ==
Arakawa and Lamb, following Winninghoff, compared the grids using the shallow water equations linearized about a fluid at rest on an f-plane,
$$\frac{\partial u}{\partial t} = fv - g\frac{\partial h}{\partial x},$$
$$\frac{\partial v}{\partial t} = - fu - g\frac{\partial h}{\partial y},$$
$$\frac{\partial h}{\partial t} = - H\left(\frac{\partial u}{\partial x} + \frac{\partial v}{\partial y}\right),$$
where h is the perturbation of the fluid depth from its uniform resting value H, f is the constant Coriolis parameter, and g is the gravitational acceleration. The frequency comparisons below take $f > 0$. They replaced only the space derivatives by differences, leaving "the time-change terms in differential form". Each grid then gives semi-discrete equations, continuous in time and discrete in space:

Semi-discrete shallow-water equations on each grid
Grid	$\partial u/\partial t$	$\partial v/\partial t$	$\partial h/\partial t$
A	$fv - \frac{g}{d}\overline{\delta_x h}^{\,x}$	$-fu - \frac{g}{d}\overline{\delta_y h}^{\,y}$	$-\frac{H}{d}\left(\overline{\delta_x u}^{\,x} + \overline{\delta_y v}^{\,y}\right)$
B	$fv - \frac{g}{d}\overline{\delta_x h}^{\,y}$	$-fu - \frac{g}{d}\overline{\delta_y h}^{\,x}$	$-\frac{H}{d}\left(\overline{\delta_x u}^{\,y} + \overline{\delta_y v}^{\,x}\right)$
C	$f\overline{v}^{\,xy} - \frac{g}{d}\delta_x h$	$-f\overline{u}^{\,xy} - \frac{g}{d}\delta_y h$	$-\frac{H}{d}\left(\delta_x u + \delta_y v\right)$
D	$f\overline{v}^{\,xy} - \frac{g}{d}\overline{\delta_x h}^{\,xy}$	$-f\overline{u}^{\,xy} - \frac{g}{d}\overline{\delta_y h}^{\,xy}$	$-\frac{H}{d}\left(\overline{\delta_x u}^{\,xy} + \overline{\delta_y v}^{\,xy}\right)$
E	$fv - \frac{g}{d^*}\delta_x h$	$-fu - \frac{g}{d^*}\delta_y h$	$-\frac{H}{d^*}\left(\delta_x u + \delta_y v\right)$

On the E grid the differences are taken between points a distance $d^*/2$ to either side, where $d^* = \sqrt{2}d$.

== Inertia–gravity waves ==
Arakawa and Lamb judged each of the five grids by how it represents inertia–gravity waves, which carry energy away from a disturbance while the fluid adjusts to geostrophic balance.

=== Dispersion relation ===
For waves of the form
$$(u, v, h) = \left(\hat u, \hat v, \hat h\right) e^{i(kx + ly - \nu t)},$$
with wavenumbers $k$ and $l$ and frequency $\nu$, each derivative in the shallow-water equations becomes a factor: $\partial / \partial t$ becomes $-i \nu$, $\partial / \partial x$ becomes $ik$, and $\partial / \partial y$ becomes $il$. The equations then reduce to three algebraic equations for the amplitudes,
$$\begin{aligned}
-i\nu\hat u - f\hat v + igk\hat h &= 0 \\
f\hat u - i\nu\hat v + igl\hat h &= 0 \\
iHk\hat u + iHl\hat v - i\nu\hat h &= 0
\end{aligned}$$
which have a solution other than zero only if their determinant vanishes
$$\nu\left[\nu^2 - f^2 - gH\left(k^2 + l^2\right)\right] = 0.$$
The root $\nu = 0$ is a steady flow in geostrophic balance. The other two solutions are inertia–gravity waves, with
$$\nu^2 = f^2 + gH\left(k^2 + l^2\right).$$
On the positive-frequency branch, the frequency increases with the total wavenumber $K = \sqrt{k^2+l^2}$. The group velocity is nonzero for nonzero wavenumber, allowing the waves to carry energy away during geostrophic adjustment. The radius of deformation $\lambda = \sqrt{gH}/f$ sets the characteristic length scale of the adjustment.

=== On the grids ===
The same substitution can be made in each grid's semi-discrete equations, with each variable sampled at its own points. A difference $\delta_x$ then multiplies the wave by $2i\sin(kd/2)$, and an average in x multiplies by $\cos(kd/2)$. For example, the difference across two intervals on the A grid gives $i\sin(kd)/d$ whereas the derivative gives $ik$.

On the C grid, the pressure gradient and the divergence are single differences, and the Coriolis terms are averages over four points. Its three equations are therefore those above with $(2/d)\sin(kd/2)$ instead of $k$, $(2/d)\sin(ld/2)$ instead of $l$, and $f\cos(kd/2)\cos(ld/2)$ instead of $f$ in the Coriolis terms. Their determinant then gives the dispersion relation
$$\left(\frac{\nu}{f}\right)^2 = \cos^2\left(\frac{kd}{2}\right) \cos^2\left(\frac{ld}{2}\right) + 4\left(\frac{\lambda}{d}\right)^2 \left[\sin^2\left(\frac{kd}{2}\right) + \sin^2\left(\frac{ld}{2}\right)\right].$$
Each of the other grids gives its relation in the same way, from its own differences and averages. For waves much longer than the grid spacing, every grid's relation tends to the exact one.

=== In one dimension ===
Frequency ν/f of inertia–gravity waves traveling along one axis of grids A–D, against the wavenumber kd/π, compared with the exact frequency, for a radius of deformation λ of 2d (left) and d/2 (right) where d is the grid spacing.

Setting $l = 0$ gives the frequencies of waves traveling along the x axis, which Arakawa and Lamb compared. Every average in the y direction then leaves the wave unchanged and every difference in y vanishes. The C grid's relation, for example, becomes
$$\left(\frac{\nu}{f}\right)^2 = \cos^2\left(\frac{kd}{2}\right) + 4\left(\frac{\lambda}{d}\right)^2 \sin^2\left(\frac{kd}{2}\right),$$
and the table gives the relation of each grid. The E grid is left out, because along an axis it behaves like the A grid but with a grid spacing of $d^*/2 = d/\sqrt{2}$ instead of $d$.

Written as a frequency in units of f, the dispersion relation on every grid depends on the wavenumber times the grid spacing, kd, and the radius of deformation measured in grid spacings, λ/d. The shortest wave that can be represented on a grid with spacing d has a wavelength of 2d and a wavenumber of π/d, so only 0 < kd < π need be considered. So kd/π runs from 0 for the longest waves to 1 for the shortest. For example, a wave four grid spacings long has kd/π = 1/2.

Frequency of inertia–gravity waves traveling along the x axis
Grid	Dispersion relation	Behavior for 0 < kd < π
Exact	$\left(\frac{\nu}{f}\right)^2 = 1 + \left(\frac{\lambda}{d}\right)^2 (kd)^2$	increases with k
A	$\left(\frac{\nu}{f}\right)^2 = 1 + \left(\frac{\lambda}{d}\right)^2 \sin^2(kd)$	increases until kd = π/2, where the group velocity is zero, then decreases; at kd = π the wave is a pure inertial oscillation
B	$\left(\frac{\nu}{f}\right)^2 = 1 + 4\left(\frac{\lambda}{d}\right)^2 \sin^2\left(\frac{kd}{2}\right)$	increases with k
C	$\left(\frac{\nu}{f}\right)^2 = \cos^2\left(\frac{kd}{2}\right) + 4\left(\frac{\lambda}{d}\right)^2 \sin^2\left(\frac{kd}{2}\right)$	increases with k if λ/d > ½ and decreases if λ/d < ½; if λ/d = 1/2, ν = f at every wavenumber and the group velocity is zero
D	$\left(\frac{\nu}{f}\right)^2 = \cos^2\left(\frac{kd}{2}\right) + \left(\frac{\lambda}{d}\right)^2 \sin^2(kd)$	increases to a maximum where (λ/d)^{2} cos(kd) = 1/4 if λ/d > ½; decreases throughout 0 < kd < π if λ/d ≤ ½; the wave with kd = π is stationary

=== In two dimensions ===
Arakawa and Lamb also plotted the frequencies of waves traveling in any direction, but did not publish the relations they derived for them. Randall published these in 1994. They depend on $ld$ as well as on $kd$ and $\lambda / d$, and with $l = 0$ we recover the one-dimensional dispersion relations of grids A to D above.

Frequency ν/f of inertia–gravity waves against the wavenumbers kd/π and ld/π, in the exact equations and on grids A–E, when the radius of deformation is 2d. Grid E arranges its points differently, so its resolvable wavenumbers in the displayed first quadrant fill a triangle.

The same when the radius of deformation is d/2. The frequency on the C grid is f for every wave along either axis, and on the D grid it falls as the wavenumber grows, to zero for the shortest waves. The B and E grids keep the maxima they have at the finer resolution.

Frequency of inertia–gravity waves traveling in any direction
Grid	Dispersion relation
Exact	$\left(\frac{\nu}{f}\right)^2 = 1 + \left(\frac{\lambda}{d}\right)^2 \left[(kd)^2 + (ld)^2\right]$
A	$\left(\frac{\nu}{f}\right)^2 = 1 + \left(\frac{\lambda}{d}\right)^2 \left[\sin^2(kd) + \sin^2(ld)\right]$
B	$\left(\frac{\nu}{f}\right)^2 = 1 + 4\left(\frac{\lambda}{d}\right)^2 \left[\sin^2\left(\frac{kd}{2}\right) \cos^2\left(\frac{ld}{2}\right) + \cos^2\left(\frac{kd}{2}\right) \sin^2\left(\frac{ld}{2}\right)\right]$
C	$\left(\frac{\nu}{f}\right)^2 = \cos^2\left(\frac{kd}{2}\right) \cos^2\left(\frac{ld}{2}\right) + 4\left(\frac{\lambda}{d}\right)^2 \left[\sin^2\left(\frac{kd}{2}\right) + \sin^2\left(\frac{ld}{2}\right)\right]$
D	$\left(\frac{\nu}{f}\right)^2 = \cos^2\left(\frac{kd}{2}\right) \cos^2\left(\frac{ld}{2}\right) + \left(\frac{\lambda}{d}\right)^2 \left[\sin^2(kd) \cos^2\left(\frac{ld}{2}\right) + \cos^2\left(\frac{kd}{2}\right) \sin^2(ld)\right]$
E	$\left(\frac{\nu}{f}\right)^2 = 1 + 2\left(\frac{\lambda}{d}\right)^2 \left[\sin^2\left(\frac{kd}{\sqrt{2}}\right) + \sin^2\left(\frac{ld}{\sqrt{2}}\right)\right]$

On the E grid, the shortest wave along an axis has a wavelength of $\sqrt{2}d$ rather than $2d$, so $kd/\pi$ runs to $\sqrt{2}$, and in the first quadrant its resolvable wavenumbers fill the triangle $kd/\pi + ld/\pi \le \sqrt{2}$.. Its frequency is that of the B grid for the same wave turned through 45°.

== Comparing the grids ==
In one dimension the B grid is the most satisfactory, and the C grid is as good when $\lambda / d$ is sufficiently larger than 1/2. On the A and D grids, the shortest waves have group velocities of the wrong sign, so they carry energy the wrong way and solutions on these grids may be noisy.

In two dimensions, the frequency on the B grid has false maxima for waves traveling at some angles to the grid lines. The frequency on the C grid, like the exact frequency, has no false maxima when the radius of deformation is twice the grid spacing, so that no wave on the C grid then carries energy the wrong way. When the grid spacing is larger than the radius of deformation, the relation of the B grid keeps much the same shape, but that of the C grid flattens. Arakawa and Lamb concluded that the simulation of geostrophic adjustment is best with the C grid, "except for abnormal situations in which $\lambda / d$ is less than or close to 1".

These differences reflect the discrete pressure-gradient, divergence and Coriolis operators. On the A, B and D grids, the pressure-gradient approximation involves spatial averaging, which makes it insensitive to certain grid-scale height patterns. On the C and D grids, averaging the velocity components similarly suppresses the Coriolis force for certain grid-scale velocity patterns. The E grid needs no averaging for these linear terms, but its pressure-gradient and divergence operators leave two interleaved subgrids uncoupled. Waves much shorter than the radius of deformation are controlled by gravity, through the pressure gradient and the divergence, which the C grid computes over a single interval. Waves longer than the radius of deformation are controlled by the Coriolis force, which the B grid computes without averaging. For representing inertia–gravity waves with these schemes, the C grid is generally preferable when the grid spacing is much smaller than the radius of deformation, and the B grid when it is much larger. The change from one regime to the other is gradual: when the radius of deformation is between half and twice the grid spacing, the two grids perform about equally well. This comparison does not establish a universally preferable grid: the representation of other processes and the choice of numerical scheme also matter.

Which regime applies depends on the fluid. In the atmosphere, the radius of deformation is about 3000 km for the external mode, far larger than the grid spacing of any practical model, and the C grid has often been the choice for atmospheric models. In the ocean, internal (baroclinic) deformation radii are typically only tens of kilometers and were historically unresolved by many models, favoring the B grid for their representation of inertia–gravity waves. As resolution has improved, some ocean models have turned to the C grid. The radius of deformation is also much smaller for the higher vertical modes of a three-dimensional model. Randall summarized that "the C grid does well with deep, external modes but has serious problems with high internal modes, whereas the B grid has moderate problems with all modes". A model on the C grid therefore needs a horizontal resolution fine enough for its vertical resolution, and this is one reason some atmospheric models use the B or E grid.

== Geostrophic adjustment ==
Winninghoff tested the schemes on a one-dimensional problem of geostrophic adjustment that Albert Cahn had solved in 1945, in which a uniform current of finite width is set up suddenly in a fluid whose surface is level. He wrote the solution as a Fourier integral in which each wavenumber oscillates at its own frequency, and evaluated it with the frequencies of the exact equations and of each scheme. Arakawa and Lamb present the same test. In two dimensions, Winninghoff raised the height at a single grid point of his nonlinear models and followed the height there on each grid. A mound of fluid released from rest in two dimensions can be treated in the same way as Cahn's current, because the equations are linear and their Fourier modes evolve independently. The linearized equations conserve the potential vorticity
$$q = \zeta - f\frac{h}{H}$$
where
$$\zeta = \frac{\partial v}{\partial x} - \frac{\partial u}{\partial y}$$
is the vorticity. A Fourier mode of the height that starts at rest with amplitude $\hat h_0$ therefore keeps the vorticity
$$\hat\zeta = \frac{f}{H}\left(\hat h - \hat h_0\right)$$
. Differentiating the equation for $h$ with respect to time and using the other two then gives
$$\frac{d^2\hat h}{dt^2} + \nu^2\hat h = f^2\hat h_0,$$
where $\nu$ is the frequency of the inertia–gravity waves and $\nu^2 = f^2 + gHK^2$ with $K^2 = k^2 + l^2$. The solution that starts from rest is
$$\hat h(t) = \hat h_0\left[\frac{f^2}{\nu^2} + \left(1 - \frac{f^2}{\nu^2}\right)\cos(\nu t)\right].$$
The first term is the height that remains in geostrophic balance, $\hat h_0/\left(1 + \lambda^2 K^2\right)$. Features much wider than the radius of deformation keep most of their height, and much narrower ones lose most of it. The second term oscillates, and summed over all wavenumbers it is the part carried away by inertia–gravity waves.

A mound that is symmetric about its center can instead be built from circular modes, $J_0(Kr)$, where $J_0$ is a Bessel function of the first kind and $r$ is the distance from the center. A circular mode is the average of the plane waves of wavenumber $K$ traveling in every direction, and the frequency $\nu$ depends only on $K$, so a circular mode evolves in the same way as a plane wave.

The amplitudes of the circular modes in an initial height $h(r, 0)$ are given by its Hankel transform, and each then evolves as above. Horace Lamb solved the waves that spread from a symmetric disturbance on deep water in this way, with each circular mode oscillating at its own frequency; here
$$h(r, t) = \int_0^\infty \left[\frac{f^2}{\nu^2} + \left(1 - \frac{f^2}{\nu^2}\right)\cos(\nu t)\right] J_0(Kr)\,K\,dK \int_0^\infty h(r', 0)\,J_0(Kr')\,r'\,dr'.$$
For a Gaussian mound of height $h_0$ and width $\sigma$,
$$h(r, 0) = h_0 e^{-r^2/2\sigma^2},$$
the inner integral is $h_0\sigma^2 e^{-\sigma^2K^2/2}$, and
$$h(r, t) = h_0\sigma^2\int_0^\infty e^{-\sigma^2K^2/2}\left[\frac{f^2}{\nu^2} + \left(1 - \frac{f^2}{\nu^2}\right)\cos(\nu t)\right]J_0(Kr)\,K\,dK.$$

A narrow mound of fluid released from rest, adjusting to geostrophic balance, simulated on the five grids beside the exact solution, when the radius of deformation is 2d. Inertia–gravity waves carry part of the mound away, and a balanced vortex remains. The C grid comes closest to the exact solution. On the A and D grids much of the wave energy stays near the mound. The dashed circles show how far the fastest waves of the exact equations can have traveled. Below: the height at the center of the mound.

The same simulation when the radius of deformation is d/2. The waves on the C grid hardly move away from the mound, whose height keeps oscillating, while the B and E grids come closest to the exact solution. On the D grid, waves along the grid lines pass beyond the dashed circle.

== Related grids ==
Models also stagger their variables in the vertical. Most define the vertical velocity at the boundaries between layers (vertical cell faces) and the other variables in the middle of the layers, an arrangement introduced by Edward Lorenz in 1960. The Lorenz grid allows a spurious computational mode in the temperature. The grid introduced by Jule Charney and Norman Phillips in 1953, with the temperature at the layer boundaries, does not have this spurious mode. The Charney–Phillips grid gives slightly more accurate wave propagation, while energy is easier to conserve on the Lorenz grid.

Other arrangements avoid some of the weaknesses of the five grids. The Z grid, proposed by David Randall in 1994, predicts the vorticity and the divergence instead of the two velocity components, and defines them at the same points as the height. It needs no averaging, and its inertia–gravity waves behave well whatever the value of $\lambda / d$. But then the velocity must be recovered by solving Poisson equations at every time step.

The C–D grid of Adcroft, Hill and Marshall takes the C grid and adds a second set of velocity components placed as on the D grid, so that the Coriolis terms need no averaging. It removes the C grid's noise at coarse resolution, at the cost of twice as many velocity variables.

Variables can be staggered in the same ways on the hexagonal, triangular, and other polygonal grids that some global models use to cover the sphere. C grids on such meshes can keep most of the desirable properties of the C grid on a rectangular mesh if the mesh has an orthogonal dual, such as a Voronoi diagram and its Delaunay triangulation, but triangular and hexagonal C grids also support spurious computational modes. The Model for Prediction Across Scales, for example, uses a C grid on a centroidal Voronoi mesh of mostly hexagonal cells.

== See also ==
- Finite-difference time-domain method – a method of computational electromagnetics whose Yee lattice staggers the components of the electric and magnetic fields
- Advection scheme – the numerical treatment of transport by the flow in the same models
