= HyCOM =

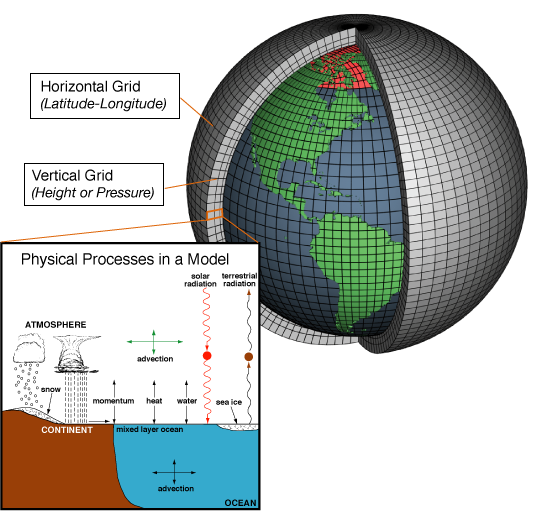
Example of a gridded numerical modeling system. HyCOM uses mainly the ocean portion of what is shown in this example.

The Hybrid Coordinate Ocean Model (HyCOM) is an open-source ocean general circulation modeling system. HyCOM is a primitive equation type of ocean general circulation model. The vertical levels of this modeling system are slightly different from other models, because the vertical coordinates remain isopycnic in the open stratified ocean, smoothly transitioning to z-level coordinates in the weakly stratified upper-ocean mixed layer, to terrain-following sigma coordinates in shallow water regions, and back to z-level coordinates in very shallow water. Therefore, the setup is a “hybrid” between z-level and terrain-following vertical levels. In the horizontal, HyCOM uses the Arakawa C-grid. HyCOM outputs are provided online for the global ocean at a spatial resolution of 0.08 degrees (approximately 9 km) from 2003 to present. HyCOM uses netCDF data format for model outputs.

== Applications ==
HyCOM model experiments are used to study the interactions between the ocean and atmosphere, including short-term and long-term processes. This modeling system has also been used to create forecasting tools. For example, HyCOM has been used to:

- Assimilate data and provide operational oceanographic forecasting for the United States Navy
- Determine the ideal way to parametrize how the sun heats the upper ocean (solar radiation and heat flux) in darker waters like the Black Sea
- Study mesoscale variability in sea surface height and temperature in the Gulf of Mexico
- Simulate drifting patterns of loggerhead sea turtles of the North American east coast
- Predict the extent of Arctic sea ice for naval operations

== See also ==
- Climate model
- Computational geophysics
- General circulation model (GCM)
- Ocean general circulation model (OGCM)
- Oceanography
- List of ocean circulation models
- Physical oceanography
- ROMS
- Sigma coordinate system
