= Climate Forecast System (NCEP) =

Weather prediction and a climate model

The Climate Forecast System or coupled forecast system (CFS) is a medium to long range numerical weather prediction and a climate model run by the National Centers for Environmental Prediction (NCEP) to bridge weather and climate timescales. Version 2 became operational as CFSv2 in 2011.

The Climate Forecast System (CFS) models global interactions between Earth’s atmosphere, land, and oceans. The model generates hourly data with a 0.5-degree horizontal resolution – which is approximately 56 kilometers. CFS integrates observations from several data sources, such as upper air balloon, surface, satellite, and aircraft observations.

== Historical CF Systems ==
CFS Reanalysis (CFSR): January 1, 1979 – March 31, 2011

The CFSR was created with the goal of producing a continuous, uniform, best-estimate record of the state of ocean-atmosphere interaction to be used in climate diagnostics and monitoring. More specifically, the CFSR was designed and executed as a high-resolution, global, coupled atmosphere-ocean-land surface-sea ice system, accurately estimating the state of these coupled domains. While operational, the reanalysis method enabled the model’s software to remain constant. This system has been extended as an operation real-time product.

Calibration:

     Monthly Means (1982-2010, 1999-2010):    Mean, Standard Deviation
     Time Series (1982-2010):    Mean for All Variables, Standard Deviation for All Variables
     Time Series (1999-2010):    Mean for All Variables, Standard Deviation for All Variables

CFS Reforecasts: December 12, 1981 – March 2011, January 1, 1999 – March 31, 2011

This CFS model generated a reforecast of past weather forecasts to aid scientists in better comprehending the model’s ability to create accurate weather forecasts. Reforecasts were initialized using CFSR data, which best estimated initial conditions from the assimilation of observational data into the CFS model.

Calibration:

     9-Month Runs Time Series (1982-2010, 1999-2010):    Mean and Standard Deviation by Variable
     9-Month Runs (1982-2010):      FLXF Mean and Standard Deviation,
                                    IPVF Mean and Standard Deviation,
                                    OCNF Mean and Standard Deviation,
                                    PGBF Mean and Standard Deviation
     9-Month Runs (1999 - 2010):    FLXF Mean and Standard Deviation,
                                    IPVF Mean and Standard Deviation,
                                    OCNF Mean and Standard Deviation,
                                    OCNH Mean and Standard Deviation,
                                    PGBF Mean and Standard Deviation
     45 and 90-Day Runs Time Series (1999-2010):    Mean by Variable, Standard Deviation by Variable

Jointly, the CFSR and CFS reforecast data are known as the Climate Forecast System Reanalysis and Reforecast (CFSRR).

CFS, version 1 (CFSv1): August 2004 – September 2012

This system was the first fully coupled, quasi-global atmosphere-ocean-land model used for seasonal prediction at NCEP. The CFSv1 was replaced by the CFSv2 in March 2011, then officially decommissioned in late September of 2012.

== Operational vs. Historical CFS ==
A coupled reanalysis from the CFSR offered initial conditions, enabling a comprehensive reforecast from 1982 to 2010. This also allowed the CFSv2 to produce stable and consistent calibrations, with skill estimates for operational seasonal and subseasonal predictions at NCEP.

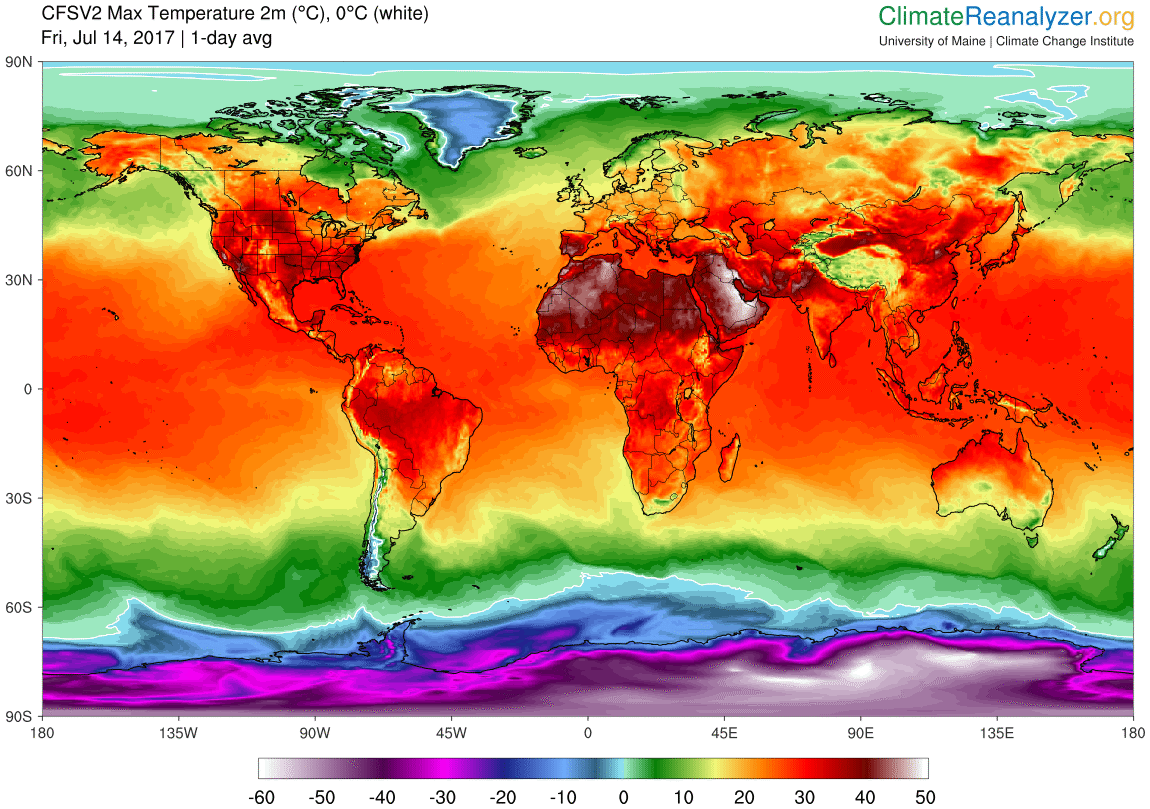
2m Temperature Forecast from the CFSv2 on July 14, 2017

Thus, the CFSv2 is considered an upgrade in nearly all aspects of the forecast model components and data assimilation of the system. The operation implementation of the entire system guarantees continuity of the climate record, also providing an up-to-date dataset to study various aspects of predictability on the seasonal and subseasonal scales. Assessments of the reforecasts reflect increases in the length of skillful MJO forecasts, for the CFSv2, from 6 to 17 days; – a significant improvement upon subseasonal forecasts – dramatically enhances global SST forecasts; and almost doubles the skill of seasonal forecasts of 2-m temperatures across the United States in comparison to the proceeding system. The CFSv2 offers tremendously enhanced guidance at these time scales and produces many more products for seasonal and subseasonal forecasting with a comprehensive set of retrospective forecasts, so that users may calibrate their forecast products. Such real-time and retrospective operational forecasts are employed by an array of users for decision-making processes in various field and applications, including seasonal prediction of the hurricane season.

The CFSv2 has enhancements in the two data assimilation systems and two forecast models used to develop the CFSv1. Further, the CFSv2 was developed to include an interactive three-layer sea ice model, improved four-level soil model, and historically prescribed CO2 concentrations. Significantly, this model was created as an upgrade in consistency between initial states and model states developed by the data assimilation system.

== Operation ==
The CFSv2 retrospective forecasts have initial conditions taken from the CFSR. Initial conditions for the real-time operational forecasts are obtained from version 2 of the real-time operational Climate Data Assimilation System (CDASv2). Carefully, CDASv2 and CFSR were unified in terms of the same cutoff times for data input of the ocean, land surface, and atmosphere attributes of the data assimilation system. Thus, compared to CFSv1, – which lagged by a few days – CFSv2 has greater utility of the new system, since its initial conditions are created entirely in real-time. This means it is possible to use them for subseasonal forecasts, ranging from week 1 to 6.

== Accuracy ==
=== Subseasonal ===
For the CFSv2, the BAC remains above the 0.5 level for two to three weeks, compared to one week in the CFSv1. Correlations were calculated as a function of lead per starting day, with only 11 cases for each lead and one case per year. To suppress noise, a light smoothing was applied over adjacent starting days.

Both systems seem to gain about 2 to 3 days of prediction skill through application of systematic error correlation (SEC). Note, data assimilation and model enhancements from 1995 to 2010 count for much more than availability of hindcasts, but the latter correspond to some years of model improvement.

=== Seasonal Prediction ===
Skill for the CFSv2 is enhanced, overall, in the extratropics, having an average anomaly correlation poleward of 20 degrees North and 20 degrees South of 0.27(0.34) for 6-month lead (3-month lead) in comparison to the CFSv1, with anomaly correlation of 0.24(0.31).

In the tropical Pacific, the CFSv2 skill is moderately lower than the prior system for NH winter target periods, but with less of a summer and spring minimum. Such a lower skill of the CFSv2 in DJF is correlated to the climatology shift, having measurably warmer mean predicted SST after 1999 than before 1999, in the tropical Pacific. This likely results from the start of assimilating the Advanced Microwave Sounding Unit (AMSU) satellite observations in the initial conditions of CFSR for 1999.

Diagnostics

Systematic error is estimated as the difference in observed and predicted climatology over the common period from 1982 to 2009. Given the three parameters of precipitation rate (prate), SST, and 2-m air temperature (T2m), the CFSv2 has lower root-mean-square (rms) values, an absolute sign of an improved model. Decreased rms values, on a global scale, do not preclude certain areas possessing a greater systematic error. For instance, cold bias over the eastern United States is stronger for the CFSv2.

== Overview ==
CFSv2 is run once daily at NCEP, at multiple time scales. The medium-range model forecasts in one-week intervals out to four weeks, while the longer-range scale forecasts on three-month moving averages out some nine months. The shorter scale has some overlap with the Global Forecast System, NAVGEM and FIM models (among several other medium-range models) that the US government runs for operational forecast purposes.

"Coupled" refers to the fact that the model couples atmospheric to oceanic modeling. Its forecasts are derived from a 16-member ensemble, with each member initialized on a lead of several days of conditions. The CFSv2 offers output that can be masked to suppress forecasts made with insufficient skill.

Among the variables made available to the public include precipitation and surface temperature (both of which are available both on a global spatial scale and a continental one), winds at 200 and 850 hectopascals (hPa), and heights at 500 hPa (all of which are available only at the global or hemispheric scale). Output is rendered as deviation from normal.

== Accessing the Data ==
Operational real-time CFS model data is accessible through the CFS 7-day rotating archive on NCEP servers. Historical, near-real-time data is available through NCEI from the CFS operational forecasts and analysis.

== Affiliation ==
National Oceanic and Atmospheric Administration (NOAA):

- The CFS model is produced under the guidance of the National Centers for Environmental Prediction (NCEP).
- Data for the CFSR was developed by the National Centers for Environmental Prediction (NCEP).
- The NCEP servers provide real-time data through the CFS 7-day rotating archive.
- The National Centers for Environmental Information (NCEI) offers access to the near-real-time historical model data.

== See also ==
- Model for prediction across scales (MPAS)
- Community Earth System Model (CESM)
