= Homer A. McCrerey =

American meteorologist / Bioneer / Mentor

Homer Alex McCrerey (July 29, 1919 – 1999) became U.S. Navy Meteorologist and oceanographer for CINCPACFLT until 1972.

== Biography ==
US Navy Captain McCrerey was born in Hiawatha, Brown County, Kansas. During 1941 he graduated from Baker University in Baldwin City, Kansas with a mathematics degree. Homer was commissioned at the US Naval Academy in 1942. He completed Naval Postgraduate School in 1952. For over 20 years, he advanced both the art and science of computer-aided mathematical modeling that improved global weather forecasting.

He served in the Navy during World War II as ship's engineer on USS Strive and later as a meteorologist in the Naval Weather Service. He served as commanding officer of Fleet Weather Central at several posts. He was decorated nine times during his 31-year career and received a United Nations Service Medal and a National Defense Service Medal.

During his tour with CINCPACFLT while based at Pearl Harbor, Hawaii, McCrerey collaborated with Mid-Pacific Ocean near-peer mentors to help ensure effective NASA Apollo Program Command Capsule Recoveries coordinated by Pacific Recovery Forces (CTF 130).

== See also ==
- Bioneering
- Military meteorology
- CTF 130 (Apollo Capsule Recoveries)
- David C. Richardson (admiral)
- CDC 1604 at FOCCPAC Kunia, Hawaii
- Keyhole Markup Language (Wx data formatting)

Navy Operational Global Atmospheric Prediction System

- SYNOP (Shipboard surface weather conditions)
- University of Kansas#Computing_innovations
- The Blue Marble (Pathfinders to the Stars)
