= Military meteorology =

Meteorology applied to military purposes

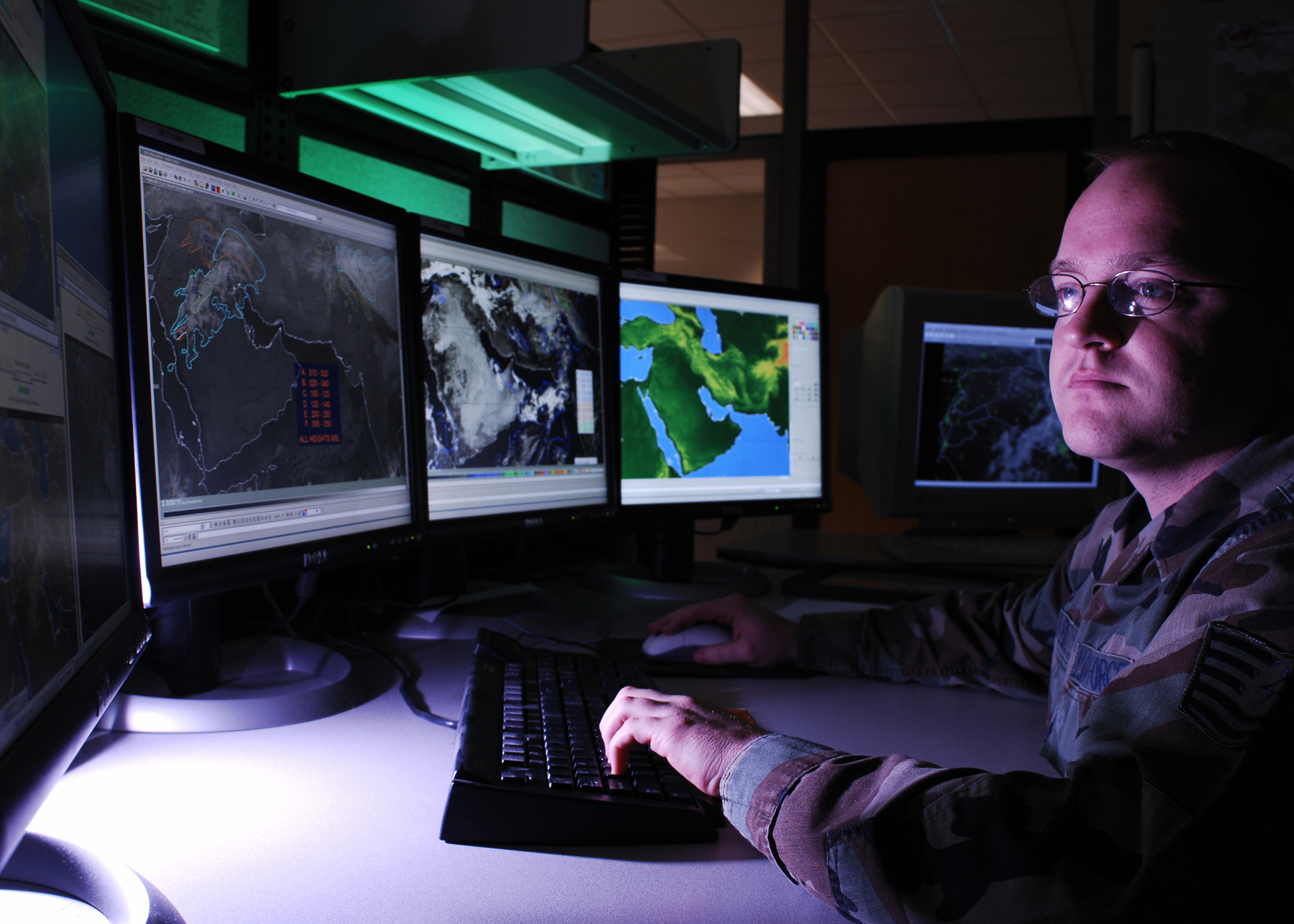
Military weather specialist in US

Military meteorology is meteorology applied to military purposes, by armed forces or other agencies. It is one of the most common fields of employment for meteorologists.

World War II brought great advances in meteorology as large-scale military land, sea, and air campaigns were highly dependent on weather, particularly forecasts provided by the Royal Navy, Met Office and USAAF for the Normandy landing and strategic bombing.

University meteorology departments grew rapidly as the military services sent cadets to be trained as weather officers. Wartime technological developments such as radar also proved to be valuable meteorological observing systems. More recently, the use of satellites in space has contributed extensively to military meteorology.

Military meteorologists currently operate with a wide variety of military units, from aircraft carriers to special forces.

== Military meteorology in the United States ==
=== United States Navy/Marine Corps ===
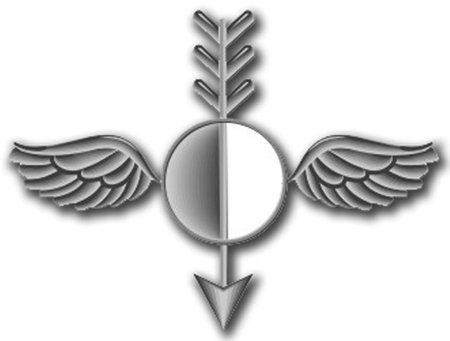
U.S. Navy Aerographer's Mate Rating insignia

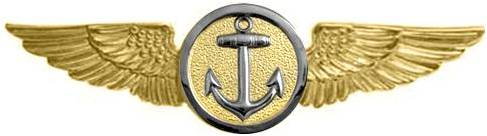
U.S. Navy Flight Meteorologist insignia

==== Chain of command ====
- Naval Meteorology and Oceanography Command
  - Fleet Numerical Meteorology and Oceanography Center

==== Enlisted ====
Enlisted meteorology and oceanography forecasters are called aerographer's mates.

==== Officer ====
Naval meteorology and oceanography (METOC) officers are line officers performing information warfare duties and are members of the broader Information Warfare Community.

== Notable military meteorologists ==
- Capt Homer A. McCrerey, USNA Class of 1942, fleet meteorologist and oceanographer(1967–1972)
- Gp Capt James Martin Stagg, military meteorologist for Operation Overlord 1944

== See also ==
U.S. Air Force Basic Meteorologist badge

- Weather events during wars
- U.S. Air Force 557th Weather Wing
- U.S. Air Force Special Operations Weather Technician
- Navy Global Environmental Model
- Weather forecasting for Operation Overlord
