= Climate Prediction Center =

United States federal weather agency

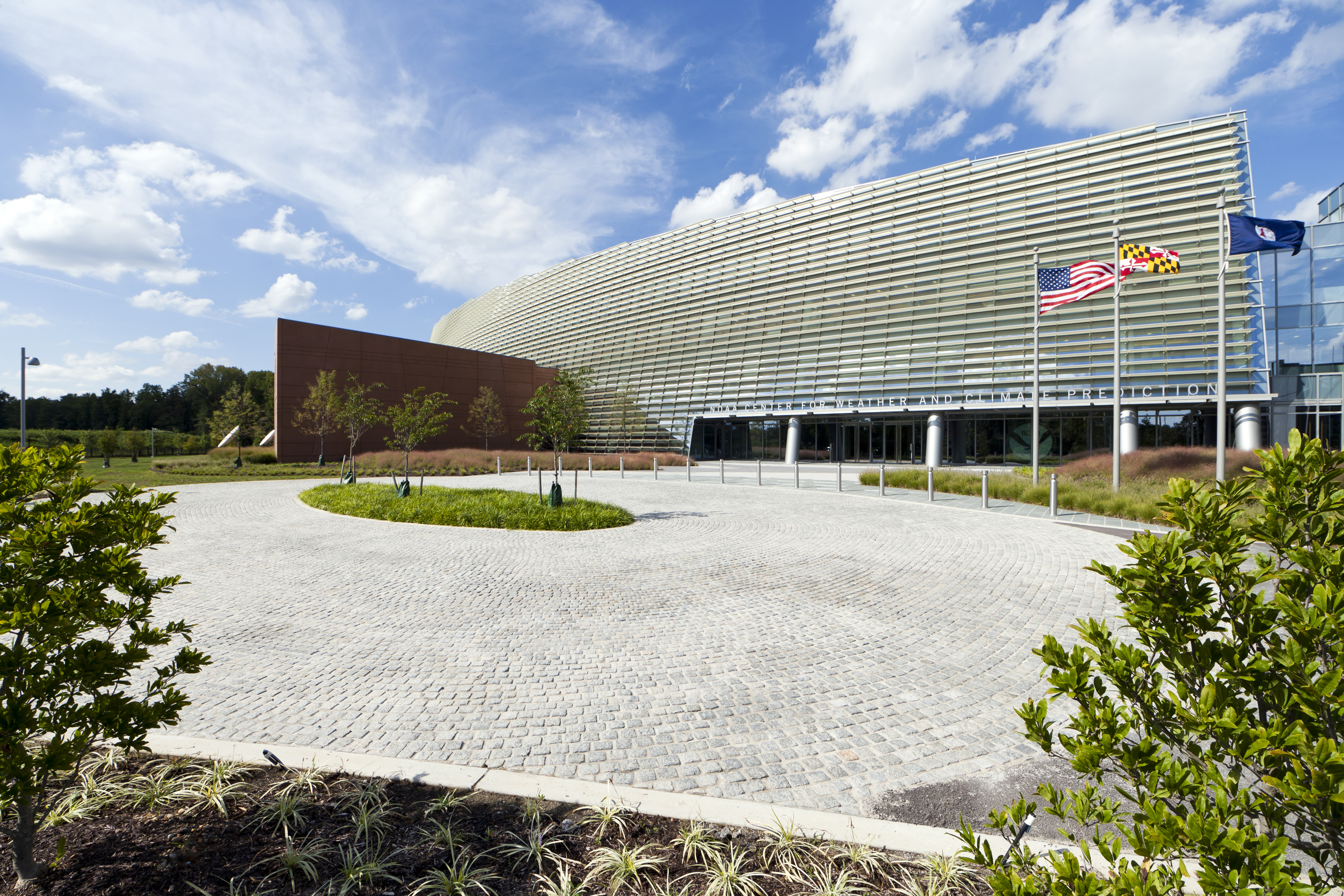

Agency overview
- Formed: 1995; 31 years ago
- Preceding agencies: Climate Analysis Center; Weather Bureau Climate and Crop Services
- Jurisdiction: US Federal Government
- Headquarters: College Park, Maryland, United States
- Parent department: Department of Commerce
- Parent agency: National Centers for Environmental Prediction
- Website: cpc.ncep.noaa.gov

The Climate Prediction Center (CPC) is a United States federal agency that is one of the National Centers for Environmental Prediction, which are a part of the National Oceanic and Atmospheric Administration's National Weather Service. CPC is headquartered in College Park, Maryland. Its roots trace back to the climatological work of Thomas Jefferson, with the United States Army Signal Corp taking over responsibility of the climate program in the late 19th century. Once it became part of the United States Weather Bureau, it was known as the Weather Bureau Climate and Crop Services. From 1957 through 1966, the United States Weather Bureau's Office of Climatology, located in Washington, D.C., and then Suitland, Maryland, published the Mariners Weather Log publication. Late in the 20th century, it was known as the Climate Analysis Center for a time, before evolving into CPC in 1995. CPC issues climate forecasts valid for weeks and months in advance.

== History ==
The roots of modern climate prediction can be traced to the work of one of the nation's first applied climatologists, Thomas Jefferson, third President of the United States. A century later, the federal government assigned to the Army Signal Corps the mission to define the climate of the regions of the country being opened for farming.

In 1890, the United States Department of Agriculture (USDA) created the Weather Bureau climate and crops services which began publishing the Weather and Crops Weekly Bulletin, which the CPC in conjunction with the USDA still publishes today. The records of the Climate Division span from 1883 to 1961. For a time during the 1960s, the Weather Bureau's Office of Climatology was located in Suitland, Maryland.

In 1970, various federal weather and climate functions were consolidated into the National Weather Service (NWS) and placed in a new agency called the National Oceanic and Atmospheric Administration (NOAA). In the 1980s the National Weather Service established the Climate Prediction Center, known at the time as the Climate Analysis Center (CAC). The CPC is best known for its United States climate forecasts based on El Niño and La Niña conditions in the tropical Pacific.

== Products ==
This visualization showcases the five weather satellites that create NOAA's Climate Prediction Center (CPC) products. The five geosynchronous satellites are: GOES-13, GOES-15, Meteosat-7, Meteosat-9 and MTSAT-2.

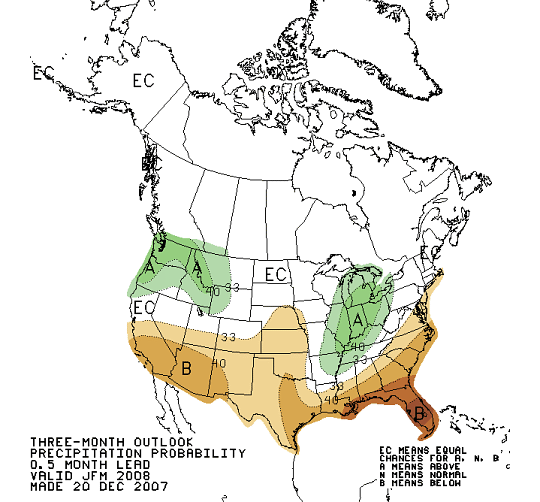
Sample CPC graphic: three month precipitation outlook

The CPC's products are operational predictions of climate variability, real-time monitoring of global climate, and attribution of the origins of major climate anomalies. The products cover time scales from a week to seasons, and cover the land, the ocean, and the atmosphere, extending into the stratosphere.

These climate services are available for users in government, the public and private industry, both in this country and abroad. Applications include the mitigation of weather-related natural disasters and uses for social and economic good in agriculture, energy, transportation, water resources, and health. Continual product improvements are supported through diagnostic research, increasing use of models, and interactions with user groups. Some specific products include:

- 3-Month Temperature and Precipitation
  - Outlooks
  - Discussions
- 1-Month Temperature and Precipitation
  - Outlooks
  - Discussions
- 6 to 10-Day and 8 to 14-Day Products
  - Temperature and Precipitation Anomaly
  - Excessive Heat Outlook
  - Maximum Heat Index Prediction
- 3-Month probability of exceedance
  - Temperature
  - Precipitation
  - Heating and Cooling Degree Days
- Hurricane Season Outlook
  - Atlantic basin
  - Pacific basin
- U.S. Drought
  - Outlook
  - Discussion
- International Support
  - Weekly Afghan Hazards
  - Weekly Africa Hazards
  - Weekly Central America Hazards
  - Weekly Haiti Hazards

== See also ==
- National Climatic Data Center
- Climatology
- Coupled Forecast System
