= Richard Rood =

Richard Rood may refer to:

- Richard Rood (wrestler), professional wrestler known as Rick Rude
- Richard Rood (violinist) (born 1955), American violinist
- Richard B. Rood, atmospheric scientist
- Dick Rude (born 1964), actor and director
