= Flow-following, finite-volume Icosahedral Model =

Experimental numerical weather prediction model

The Flow-following, finite-volume Icosahedral Model (FIM) is an experimental numerical weather prediction model that was developed at the Earth System Research Laboratories in the United States from 2008 to 2016.

The FIM was developed as a candidate to eventually supplant the Global Forecast System, the United States's current medium-range forecast model. The FIM was originally slated to become operational some time in 2014 but never did so. The model produces similar results to the GFS, but runs slower on the NWS's operational computers. Its three-part name derives from its key features: "flow-following" indicates that its vertical coordinates are based on both terrain and potential temperature (isentropic sigma coordinates, previously used in the now-discontinued rapid update cycle model), and "finite-volume" describes the method used for calculating horizontal transport. The "icosahedral" portion describes the model's most uncommon feature: whereas most grid-based forecast models have historically used rectangular grid points (a less than ideal arrangement for a planet that is a slightly oblate spheroid), the FIM instead fits Earth to a Goldberg polyhedron with icosahedral symmetry, with twelve evenly spaced pentagons (including two at the poles) anchoring a grid of hexagons.

In November 2016, the ESRL announced it was no longer pursuing the FIM as a replacement for the GFS and would be instead developing the FV3, which uses some of the FIM's principles except on a square grid. The FIM will continue to be run for experimental purposes until FV3 commences. The FIM will also be upgraded with some of the same features as FV3 (retaining the icosahedral grid) and coupling to examine the use of the model in the longer ranges.

The FIM runs as a multiscale model, with a suffix number indicating the model's horizontal resolution. FIM7 operates at a spatial resolution of approximately 60 km, FIM8 at 30 km, FIM9 at 15 km and FIM9.5 at 10 km. Each scale runs on a temporal resolution of 6-hour steps. As of 2017, only the FIM7 (running out 10 days) and FIM8 (running out 14 days) continue to be run daily. The FIM7 also runs four runs between Tuesday and Wednesday each week as a climate model, with the mean output from those runs issued in one-week intervals; it thus complements the Climate Forecast System, the only other model in the U.S. government's arsenal that covers that time frame.
