= Sigma level =

Sigma level may refer to a:

- measurement of defects in the Six Sigma business management strategy
- atmospheric pressure measured in a sigma coordinate system
