= John Marshall (oceanographer) =

British oceanographer and academic

John Charles Marshall, FRS is a British oceanographer and academic. He is the Cecil and Ida Green Professor of Oceanography in the Department of Earth, Atmospheric and Planetary Sciences at the Massachusetts Institute of Technology (MIT). He is also an adjunct senior research scientist in the Department of Applied Physics and Applied Mathematics at Columbia University.

== Life ==
Marshall holds degrees in physics and atmospheric science from Imperial College, London, where he was a faculty member in the Physics Department. Marshall joined MIT in 1991, and has worked there ever since.

Marshall studies the circulation of the ocean, its coupling to the atmosphere and the role of the oceans in climate. Specific research interests include ocean convection and thermohaline circulation, ocean gyres and circumpolar currents, geophysical fluid dynamics, climate dynamics and numerical modeling of ocean and atmosphere.

He is the author or coauthor of over 150 refereed publications covering a wide range of topics in atmosphere, ocean and climate dynamics. He is perhaps best known for his work on ocean convection, the dynamics of the southern ocean and as the architect of the MIT General Circulation Model (MITgcm), an open-source numerical model used by a broad community of researchers around the world.

== Awards ==
- 1985: L.F. Richardson Prize of the Royal Meteorological Society
- 2004: Adrian Gill Prize of the Royal Meteorological Society
- 2008: Elected a Fellow of the Royal Society
- 2014: Elected a Fellow of the American Meteorological Society
- 2014: Sverdrup Gold Medal Award of the American Meteorological Society
- 2020: A.G. Huntsman Award for Excellence in the Marine Sciences
