= Navy Operational Global Atmospheric Prediction System =

Numerical Weather Modelling Simulations

The Navy Operational Global Atmospheric Prediction System (NOGAPS) is a global numerical weather prediction computer model run by the United States Navy's Fleet Numerical Meteorology and Oceanography Center. It evolved from a version of the third-generation UCLA general circulation model, which used the Arakawa C-grid, after that model was exported in the mid-1970s to the Navy's Environmental Prediction Research Facility and Fleet Numerical Oceanographic Center in Monterey, California. This mathematical model was run four times a day and produced weather forecasts. The NOGAPS was replaced by the NAVGEM in February 2013.
