= Whole Atmosphere Community Climate Model =

The Whole Atmosphere Community Climate Model (WACCM) is used to generate computer simulations of the dynamic processes interacting between the terrestrial and solar systems that impact on Earth's climate. The original model was developed around the turn of the millennium with the most recent iteration, version 6 (WACCM6), released in 2019. The Whole Atmosphere Community Climate Model with thermosphere and ionosphere extension (WACCM-X) extends the model to space weather and space climate.
