= Model for Prediction Across Scales =

Mathematical Earth system model

In weather forecasting and other climate sciences, the Model for Prediction Across Scales (MPAS) is an Earth system modeling software that integrates atmospheric, oceanographic, and cryospheric modeling across scales from regional to planetary. It includes climate and weather modeling and simulations that were used initially by researchers in 2013. The atmospheric models were created by the Earth System Laboratory at the National Center for Atmospheric Research and the oceanographic models were created by the Climate, Ocean, and Sea Ice Modeling Group at Los Alamos National Laboratory. The atmospheric model is discretized on centroidal Voronoi meshes, which are nominally hexagonal, with a C-grid staggering of its prognostic variables. The software has been used to model real-time weather as well as seasonal forecasting of convection, tornadoes and tropical cyclones. The atmospheric modeling component of the software can be used with other atmospheric modeling software including the Weather Research and Forecasting Model, the Global Forecast System, and the Community Earth System Model.

Rapid Refresh Forecast System version 2 (RRFSv2) is planned to transition the RRFS from using the Finite Volume Cubed Sphere (FV3) dynamical core (used in RRFSv1) to using the MPAS dynamical core.

== See also ==
- Tropical cyclone forecast model
- Wind wave model
- Global circulation model
