= Community Earth System Model =

Fully coupled numerical simulation of Earth systems

The Community Earth System Model (CESM) is a fully coupled numerical simulation of the Earth system consisting of atmospheric, ocean, ice, land surface, carbon cycle, and other components. CESM includes a climate model providing state-of-art simulations of the Earth's past, present, and future. It is the successor of the Community Climate System Model (CCSM), specifically version 4 (CCSMv4), which provided the initial atmospheric component for CESM. Strong ensemble forecasting capabilities, CESM-LE (CESM-Large Ensemble), were developed at the onset to control for error and biases across different model runs (realizations). Simulations from the Earth's surface through the thermosphere are generated utilizing the Whole Atmosphere Community Climate Model (WACCM). CESM1 was released in 2010 with primary development by the Climate and Global Dynamics Division (CGD) of the National Center for Atmospheric Research (NCAR), and significant funding by the National Science Foundation (NSF) and the Department of Energy (DoE).

== See also ==
- Model for Prediction Across Scales (MPAS)
