= Shian-Jiann Lin =

Taiwanese-American atmospheric scientist

- Born: 1958 (age 67–68); Taipei, Taiwan
- Education: National Taiwan University (BS); University of Oklahoma (MS); Princeton University (MA, PhD)
- Known for: Weather and Climate Model Development; FV3 Dynamical Core
- Scientific career
- Fields: Geophysical fluid dynamics
- Workplaces: Goddard Space Flight Center, Geophysical Fluid Dynamics Laboratory
- Doctoral advisor: Raymond Pierrehumbert

Shian-Jiann Lin (born 1958) is a Taiwanese-American atmospheric scientist and meteorologist. He is currently the head of the Weather and Climate Dynamics Division at the Geophysical Fluid Dynamics Laboratory, the lead developer of the GFDL Finite-Volume Cubed-Sphere Dynamical Core (FV3) and a lead developer or key contributor to several weather and climate models developed using FV3.

== Education and career ==
Lin earned a Bachelor of Science (B.S.) from National Taiwan University. He also holds a master's degree in aeronautical engineering from the University of Oklahoma and a doctorate in geophysical fluid dynamics from Princeton University. After a postdoctoral position at the Center for Analysis and Prediction of Storms at the University of Oklahoma he became a scientist at the Laboratory for Atmospheres at NASA's Goddard Space Flight Center, where he developed the Lin and Rood advection scheme, which forms the basis for the community GOCART and GEOS-Chem transport models, and the Finite-Volume (FV) Dynamical Core, which was used in earlier versions of the Goddard Earth Observing System and of the Geophysical Fluid Dynamics Laboratory Coupled Model, both since upgraded to FV3, and is still used in the second release of the Community Earth System Model.

Lin joined GFDL in 2003. He has since led development of FV3, the extension of FV onto a cubed-sphere grid, and a relaxation of the hydrostatic assumption to allow explicit simulation of vertical accelerations. A collaboration with Goddard led to the first global cloud-resolving simulations performed in the US. Lin's continued model development has led to the prediction models HiRAM and fvGFS. The latter is a prototype for the Next-Generation Global Prediction System (NGGPS), for which FV3 was selected after a two-year evaluation period. It was found that FV3 produced more accurate forecasts with better numerical stability compared to competing dynamical cores without sacrificing realism, efficiency, or effective resolution. The first operational NGGPS model, an FV3-based Global Forecast System, became operational on 12 June 2019.

In 2018 Lin was named a fellow of the American Meteorological Society.
