= David C. Richardson (admiral) =

Deputy Commander US Pacific Fleet

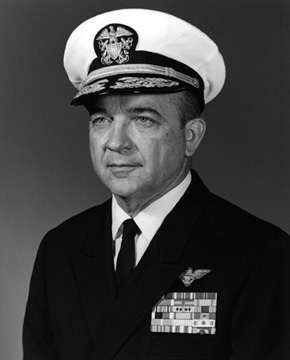
- Born: April 8, 1914; Meridian, Mississippi, United States
- Died: June 13, 2015 (aged 101); San Diego, California, United States
- Relatives: 6 children (1 deceased), 12 grandchildren, 2 great-grandchildren
- Military career
- Allegiance: United States
- Branch: United States Navy
- Service years: 1936–1972
- Rank: Vice admiral
- Commands: United States Sixth Fleet

David Charles Richardson (April 8, 1914 – June 13, 2015) was a vice admiral in the United States Navy.

He was a 1936 graduate of the United States Naval Academy.

== Post Academy Duty (1936-1945) ==
- USS Tennessee (BB-43)

Junior Officer (1936-1939)

- Naval Flight Training (1940)
- Fighter Squadron Five

=== Embarked Aboard ===
- USS Saratoga (CV-3) / USS Ranger (CV-4)
- USS Yorktown (CV-5) / USS Wasp (CV-7)
- Guadalcanal Campaign (1942)
- Tactical Aviation Training (Florida)
- Carrier Group Readiness Training (Hawaii)

== Post World War Two ==
=== Abstract from Naval Institute Oral History Project ===
Source: David C. Richardson Naval Institute Oral History Project

OODA Feedback Loop Diagram

- Royal Navy Staff College (London)
- Naval War College

Helped write analysis of wartime battles ...

- Carrier Air Group13 (CVW-13)
- Embarked aboard USS Princeton (CV-37)

Helped plan for NATO military structure ...

- USS Badoeng Strait (CVE-116)

Executive Officer (XO) (1950-1953)

== Post Korean War ==
- ComAirPac (OP-5)
- CinCSouth (Naples)

Deep Draft Command at Sea

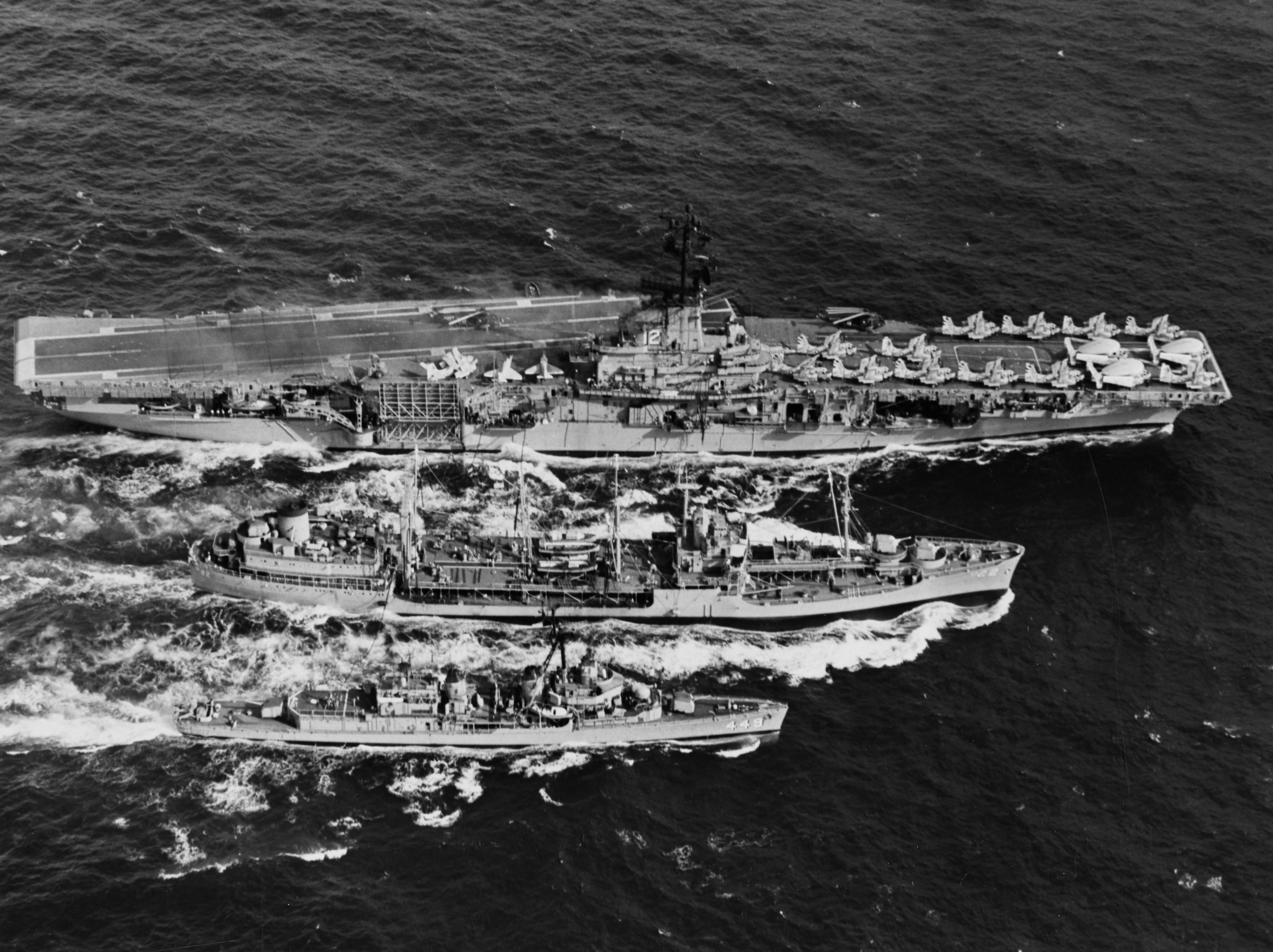
Cimarron UNREPS Hornet two years before HORNET side-swiped CIM during SEP-1968 REFTRA Exercise

USS Cimarron (AO-22)

USS Hornet (CVS-12)

- OpNav (OP-06) (1961-1964)

== Flag Officer Roles ==
- Commander Fleet Air Norfolk (1965-1966)
- Commander Task Force 77 (1966-1967)
- Assistant DCNO (Air) (1967-1968)
- Commander Sixth Fleet (1968-1970)
- Deputy CinCPacFlt (1970-1972)

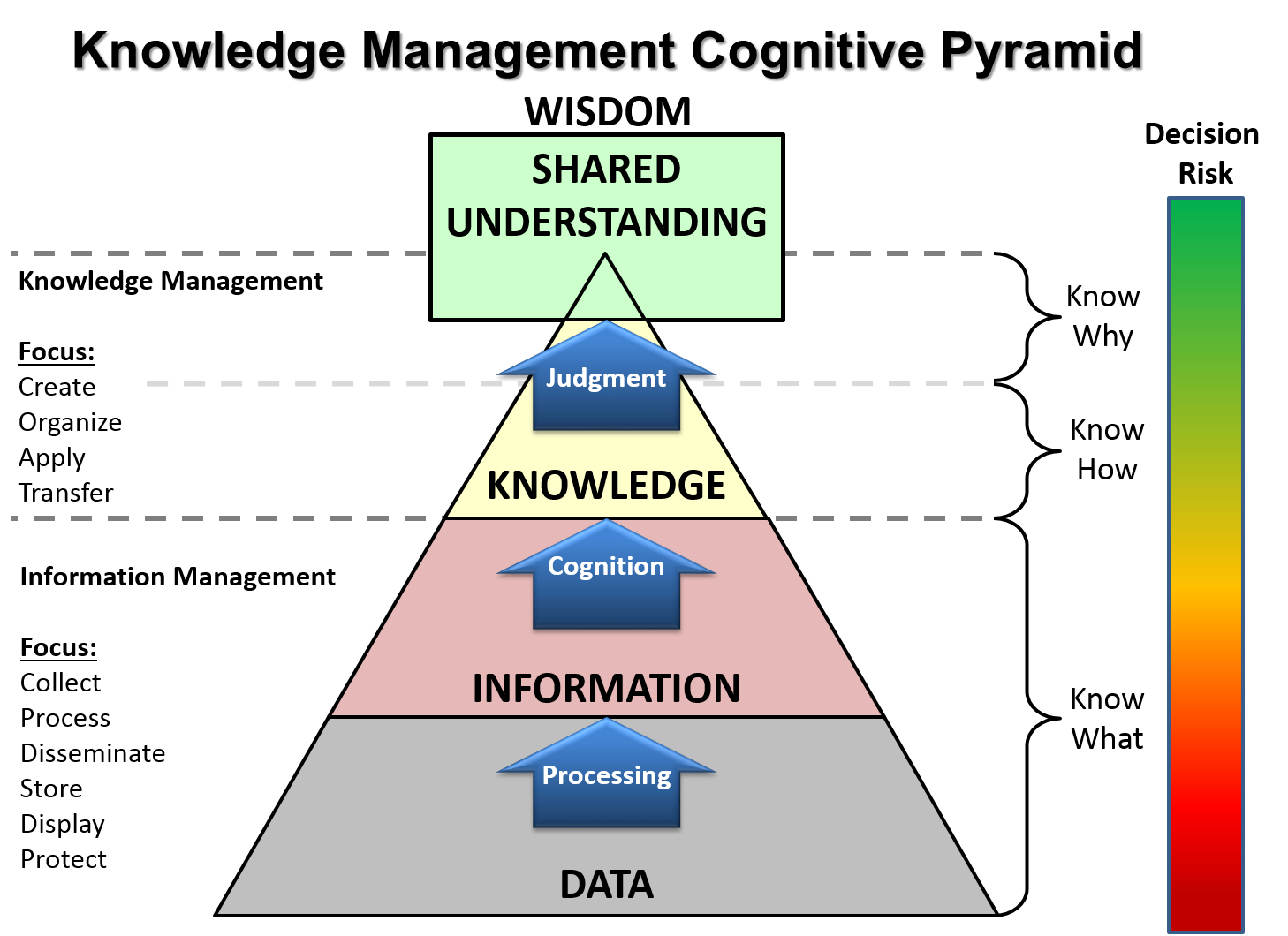
US-DoD KM-Pyramid Adaptation

As Assistant DCNO (Air) (1967-1968), he sponsored adapting a DIKW pyramid to enable copiloting a JCS-WWMCCS Sea Surveillance System. He then became Commander of the United States Sixth Fleet (August 1968 – August 1970). This tour was notable for his role in creating the Ocean Surveillance Information System (OSIS) to help monitor Soviet naval operations.

Deputy Commander US Pacific Fleet (1970 - 1972)

He directed integration of an automated Sea Surveillance System for Anti-Submarine Warfare (ASW) Naval Control and Protection of Shipping (NCAPS) into the World-Wide Command and Control System (WWMCCS).

Retired during 1972 but remained active in roles involving the US Naval Research Lab with SIMDIS. For example, see RSC-114 Class United States Navy torpedo retrievers. MarineTraffic is also an ASW-NCAPS derivative. (2007)

Also see: Global Command and Control System that replaced WWMCCS decision support system (1986).

Richardson died in 2015 at the age of 101. His wife, Jeanne M. McHugh (1923–2014), died after 59 years of marriage.

== See also ==
- Bernard A. Clarey
- Homer A. McCrerey
- Group decision-making
- Information assurance
- Keyhole Markup Language
- Mission assurance
- Pacific Disaster Center
- Proceedings (magazine)
- SOSUS Underwater Surveillance System
- United States Naval Research Laboratory
- Hawaii International Conference on System Sciences
- USS Liberty incident
