= Sigma coordinate system =

Coordinate system used in fluid dynamics

A cross-section of the atmosphere over terrain with a sigma-coordinate representation shown. Mesoscale models divide the atmosphere vertically using representations similar to the one shown here.

The sigma coordinate system is a common coordinate system used in computational models for oceanography, meteorology and other fields where fluid dynamics are relevant. This coordinate system receives its name from the independent variable $\sigma$ used to represent a scaled pressure level.

Models that use a sigma coordinate system include the Princeton Ocean Model (POM), the COupled Hydrodynamical Ecological model for REgioNal Shelf seas (COHERENS), the ECMWF Integrated Forecast System, and various other numerical weather prediction models.

== Description ==
Pressure at a height $p$ may be scaled with the surface pressure $p_0$, or less often with the pressure at the top of the defined domain $p_T$. The sigma value at the scale reference is by definition 1: i.e., if surface-scaled, $\sigma_0 = 1$.

In a sigma coordinate system, if the sigma scale is divided equally, then at every point on the surface, each horizontal layer above that point has the same thickness in terms of sigma, although in terms of metres each next higher equal sigma-thickness layer is thicker than the previous one. The sigma-thickness of each layer decreases with surface altitude, the sigma-levels being compressed together (in terms of metres) as the total vertical range is reduced.

The sigma coordinate system allows sigma-surfaces to follow model terrain; where terrain is sharply sloped, so are the sigma surfaces. This allows for continuous fields, such as temperature, to be represented especially smoothly at the lowest layers in the model. Further, with the exponential decaying nature of density within the atmosphere, sigma coordinates provide a greater vertical resolution (in terms of metres) near the surface. The sloping nature of the coordinate surfaces does require additional interpolation of the pressure gradient force, and the smoothing of terrain can often cause it to extend beyond the true boundaries of land.

== Sigma coordinate hybrids ==
=== Hybrid sigma-pressure ===
Some atmospheric models use a hybrid sigma-pressure coordinate scheme, combining sigma-denominated layers at the bottom (following terrain) with isobaric (pressure-denominated) layers aloft. The isobaric upper layers are generally more numerically tractable (since flatter), and specifically more tractable for radiative transfer calculations (important for assimilating satellite radiance observations). Some models (e.g., the 2009 NAM) have a pure sigma domain at the bottom and a fixed transition level, above which all layers are exactly isobaric. Other models (e.g., GFS) gradually transition from sigma to isobaric.

=== Hybrid sigma-density ===
Some oceanographic models uses coordinates which similarly transition from density (isopycnic) to sigma coordinates in shallow coastal shelf regions.
