= Parallel Ocean Program =

Ocean circulation model

The Parallel Ocean Program (POP) is a three-dimensional ocean circulation model designed primarily for studying the ocean climate system. The model is developed and supported primarily by researchers at the Los Angeles National Laboratory (LANL). It is based on the Bryan-Cox-Semtner models. Like the other models descended from them, it uses the Arakawa B-grid.

In 2001, the United States Navy looked into POP as a possible unit of a global ocean-atmosphere-sea ice prediction system.
