= Nucleus for European Modelling of the Ocean =

General model of ocean circulation developed by a European consortium

- NEMO logo.png

Nucleus for European Modelling of the Ocean (NEMO) is a numerical modelling framework used for research and forecasting in oceanography and climate science. It enables the simulation of ocean dynamics, sea ice, and marine biogeochemistry at a range of spatial and temporal scales. NEMO is widely used in Europe and internationally for applications including fundamental ocean research, climate studies, operational oceanography, seasonal forecasting, and climate projections.

The platform consists of three main components: NEMO-OCE, which simulates the dynamics and thermodynamics of ocean circulation; NEMO-SI3, which simulates the dynamics and thermodynamics of sea ice; and NEMO-TOP-PISCES, which models marine biogeochemical processes.

== Distribution and development ==
NEMO is freely distributed via the NEMO forge under the CeCILL license. The distribution includes the numerical model (approximately 300,000 lines of code), versioned scientific manuals with assigned DOIs describing the model's theoretical foundations, and a user guide covering installation, test cases, and advanced functionalities.

NEMO development is managed using a version control system hosted on GitLab (the "NEMO forge"), providing public access to development branches, work plans, and issue tracking. Continuous integration based on automated testing is used to ensure code quality and robustness. Major versions are typically supported for four to six years, with minor updates released every three to six months. Detailed release notes accompany each version. Users are invited to communicate with the NEMO developers via the NEMO Forum.

== Organisation and governance ==
Development is coordinated by a European consortium composed of institutions in France (CNRS–IRD–SU and Mercator Ocean), Italy (CMCC), and the United Kingdom (UK Met Office and NOC). Contributions are made by a group of approximately 30 developers, primarily from consortium institutions, corresponding to about 10 full-time equivalent staff. The System Team is coordinated by the NEMO Project Manager and advised by the Scientific Leader. Each partner institution puts forward a NEMO Officer to manage the contributions from their respective teams. Any institution wishing to join the Consortium is required to commit to dedicate a minimum of one full-time-equivalent person-year per year into the NEMO System Team's core development efforts.

The consortium defines a long-term development strategy every five years (the latest being 2023-2027). This strategy is implemented by the NEMO System Team through annual work plans with additional contributions coming from thematic working groups. These working groups are aimed at guiding development priorities within specific scientific and technical areas and coordinating developments sourced externally from the System Team. The developer's committee, led by its chair, oversees the functioning of the working groups and their contribution to the scientific and technical advancement of NEMO.

The Scientific Advisory Committee is tasked with providing objective review and comment to ensure NEMO remains a state-of-the-art ocean model. This group is consulted on a 3-5 year period to advise on strategy, and promote international collaborations.

The Steering Committee agrees on the tasks on the NEMO System Team's annual work-plan, seeks funding opportunities and is responsible for delivery of staff resources to the System Team.

In France, NEMO has been recognized since 2004 by the Institut national des sciences de l'Univers as a national community code ("outil national, code communautaire").

== Scientific applications ==
NEMO supports a wide range of scientific investigations across multiple spatial and temporal scales, from global to coastal environments, from paleoclimate to daily variability, and from coarse to high-resolution simulations. A survey distributed via the NEMO newsletter in 2024 revealed that NEMO is used by 149 teams from 89 institutions across 34 countries and is explicitly cited in more than 120 publications per year.

Its applications can be grouped into three main areas:

=== Fundamental oceanography ===
Research topics include ocean circulation (e.g., western boundary currents, equatorial dynamics, and coastal upwelling), thermohaline circulation and deep ocean processes, upper ocean variability and air–sea interactions, polar ocean processes including sea ice dynamics, and marine biogeochemical cycles such as carbon and nutrient cycling.

=== Climate studies ===
NEMO is used to investigate global and regional climate variability across timescales from daily to multi-centennial. It contributes to understanding ocean heat transport and storage, interactions with the atmosphere and cryosphere, and climate change processes. It is also used in intercomparison projects such as CMIP, OMIP, and SIMIP.

=== Operational oceanography ===
Applications include data assimilation, operational ocean prediction systems, and short- to medium-range weather forecasting. NEMO is used by Mercator Ocean for validation of their Digital Twin of the Ocean.

== Community Engagement ==
Communication with the user community is maintained through a website and newsletter, as well as a support forum based on Discourse. Annual interaction with users takes place during a dedicated session at the Drakkar Workshop, which includes presentations of new developments, discussion of future plans, and question-and-answer sessions.

Since 2025, the "NEMO Zoo" initiative has provided a collection of tutorials and demonstrators based on reference configurations and test cases. Designed for users at various levels (but with a special focus on beginners), these materials aim to lower the barrier for entry.

To facilitate code contributions from developers outside of the NEMO System Team, a fork (mirror) of the NEMO main is provided along with external developer's guidelines on coding rules and testing. If this development is then accepted into the NEMO main, the developer is invited as a co-author on the NEMO book for the subsequent release.

== Recent scientific and technical developments ==
Version 5.0 of NEMO, released in 2025, introduced several major developments. Computational performance was significantly improved through optimizations and the adoption of a third-order Runge–Kutta time-stepping scheme. By using this version it is possible to halve the timestep of a configuration and thus double the execution speed. These improvements were made with the aim of reducing computational costs and lowering the environmental impact of large-scale simulations.

NEMO version 5.0 also brings with it the first support for emerging computing architectures through integration of the PSyclone library, enabling code transformation and optimization for GPU-based systems. This development is in its nascent stage, but the aim is to be aligned with Exascale computing platforms.

Version 5 also includes updates to the representation of physical and biogeochemical processes. These include improved parameterizations of mesoscale ocean eddies, enhanced representation of small-scale turbulence, refinements in sea ice processes such as salt transport and interfacial friction, and a multi-spectral representation of light penetration in the ocean. With this version it is possible to run two sister grids in parallel using AGRIF grid refinement.

== Configurations ==
NEMO is distributed with a set of reference configurations that serve both as examples for users and as validation tools for developers. These configurations are used to test and verify code developments, often through the SETTE testing framework. Examples of reference configurations include AGRIF_DEMO, AMM12, C1D_PAPA, GYRE_PISCES, ORCA2_ICE_PISCES, ORCA2_OFF_PISCES, ORCA2_SAS_ICE, and WED025. In addition, simplified "test case" configurations are provided to evaluate specific model features. Tutorials and step-by-step guides for installing and running selected configurations are available through the NEMO Zoo.

NEMO's ocean model uses the Arakawa C-grid in the horizontal. Global configurations use ORCA tripolar grids, which allow the entire oceanic domain to be covered without singularity points. The grid formed by the meridians and the parallels has two singularities: the North Pole and the South Pole. Near these two points the mesh size tends to zero, making the use of modeling equations problematic. To overcome the problem, the poles of the ORCA grids are positioned on the terrestrial sphere in such a way as to be located on continents. Since the South Pole is located on the Antarctic continent, a modification of the standard grid is not required, while the North Pole, which is located in the Arctic Ocean, is replaced by two points located one in North America and the other in Siberia. The ORCA grid is available in different horizontal resolutions ranging from about 2 degrees to 1/12 degree.
