= Richard B. Rood =

American atmospheric scientist

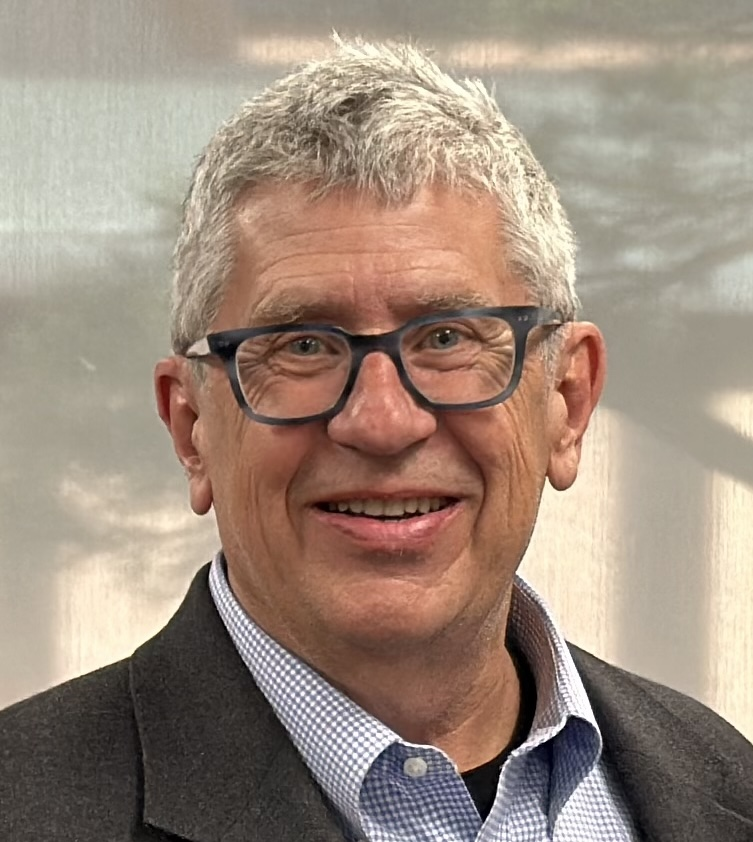
- Education: Florida State University, (MS), (Ph.D)
- Awards: NASA Exceptional Achievement Medal; NASA Outstanding Leadership Medal; Fellow of American Meteorological Society
- Scientific career
- Fields: Meteorology; Climatology; Science Management; Climate Adaptation
- Workplaces: University of Michigan; NASA

Richard B. (Ricky) Rood is an American atmospheric scientist and professor emeritus in the Department of Climate and Space Sciences and Engineering at the University of Michigan. Prior to his retirement he also held an appointment in the School for Environment and Sustainability and was a Dow Sustainability Distinguished Faculty Fellow. Rood is known for his work in climate modeling, science policy, education, and public communication of climate science.

== Education and career ==
Rood received his M.S. and Ph.D. in meteorology from Florida State University. Early in his career, he held prominent roles at NASA, where he contributed to the development of Earth system models and received the agency's Outstanding Leadership Medal and the Exceptional Achievement Medal.

At the University of Michigan, Rood served as the faculty advisor for the Master of Engineering in Applied Climate and also guided the undergraduate curriculum on climate impacts.

Rood has made contributions to several fields of research. The advection scheme he developed with Shian-Jiann Lin of the Geophysical Fluid Dynamics Laboratory is used in many atmospheric chemistry models and global climate models. As the founding Head of the Data Assimilation Office, Rood was responsible for the first reanalysis dataset, GEOS-1. The GEOS-1 data set in combination with the above-referenced numerical schemes became the foundation for GEOS-CHEM.

In 1999, Rood was detailed to the Office of Science and Technology Policy. He was the lead author of an influential report on development of a federal strategy for the provision of climate-modeling products and high-performance computing capabilities. He has contributed to two National Research Council reports on climate modeling and computing.

Rood was the climate change blogger for the Weather Underground (weather service) through early 2017, and his writings are widely reproduced on the web and cited in blogs and media outlets. In 2016 with Andrew Gettelmen, Rood published an open-access users guide entitled Demystifying Climate Models.

=== NOAA and UMAC ===
Rood has played a role in efforts to reform and improve U.S. operational climate and weather modeling. He served as co-chair of the Unified Model Advisory Committee (UMAC), an external advisory group established by the National Oceanic and Atmospheric Administration (NOAA) to provide recommendations on the development and implementation of the Unified Forecast System (UFS). UMAC’s 2015 report was instrumental in shaping NOAA's strategy for numerical environmental prediction.

=== Climate Education and Curriculum Development ===
Rood also worked in climate change education and curriculum design.

His educational materials have been adapted for use beyond the university, including in high school classrooms (in collaboration with educator Tim Muhich) and in medical school settings. His approach focused systems thinking and applied problem-solving in climate science.

=== Science Communication ===
Rood has been active in public science communication for more than a decade. He writes the long-running “Climate Blue” column, which explores climate issues from scientific, policy, and societal perspectives. He is also a frequent contributor to The Conversation. Through these platforms, Rood addresses topics such as climate adaptation, emissions policy, and the evolving relationship between science and public trust.

=== Climate Change Adaptation and Great Lakes Research ===
In the past decade, Rood has expanded his work to focus on climate change adaptation, with a portion centered on the Great Lakes region. Through his role with the Great Lakes Integrated Sciences and Assessments (GLISA) program; a NOAA-supported initiative, Rood has contributed to applied climate science aimed at helping communities and governments better prepare for and respond to the local impacts of climate change.

His research and outreach highlight the importance of improving the “fit-for-purpose” design of global climate models, which were originally built for long-term projections but are now being repurposed to guide near-term adaptation efforts; Rood has emphasized that current simulations especially those from the Coupled Model Intercomparison Project (CMIP) often fall short in supporting localized decisions, such as those required for designing long-lived infrastructure or managing water systems.

By using the Great Lakes region as a case study, Rood has pointed to specific challenges in applying existing model outputs to regional adaptation planning.

== Awards ==
Rood is a Fellow of the American Meteorological Society, and he holds the World Meteorological Organization's Norbert Gerbier Award. He has been recognized with the NASA Exceptional Achievement Medal and NASA Outstanding Leadership Medal.

== Selected publications ==
- Rood, Richard B. (1987). "Numerical advection algorithms and their role in atmospheric transport and chemistry models". Reviews of Geophysics. 25 (1): 71–100. doi:10.1029/RG025i001p00071. ISSN 8755-1209.
- Jackman, Charles H.; Douglass, Anne R.; Rood, Richard B.; McPeters, Richard D.; Meade, Paul E. (1990-05-20). "Effect of solar proton events on the middle atmosphere during the past two solar cycles as computed using a two-dimensional model". Journal of Geophysical Research: Atmospheres. 95 (D6): 7417–7428. Bibcode:1990JGR....95.7417J. doi:10.1029/JD095iD06p07417. ISSN 0148-0227.
- Schubert, Siegfried D.; Rood, Richard B.; Pfaendtner, James (1993). "An Assimilated Dataset for Earth Science Applications". Bulletin of the American Meteorological Society. 74 (12): 2331–2342. Bibcode:1993BAMS...74.2331S. doi:10.1175/1520-0477(1993)074<2331:AADFES>2.0.CO;2. ISSN 0003-0007.
- Holton, James R.; Haynes, Peter H.; McIntyre, Michael E.; Douglass, Anne R.; Rood, Richard B.; Pfister, Leonhard (1995). "Stratosphere-troposphere exchange". Reviews of Geophysics. 33 (4): 403–439. Bibcode:1995RvGeo..33..403H. doi:10.1029/95RG02097. ISSN 8755-1209.
- Lin, Shian-Jiann; Rood, Richard B. (1996). "Multidimensional Flux-Form Semi-Lagrangian Transport Schemes". Monthly Weather Review. 124 (9): 2046–2070. Bibcode:1996MWRv..124.2046L. doi:10.1175/1520-0493(1996)124<2046:MFFSLT>2.0.CO;2. ISSN 0027-0644.
- Lin, Shian-Jiann; Rood, Richard B. (1997). "An explicit flux-form semi-lagrangian shallow-water model on the sphere". Quarterly Journal of the Royal Meteorological Society. 123 (544): 2477–2498. Bibcode:1997QJRMS.123.2477L. doi:10.1002/qj.49712354416. ISSN 0035-9009.
- Chin, Mian; Rood, Richard B.; Lin, Shian-Jiann; Müller, Jean-Francois; Thompson, Anne M. (2000-10-27). "Atmospheric sulfur cycle simulated in the global model GOCART: Model description and global properties". Journal of Geophysical Research: Atmospheres. 105 (D20): 24671–24687. Bibcode:2000JGR...10524671C. doi:10.1029/2000JD900384. hdl:11603/34946. ISSN 0148-0227.
- Ramaswamy, V.; Chanin, M.-L.; Angell, J.; Barnett, J.; Gaffen, D.; Gelman, M.; Keckhut, P.; Koshelkov, Y.; Labitzke, K.; Lin, J.-J. R.; O'Neill, A.; Nash, J.; Randel, W.; Rood, R.; Shine, K. (2001). "Stratospheric temperature trends: Observations and model simulations". Reviews of Geophysics. 39 (1): 71–122. Bibcode:2001RvGeo..39...71R. doi:10.1029/1999RG000065. ISSN 8755-1209.
- Lemos, Maria Carmen; Rood, Richard B. (2010). "Climate projections and their impact on policy and practice". WIREs Climate Change. 1 (5): 670–682. Bibcode:2010WIRCC...1..670L. doi:10.1002/wcc.71. ISSN 1757-7780.
- Clune, T. L.; Rood, R. B. (2011). "Software Testing and Verification in Climate Model Development". IEEE Software. 28 (6): 49–55. Bibcode:2011ISoft..28f..49C. doi:10.1109/MS.2011.117. hdl:2060/20110015506. ISSN 0740-7459.
- McKENNEY, Daniel W.; Pedlar, John H.; Rood, Richard B.; Price, David (2011). "Revisiting projected shifts in the climate envelopes of North American trees using updated general circulation models: INTERGENERATIONAL DIFFERENCES IN GCM PROJECTIONS". Global Change Biology. 17 (8): 2720–2730. doi:10.1111/j.1365-2486.2011.02413.x. hdl:2027.42/86847.
- Lemos, Maria Carmen; Kirchhoff, Christine J.; Kalafatis, Scott E.; Scavia, Donald; Rood, Richard B. (2014-04-01). "Moving Climate Information off the Shelf: Boundary Chains and the Role of RISAs as Adaptive Organizations". Weather, Climate, and Society. 6 (2): 273–285. doi:10.1175/WCAS-D-13-00044.1. ISSN 1948-8327.
- Gettelman, Andrew; Rood, Richard B. (2016). Demystifying Climate Models: A Users Guide to Earth System Models. Earth Systems Data and Models. Vol. 2. Berlin, Heidelberg: Springer Berlin Heidelberg. doi:10.1007/978-3-662-48959-8. ISBN 978-3-662-48957-4.
- Gronewold, Andrew D.; Rood, Richard B. (2019-02-01). "Recent water level changes across Earth's largest lake system and implications for future variability". Journal of Great Lakes Research. 45 (1): 1–3. Bibcode:2019JGLR...45....1G. doi:10.1016/j.jglr.2018.10.012. ISSN 0380-1330.
- Laura, Briley; Kelly, Rachel; Blackmer, Emily D; Troncoso, Andrea Vega; Rood, Richard B.; Andresen, Jeffrey; Lemos, Maria Carmen (22 Oct 2020). "Increasing the Usability of Climate Models through the Use of Consumer-Report-Style Resources for Decision-Making". American Meteorological Society. 101 (10): E1709–E1717. Bibcode:2020BAMS..101E1709B. doi:10.1175/BAMS-D-19-0099.1.
- Briley, Laura J.; Rood, Richard B.; Notaro, Michael (2021). "Large lakes in climate models: A Great Lakes case study on the usability of CMIP5". Journal of Great Lakes Research. 47 (2): 405–418. Bibcode:2021JGLR...47..405B. doi:10.1016/j.jglr.2021.01.010. ISSN 0380-1330.
