= MIT General Circulation Model =

Numerical model of Earth's oceans

The MIT General Circulation Model (MITgcm) is computer software that solves the equations of motion governing the ocean or Earth's atmosphere using the finite volume method. Its equations are discretized on the Arakawa C-grid. It was developed at the Massachusetts Institute of Technology and was one of the first non-hydrostatic models of the ocean. It has an automatically generated adjoint that allows the model to be used for data assimilation. The MITgcm is written in the programming language Fortran.

== See also ==
- Physical oceanography
- Global climate model
