= Princeton Ocean Model =

Ocean currents simulation system

The Princeton Ocean Model (POM) is a community general numerical model for ocean circulation that can be used to simulate and predict oceanic currents, temperatures, salinities and other water properties. POM-WEB and POMusers.org

== Development ==
The model code was originally developed at Princeton University (G. Mellor and Alan Blumberg) in collaboration with Dynalysis of Princeton (H. James Herring, Richard C. Patchen). The model incorporates the Mellor–Yamada turbulence scheme developed in the early 1970s by George Mellor and Ted Yamada; this turbulence sub-model is widely used by oceanic and atmospheric models. At the time, early computer ocean models such as the Bryan–Cox model (developed in the late 1960s at the Geophysical Fluid Dynamics Laboratory, GFDL, and later became the Modular Ocean Model, MOM)), were aimed mostly at coarse-resolution simulations of the large-scale ocean circulation, so there was a need for a numerical model that can handle high-resolution coastal ocean processes. The Blumberg–Mellor model (which later became POM) thus included new features such as free surface to handle tides, sigma vertical coordinates (i.e., terrain-following) to handle complex topographies and shallow regions, a curvilinear grid to better handle coastlines, and a turbulence scheme to handle vertical mixing. At the early 1980s the model was used primarily to simulate estuaries such as the Hudson–Raritan Estuary (by Leo Oey) and the Delaware Bay (Boris Galperin), but also first attempts to use a sigma coordinate model for basin-scale problems have started with the coarse resolution model of the Gulf of Mexico (Blumberg and Mellor) and models of the Arctic Ocean (with the inclusion of ice-ocean coupling by Lakshmi Kantha and Sirpa Hakkinen). POM uses the Arakawa C-grid in the horizontal.

In the early 1990s when the web and browsers started to be developed, POM became one of the first ocean model codes that were provided free of charge to users through the web. The establishment of the POM users group and its web support (by Tal Ezer) resulted in a continuous increase in the number of POM users which grew from about a dozen U.S. users in the 1980s to over 1000 users in 2000 and over 4000 users by 2009; there are users from over 70 different countries. In the 1990s the usage of POM expands to simulations of the Mediterranean Sea (Zavatarelli) and the first simulations with a sigma coordinate model of the entire Atlantic Ocean for climate research (Ezer). The development of the Mellor–Ezer optimal interpolation data assimilation scheme that projects surface satellite data into deep layers allows the construction of the first ocean forecast systems for the Gulf Stream and the U.S. east coast running operationally at the NOAA's National Weather Service (Frank Aikman and others). Operational forecast system for other regions such as the Great Lakes, the Gulf of Mexico (Oey), the Gulf of Maine (Huijie Xue) and the Hudson River (Blumberg) followed. For more information on applications of the model, see the searchable database of over 1800 POM-related publications.

== Derivatives and other models ==
In the late 1990s and the 2000s many other terrain-following community ocean models have been developed; some of their features can be traced back to features included in the original POM, other features are additional numerical and parameterization improvements. Several ocean models are direct descendants of POM such as the commercial version of POM known as the estuarine and coastal ocean model (ECOM), the navy coastal ocean model (NCOM) and the finite-volume coastal ocean model (FVCOM). Recent developments in POM include a generalized coordinate system that combines sigma and z-level grids (Mellor and Ezer), inundation features that allow simulations of wetting and drying (e.g., flood of land area) (Oey), and coupling ocean currents with surface waves (Mellor). Efforts to improve turbulent mixing also continue (Galperin, Kantha, Mellor and others).

== Users' meetings ==
POM users' meetings were held every few years, and in recent years the meetings were extended to include other models and renamed the International Workshop on Modeling the Ocean (IWMO). Meeting Pages: List of meetings:

1. 1996, June 10–12, Princeton, NJ, USA (POM96)
2. 1998, February 17–19, Miami, FL, USA (POM98)
3. 1999, September 20–22, Bar Harbor, ME, USA (SigMod99)
4. 2001, August 20–22, Boulder, CO, USA (SigMod01)
5. 2003, August 4–6, Seattle, WA, USA (SigMod03)
6. 2009, February 23–26, Taipei, Taiwan (1st IWMO-2009)
7. 2010, May 24–26, Norfolk, VA, USA (2nd IWMO-2010; IWMO-2010)
8. 2011, June 6–9, Qingdao, China (3rd IWMO-2011; IWMO-2011)
9. 2012, May 21–24, Yokohama, Japan (4th IWMO-2012; )
10. 2013, June 17–20, Bergen, Norway (5th IWMO-2013; )
11. 2014, June 23–27, Halifax, Nova Scotia, Canada (6th IWMO-2014; )
12. 2015, June 1–5, Canberra, Australia (7th IWMO-2015; ).
13. 2016, June 7–10, Bologna, Italy (8th IWMO-2016;).
14. 2017, July 3–6, Seoul, South Korea (9th IWMO-2017;).
15. 2018, June 25–28, Santos, Brazil (10th IWMO-2018;).
16. 2019, June 17–20, Wuxi, China (11th IWMO-2019;).
17. 2022. June 28-July 1, Ann Arbor, MI, USA (12th IWMO-2022).
18. 2023, June 27–30, Hamburg, Germany (13th IWMO-2023).

Reviewed papers from the IWMO meetings are published by Ocean Dynamics in special issues (IWMO-2009 Part-I, IWMO-2009 Part-II, IWMO-2010, IWMO-2011, IWMO-2012, IWMO-2013, IWMO-2014).
