= Fleet Numerical Meteorology and Oceanography Center =

Echelon IV command of the U.S. Navy

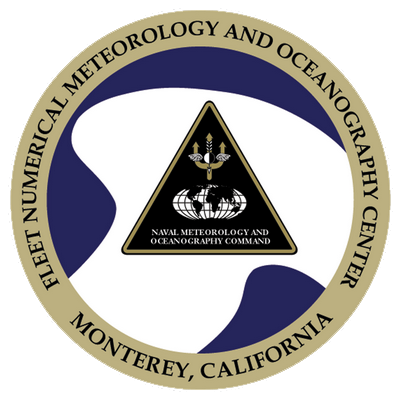
- Fleet Numerical Meteorology and Oceanography Center Logo
- Active: 1958–Present
- Country: United States
- Branch: United States Navy
- Type: Echelon IV command
- Part of: Naval Meteorology and Oceanography Command
- Garrison/HQ: Monterey, California
- Website: www.metoc.navy.mil/fnmoc/fnmoc.html

Commanders
- Commanding officer: CAPT Mathias Roth
- Executive Officer: CDR Christopher Tuggle
- Technical Director: John Ertl

The Fleet Numerical Meteorology and Oceanography Center (FNMOC) is an echelon IV component of the Naval Meteorology and Oceanography Command (NMOC), which provides worldwide meteorological and oceanographic data and analysis for the United States Navy and strategic allies of the United States. The center is based out of Monterey, California. FNMOC provides Global and Regional Weather Prediction Charts (WXMAP) and Global Ensemble Weather Prediction Charts (EFS). WxMAP depictions of NAVGEM predictions for side-by-side comparison with NCEP global NWS models (GFS) are also available. FNMOC provides Global and Regional Ocean Wave Prediction Charts (WW3), Global Ensemble Ocean Wave Prediction Charts (WW3 Ensemble), and Global Sea Surface Temperature and Sea Surface Anomaly Charts (NCODA). FNMOC provides links to satellite imagery of tropical cyclones (TCWEB) and current tropical storm forecast tracks.

FNMOC is composed of military and civilian personnel. The team consists of specialists in meteorology, oceanography, computer science, and Fleet operations. The team's efforts provide computerized weather and ocean prediction products, weather satellite imagery products, and related tactical decision aids and data, supporting virtually every combat platform and weapons system operated by the US Navy.

== History ==
In 1958, the Navy Numerical Weather Problems (NANWEP) group was established in Suitland, Maryland. NANWEP was later moved to the Naval Postgraduate School (NPS) in 1959. Fleet Numerical Weather Facility was established in 1961. In 1974, Fleet Numerical Weather Facility moved from NPS to its standalone location in Monterey, California. In 1993, the operating title: Fleet Numerical Meteorology and Oceanography Center (FNMOC), was adopted. In 2005, Fleet Numerical was realigned under Naval Meteorology and Oceanography Command (NMOC). In 2011, Fleet Numerical completed a new Computer Operations Center.

FNMOC is one of the US Department of Defense's (DOD) primary central production sites for worldwide computer-generated operational meteorological and oceanographic analysis and forecast products.

== Organization ==
FNMOC is an echelon IV command aligned under the Naval Meteorology and Oceanography Command (COMNAVMETOCCOM) or CNMOC. FNMOC is co-located with Naval Research Laboratory (NRL) Marine Meteorology Division. FNMOC maintains close ties with the nearby Naval Postgraduate School.

== Numerical Weather Prediction ==
Central to FNMOC modeling capability is a global numerical weather model called the Navy Global Environmental Model (NAVGEM) and a global ocean prediction model called the Hybrid Coordinate Ocean Model (HYCOM). FNMOC models a variety of global, regional, sub-regional areas and specialized ocean and atmospheric environments as the DOD's premier Numerical Weather Prediction Center.
