= Isopycnic =

Fluid surface of constant density

Viruses purified by isopycnic centrifugation— a density gradient was formed during high speed centrifugation of a solution of caesium chloride and the two virus types come to rest at points corresponding to their density. The tube is about 10cm long.

An isopycnic surface is a surface of constant density inside a fluid. Isopycnic surfaces contrast with isobaric or isothermal surfaces, which describe surfaces of constant pressure and constant temperature respectively. Isopycnic surfaces are sometimes referred to as "iso-density" surfaces, although this is strictly incorrect. Isopycnic typically describes surfaces, not processes. Unless there is a flux of mass into or out of a control volume, a process which occurs at a constant density also occurs at a constant volume and is called an isochoric process and not an isopycnic process.

The term "isopycnic" is commonly encountered in the fluid dynamics of compressible fluids, such as in meteorology and geophysical fluid dynamics, astrophysics, or the fluid dynamics of explosions or high Mach number flows.It may also be applied to other situations where a continuous medium has smoothly varying density, such as in the case of an inhomogeneous colloidal suspension. In general isopycnic surfaces will occur in fluids in hydrostatic equilibrium coinciding with equipotential surfaces formed by gravity.

The term "isopycnic" is also encountered in biophysical chemistry, usually in reference to a process of separating particles, subcellular organelles, or other substances on the basis of their density. Isopycnic centrifugation refers to a method wherein a density gradient is either pre-formed or forms during high speed centrifugation. After this gradient is formed particles move within the gradient to the position having a density matching their own (this is in fact an incorrect description of the exact physical process but does describe the result in a meaningful way). This technique is extremely powerful.

In geology, isopycnic surfaces occur especially in connection with cratons which are very old geologic formations at the core of the continents, little affected by tectonic events. These formations are often known as shields or platforms. These formations are, relative to other lithospheric formations, cooler and less dense but much more isopycnic.

== See also ==
- isopycnic centrifugation
- Isosteric
