= Finite Volume Community Ocean Model =

Ocean circulation model

FVCOM simulation of hypersaline sea surface release and propagation under tidal conditions in the northern North Sea

The Finite Volume Community Ocean Model (FVCOM; Formerly Finite Volume Coastal Ocean Model) is a prognostic, unstructured-grid, free-surface, 3-D primitive equation coastal ocean circulation model. The model is developed primarily by researchers at the University of Massachusetts Dartmouth and Woods Hole Oceanographic Institution, and used by researchers worldwide. Originally developed for the estuarine flooding/drying process, FVCOM has been upgraded to the spherical coordinate system for basin and global applications.
