= Thomas L. Delworth =

American oceanic climate scientist

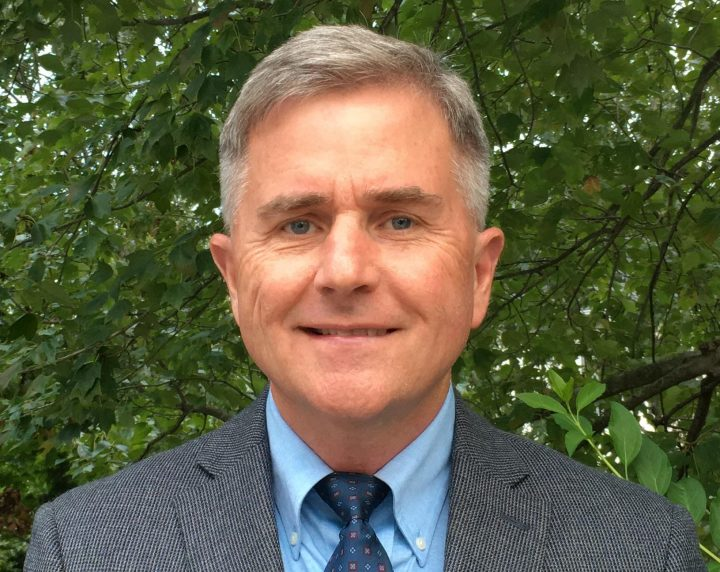
- Born: St. Louis Missouri
- Education: Northwestern University, University of Wisconsin
- Scientific career
- Institutions: GFDL, NOAA, Princeton University

External videos
- "Tom Delworth earns AGU Bert Bolin Award for Climate research at GFDL,·NOAA,·Sep 10, 2021

Thomas L. Delworth is an atmospheric and oceanic climate scientist and Senior Scientist at the Geophysical Fluid Dynamics Laboratory (GFDL), part of NOAA. He also serves on the faculty of Oceanic Science at Princeton University.

Delworth is a fellow of the American Geophysical Union and received its 2021 Bert Bolin Award for Climate research, for "major contributions in atmosphere ocean interactions through pioneering climate modeling that has advanced the understanding of climate variations, change, and extremes." He has been recognized as a Highly Cited Researcher by Clarivate Analytics for 2021 and multiple previous years for having "demonstrated significant influence through publication of multiple highly cited papers during the last decade".

== Early life and education ==
Delworth grew up in St. Louis, Missouri. He received his B.S. in Integrated Science in 1979 from Northwestern University. He earned his MS in meteorology (1983) and his Ph.D. in Atmospheric Science (1994) from the University of Wisconsin.

== Career ==
In 1984, Delworth joined the Climate Dynamics Group of the Geophysical Fluid Dynamics Laboratory (GFDL), part of the Office of Oceanic & Atmospheric Research of the National Oceanic & Atmospheric Administration (NOAA) of the U.S. Department of Commerce, in Princeton, NJ. He has served as a Research Meteorologist (1984–2001), a Group Leader (2001–2012) and Supervisory Physical Scientist (2012-). In addition Delworth has been a lecturer in atmospheric and oceanic sciences at Princeton University since 2008.

Delworth has collaborated with many others including 2021 Nobel Laureate Syukuro Manabe, who created the first climate models to show the effects of carbon dioxide building up in the atmosphere, Ronald J. Stouffer, Michael E. Mann, and Rong Zhang. Delworth serves on the Syukuro Manabe Climate Research Award Committee of the American Meteorological Society.

== Research ==
Delworth studies the global climate system through long-term global climate modeling at timescales ranging from seasons to decades and centuries with an emphasis on understanding climate variability, change and predictability. He has helped to develop climate modelling systems including CM2.1 and SPEAR. He has used hierarchies of models to examine climate variability and related changes. He compares the natural variability of the climate (changes that would occur without human influence) with responses to atmospheric changes in greenhouse gases and aerosols that result from human actions.

Delworth's research focuses on the impact of oceans throughout the global climate system, affecting both oceans and continents worldwide. Delworth has done key research into the operation of the Atlantic Meridional Overturning Circulation (AMOC) and the related Atlantic Multidecadal Variability (AMV) and North Atlantic Oscillation (NAO). He is credited with "major contributions in atmosphere ocean interactions through pioneering climate modeling that has advanced the understanding of climate variations, change, and extremes." He has collaborated widely on studies of the role of the ocean in extreme weather such as warming temperatures, drought, tropical cyclones, flooding and winter storms.

"The ocean is big. It covers 70 percent of the Earth. It stores a lot of heat and it moves heat around. If the Atlantic Ocean is warm, how does that impact climate? If the Arctic sea ice is melting, what does that do?" - Thomas L. Delworth, 2021

== Awards and honors ==
- 2021, Bert Bolin Award for Climate Research, American Geophysical Union
- 2021, Highly Cited Researcher, Clarivate Analytics (as well as multiple previous years)
- 2018, Fellow, American Geophysical Union
- 2015, Fellow, American Meteorological Society
- 2015, Department of Commerce Gold Medal, joint award, "For outstanding research, leading to improved capability to predict seasonal‐to‐decadal variations in regional hydrological conditions and extremes".
- 2008, NOAA Administrator's Award, joint award, "for outstanding dedication to developing U.S. CCSP Synthesis and Assessment Products integrating climate research for decision support."
- 2005, Department of Commerce Silver Medal, joint award, "For delivering state-of-the-art model simulations of past, present, and future climate and for enabling open access to the data sets. Results from a recent international workshop support the conclusion that the Geophysical Fluid Dynamics Laboratory climate model is among the best in the world".

== Selected publications ==
- Yang, Xiaosong; Delworth, Thomas L.; Zeng, Fanrong; Zhang, Liping; Cooke, William F.; Harrison, Matthew J.; Rosati, Anthony; Underwood, Seth; Compo, Gilbert P.; McColl, Chesley (November 2021). "On the Development of GFDL's Decadal Prediction System: Initialization Approaches and Retrospective Forecast Assessment". Journal of Advances in Modeling Earth Systems. 13 (11). Bibcode:2021JAMES..1302529Y. doi:10.1029/2021MS002529. ISSN 1942-2466. S2CID 244604299.
- Delworth, Thomas L.; Cooke, William F.; Adcroft, Alistair; Bushuk, Mitchell; Chen, Jan-Huey; Dunne, Krista A.; Ginoux, Paul; Gudgel, Richard; Hallberg, Robert W.; Harris, Lucas; Harrison, Matthew J.; Johnson, Nathaniel; Kapnick, Sarah B.; Lin, Shian-Jian; Lu, Feiyu; Malyshev, Sergey; Milly, Paul C.; Murakami, Hiroyuki; Naik, Vaishali; Pascale, Salvatore; Paynter, David; Rosati, Anthony; Schwarzkopf, M.D.; Shevliakova, Elena; Underwood, Seth; Wittenberg, Andrew T.; Xiang, Baoqiang; Yang, Xiaosong; Zeng, Fanrong; Zhang, Honghai; Zhang, Liping; Zhao, Ming (March 2020). "SPEAR: The Next Generation GFDL Modeling System for Seasonal to Multidecadal Prediction and Projection". Journal of Advances in Modeling Earth Systems. 12 (3). Bibcode:2020JAMES..1201895D. doi:10.1029/2019MS001895. hdl:11585/850745. ISSN 1942-2466. S2CID 213041806.
- Zhang, Honghai; Delworth, Thomas L. (20 March 2018). "Robustness of anthropogenically forced decadal precipitation changes projected for the 21st century". Nature Communications. 9 (1): 1150. Bibcode:2018NatCo...9.1150Z. doi:10.1038/s41467-018-03611-3. ISSN 2041-1723. PMC 5861119. PMID 29559635. S2CID 3978277.
- Delworth, Thomas L.; Zeng, Fanrong; Zhang, Liping; Zhang, Rong; Vecchi, Gabriel A.; Yang, Xiaosong (15 May 2017). "The Central Role of Ocean Dynamics in Connecting the North Atlantic Oscillation to the Extratropical Component of the Atlantic Multidecadal Oscillation". Journal of Climate. 30 (10): 3789–3805. Bibcode:2017JCli...30.3789D. doi:10.1175/JCLI-D-16-0358.1. ISSN 0894-8755.
- Zhang, Liping; Delworth, Thomas L. (15 August 2016). "Simulated Response of the Pacific Decadal Oscillation to Climate Change". Journal of Climate. 29 (16): 5999–6018. Bibcode:2016JCli...29.5999Z. doi:10.1175/JCLI-D-15-0690.1. ISSN 0894-8755.
- Delworth, Thomas L.; Zeng, Fanrong; Vecchi, Gabriel A.; Yang, Xiaosong; Zhang, Liping; Zhang, Rong (July 2016). "The North Atlantic Oscillation as a driver of rapid climate change in the Northern Hemisphere". Nature Geoscience. 9 (7): 509–512. Bibcode:2016NatGe...9..509D. doi:10.1038/ngeo2738. ISSN 1752-0908.
- Delworth, Thomas L.; Zeng, Fanrong (1 February 2016). "The Impact of the North Atlantic Oscillation on Climate through Its Influence on the Atlantic Meridional Overturning Circulation". Journal of Climate. 29 (3): 941–962. Bibcode:2016JCli...29..941D. doi:10.1175/JCLI-D-15-0396.1. ISSN 0894-8755.
- Donner, Leo J.; Wyman, Bruce L.; Hemler, Richard S.; Horowitz, Larry W.; Ming, Yi; Zhao, Ming; Golaz, Jean-Christophe; Ginoux, Paul; Lin, S.-J.; Schwarzkopf, M. Daniel; Austin, John; Alaka, Ghassan; Cooke, William F.; Delworth, Thomas L.; Freidenreich, Stuart M.; Gordon, C. T.; Griffies, Stephen M.; Held, Isaac M.; Hurlin, William J.; Klein, Stephen A.; Knutson, Thomas R.; Langenhorst, Amy R.; Lee, Hyun-Chul; Lin, Yanluan; Magi, Brian I.; Malyshev, Sergey L.; Milly, P. C. D.; Naik, Vaishali; Nath, Mary J.; Pincus, Robert; Ploshay, Jeffrey J.; Ramaswamy, V.; Seman, Charles J.; Shevliakova, Elena; Sirutis, Joseph J.; Stern, William F.; Stouffer, Ronald J.; Wilson, R. John; Winton, Michael; Wittenberg, Andrew T.; Zeng, Fanrong (1 July 2011). "The Dynamical Core, Physical Parameterizations, and Basic Simulation Characteristics of the Atmospheric Component AM3 of the GFDL Global Coupled Model CM3". Journal of Climate. 24 (13): 3484–3519. Bibcode:2011JCli...24.3484D. doi:10.1175/2011JCLI3955.1. ISSN 0894-8755. S2CID 18101763.
- Meehl, Gerald A.; Covey, Curt; Delworth, Thomas; Latif, Mojib; McAvaney, Bryant; Mitchell, John F. B.; Stouffer, Ronald J.; Taylor, Karl E. (1 September 2007). "THE WCRP CMIP3 Multimodel Dataset: A New Era in Climate Change Research" (PDF). Bulletin of the American Meteorological Society. 88 (9): 1383–1394. Bibcode:2007BAMS...88.1383M. doi:10.1175/BAMS-88-9-1383.
- Delworth, Thomas L.; Broccoli, Anthony J.; Rosati, Anthony; Stouffer, Ronald J.; Balaji, V.; Beesley, John A.; Cooke, William F.; Dixon, Keith W.; Dunne, John; Dunne, K. A.; Durachta, Jeffrey W.; Findell, Kirsten L.; Ginoux, Paul; Gnanadesikan, Anand; Gordon, C. T.; Griffies, Stephen M.; Gudgel, Rich; Harrison, Matthew J.; Held, Isaac M.; Hemler, Richard S.; Horowitz, Larry W.; Klein, Stephen A.; Knutson, Thomas R.; Kushner, Paul J.; Langenhorst, Amy R.; Lee, Hyun-Chul; Lin, Shian-Jiann; Lu, Jian; Malyshev, Sergey L.; Milly, P. C. D.; Ramaswamy, V.; Russell, Joellen; Schwarzkopf, M. Daniel; Shevliakova, Elena; Sirutis, Joseph J.; Spelman, Michael J.; Stern, William F.; Winton, Michael; Wittenberg, Andrew T.; Wyman, Bruce; Zeng, Fanrong; Zhang, Rong (1 March 2006). "GFDL's CM2 Global Coupled Climate Models. Part I: Formulation and Simulation Characteristics". Journal of Climate. 19 (5): 643–674. Bibcode:2006JCli...19..643D. doi:10.1175/JCLI3629.1. ISSN 0894-8755.
- Zhang, Rong; Delworth, Thomas L. (2006). "Impact of Atlantic multidecadal oscillations on India/Sahel rainfall and Atlantic hurricanes". Geophysical Research Letters. 33 (17): L17712. Bibcode:2006GeoRL..3317712Z. doi:10.1029/2006GL026267. ISSN 0094-8276. S2CID 16588748.
- Zhang, Rong; Delworth, Thomas L. (15 June 2005). "Simulated Tropical Response to a Substantial Weakening of the Atlantic Thermohaline Circulation". Journal of Climate. 18 (12): 1853–1860. Bibcode:2005JCli...18.1853Z. doi:10.1175/JCLI3460.1. ISSN 0894-8755.
- Delworth, T.; Stouffer, R.; Dixon, K.; Spelman, M.; Knutson, T.; Broccoli, A.; Kushner, P.; Wetherald, R. (1 September 2002). "Review of simulations of climate variability and change with the GFDL R30 coupled climate model" (PDF). Climate Dynamics. 19 (7): 555–574. Bibcode:2002ClDy...19..555D. doi:10.1007/s00382-002-0249-5. S2CID 11482584.
- Milly, P. C. D.; Wetherald, R. T.; Dunne, K. A.; Delworth, T. L. (January 2002). "Increasing risk of great floods in a changing climate". Nature. 415 (6871): 514–517. doi:10.1038/415514a. ISSN 1476-4687. PMID 11823857. S2CID 4365687.
- Levitus, Sydney; Antonov, John I.; Wang, Julian; Delworth, Thomas L.; Dixon, Keith W.; Broccoli, Anthony J. (13 April 2001). "Anthropogenic Warming of Earth's Climate System" (PDF). Science. 292 (5515): 267–270. Bibcode:2001Sci...292..267L. doi:10.1126/science.1058154. PMID 11303098. S2CID 880090.
- Allen, Myles R.; Stott, Peter A.; Mitchell, John F. B.; Schnur, Reiner; Delworth, Thomas L. (October 2000). "Quantifying the uncertainty in forecasts of anthropogenic climate change". Nature. 407 (6804): 617–620. Bibcode:2000Natur.407..617A. doi:10.1038/35036559. ISSN 1476-4687. PMID 11034207. S2CID 4426713.
- Delworth, T. L.; Mann, M. E. (1 September 2000). "Observed and simulated multidecadal variability in the Northern Hemisphere". Climate Dynamics. 16 (9): 661–676. Bibcode:2000ClDy...16..661D. doi:10.1007/s003820000075. ISSN 1432-0894. S2CID 7412990.
- Delworth, Thomas L.; Manabe, Syukuro; Stouffer, Ronald J. (1 February 1997). "Multidecadal climate variability in the Greenland Sea and surrounding regions: A coupled model simulation" (PDF). Geophysical Research Letters. 24 (3): 257–260. Bibcode:1997GeoRL..24..257D. doi:10.1029/96gl03927. S2CID 8459065.
- Delworth, T.; Manabe, S.; Stouffer, R. J. (1 November 1993). "Interdecadal Variations of the Thermohaline Circulation in a Coupled Ocean-Atmosphere Model". Journal of Climate. 6 (11): 1993–2011. Bibcode:1993JCli....6.1993D. doi:10.1175/1520-0442(1993)006<1993:IVOTTC>2.0.CO;2. ISSN 0894-8755.
