= CDX =

CDX or CDx may stand for:

- Cdx, a gene family
- CDX Format in chemistry software
- Climate Data Exchange, software
- Community Development Exchange
- Companion diagnostic (Cdx)
- Council of Ten (Consiglio Dei Dieci) of the Venetian Republic
- Cyclodextrins or cycloamyloses, a family of oligosaccharides
- Sega CD-X, a video game console
- The Datel CDX cartridge
- The Numark CDX, a CD turntable
- The CDX Credit default swap index
- 410 in Roman numerals
- An average graded sheet of exterior plywood
- Centre-right coalition, an alliance of political parties in Italy
