= Ronald J. Stouffer =

American climate scientist

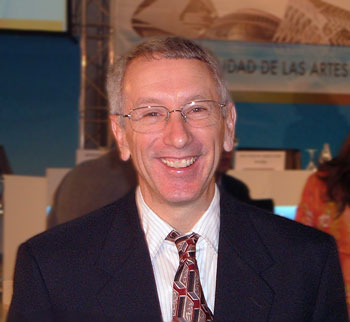
- Education: Pennsylvania State University
- Scientific career
- Workplaces: Geophysical Fluid Dynamics Laboratory, NOAA, Princeton University, University of Arizona

Ronald J. Stouffer is a meteorologist and adjunct professor at the University of Arizona, formerly Senior Research Climatologist and head of the Climate and Ecosystems Group at the Geophysical Fluid Dynamics Laboratory (GFDL), part of NOAA. He has also served on the faculty of Princeton University.

Stouffer is a Fellow of the American Meteorological Society and the American Geophysical Union, to which he was elected “for his path-breaking development of coupled atmosphere-ocean climate models and their use in research on the oceans’ role in climate change”. With 2021 Nobel laureate Syukuro Manabe, Stouffer developed the first models to couple the atmosphere and ocean to create global climate warming projections. He is recognized for the accuracy of his models. He has published at least 220 papers on climate change, and has been recognized as a Highly Cited Researcher by Clarivate Analytics for multiple years. He serves on the editorial board of Climate Dynamics.

Stouffer has been both a member and chair of the Working Group on Climate Modeling of the World Climate Research Program (1993-), developing the Coupled Model Intercomparison Project (CMIP). Stouffer has been a contributing author to multiple Intergovernmental Panel on Climate Change (IPCC) reports (1995, 2001, 2007), for which the IPCC won the 2007 Nobel Peace Prize.

== Early life and education ==
Stouffer earned his BS (1976) and MS (1977) in Meteorology from Pennsylvania State University.

== Career ==
Stouffer joined the Geophysical Fluid Dynamics Laboratory (GFDL) in 1977, remaining there until 2016. From 2009 to 2012 he served as Group Head of the Climate and Ecosystems Group. From 2012 to 2016 Stouffer served as Senior Scientist of Earth System Modeling and Science.

As of 2016, Stouffer became an adjunct professor at the University of Arizona.

== Research ==
Stouffer collaborated with Syukuro Manabe, who created the first climate models to show the effects of carbon dioxide building up in the atmosphere. In the 1980s, Manabe and Stouffer tested a theory proposed by Wally Broecker, that Lake Agassiz, a giant meltwater lake, could have caused abrupt cooling by flooding into the Atlantic. They used ocean-coupled general circulation models (GCMs) to simulate the role of ocean flows in ice ages. In one of the first climate modeling studies to investigate the stability of thermohaline circulation in the North Atlantic. Manabe and Stouffer (1988) presented a fully coupled ocean-atmosphere model, and demonstrated that it was possible for the model to reach more than one equilibrium state. One state was similar to the current climate, while the second state showed the effects of warming flows of meltwater. This Paleoclimate modelling associated changes in the circulation of the Atlantic Ocean over glacial–interglacial time periods with abrupt transitions in climate in the North Atlantic region. Further work by Manabe and Stouffer (1995) showed that meltwater could also result in a series of sharp temperature rises and falls.

This research raised concerns about the stability of the Atlantic meridional overturning circulation (AMOC) and its potential to change abruptly and to dramatically impact climate. Manabe and Stouffer (1994)'s use of a coupled atmosphere-ocean climate model suggested that anthropogenic-driven climate change could have significant impacts, an issue addressed in the Intergovernmental Panel on Climate Change (IPCC) Third Assessment.

Stouffer and Manabe showed remarkable accuracy in predicting future world-wide global patterns of warming that match patterns of warming since observed. Both "the projected surface pattern of warming, and the vertical structure of temperature change in both the atmosphere and ocean, were realistic." The first large model that demonstrated polar sensitivity in temperature effects was Manabe and Stouffer (1980). There is now high confidence that the Arctic surface will continue to warm at a higher rate than the global average during the 21st century. As early as 1988 Manabe and Stouffer's models showed pronounced impacts on tropical rainfall, but the significance of that feature of the simulations was not focused on at the time.

Stouffer has been a lead author, contributing author, and review editor on multiple reports of the Intergovernmental Panel on Climate Change, beginning with the IPCC First Assessment Report in 1990. He has been a chapter author for Working Group 1 assessment reports in 1995, 2001, and 2007 and was an expert reviewer in 2013. He has also worked on the Summary for Policymakers for Working Group I and the Summary for Policymakers for the Synthesis Report of the IPCC reports.

To write the IPCC reports, over 250 scientists and experts worldwide evaluate, synthesize, and comment on the published literature about climate change, summarizing the state of what is known from peer-reviewed studies. Their goal is to first determine consensus and then clearly identify places of disagreement and open questions. The IPCC reports clearly describe the scientific consensus that climate change is real, that it is caused by human activity, and that it urgently needs addressing. Reports go through an extensive reviewing process to create the final scientific assessment. The scientific assessment then becomes the basis for an accompanying Summary for Policymakers, approved by both contributing scientists and representatives from IPCC countries after intense scrutiny of the science and debate over what to do about the science. The Intergovernmental Panel on Climate Change (IPCC) won the 2007 Nobel Peace Prize for its work, to which Stouffer contributed.

Stouffer has been both a member and chair of the Working Group on Climate Modeling of the World Climate Research Program (1993-) and its subcommittee, the Coupled Model Intercomparison Project (CMIP). As part of his work with CMIP, he designs experiments and systems to better understand and compare different climate models. This is useful for scientists who are developing models and understanding the science, and for the IPCC, which uses the information as part of its assessment process and as a consistent way of showing the results of different models.

== Awards and honors ==
- 2016, NOAA Distinguished Career Award, “For pioneering the understanding of climate sensitivity through discovery of fundamental mechanisms and global Earth System modeling”.
- 2015, 2014, Highly Cited Researcher, Clarivate Analytics
- 2013, Department of Commerce Silver Medal, joint award, “For the development and application of NOAA’s first comprehensive Earth System Models that couple the carbon cycle and climate to project changes”.
- 2012, Fellow, American Geophysical Union
- 2012, Alumni Fellowship, Pennsylvania State University
- 2008, NOAA Administrator's Award, joint award, “for outstanding dedication to developing U.S. CCSP Synthesis and Assessment Products integrating climate research for decision support.”
- 2007, Fellow, American Meteorological Society
- 2005, Department of Commerce Bronze Medal, joint award, “For development of the NOAA Operational Model Archive and Distribution System, the first operational U.S. National climate and weather model archive”.
- 2005, Department of Commerce Silver Medal, joint award, “For delivering state-of-the-art model simulations of past, present, and future climate and for enabling open access to the data sets. Results from a recent international workshop support the conclusion that the Geophysical Fluid Dynamics Laboratory climate model is among the best in the world”.
- 2002, Department of Commerce Gold Medal, joint award, “For world-renowned scientific contributions to the recently concluded state-of-the-art assessment of the science of global change."
- 1998, International Norbert Gerbier-MUMM Prize, World Meteorological Organization

== Selected publications ==
- Stouffer, R. J.; Russell, J. L.; Beadling, R. L.; Broccoli, A. J.; Krasting, J. P.; Malyshev, S.; Naiman, Z. (15 February 2022). "The Role of Continental Topography in the Present-Day Ocean's Mean Climate". Journal of Climate. 35 (4): 1327–1346. Bibcode:2022JCli...35.1327S. doi:10.1175/JCLI-D-20-0690.1. ISSN 0894-8755. S2CID 244653696.
- Bronselaer, Ben; Winton, Michael; Griffies, Stephen M.; Hurlin, William J.; Rodgers, Keith B.; Sergienko, Olga V.; Stouffer, Ronald J.; Russell, Joellen L. (December 2018). "Change in future climate due to Antarctic meltwater". Nature. 564 (7734): 53–58. Bibcode:2018Natur.564...53B. doi:10.1038/s41586-018-0712-z. ISSN 1476-4687. PMID 30455421. S2CID 53872426.
- Stouffer, Ronald J.; Manabe, Syukuro (March 2017). "Assessing temperature pattern projections made in 1989". Nature Climate Change. 7 (3): 163–165. Bibcode:2017NatCC...7..163S. doi:10.1038/nclimate3224. ISSN 1758-6798.
- Stouffer, R. J.; Eyring, V.; Meehl, G. A.; Bony, S.; Senior, C.; Stevens, B.; Taylor, K. E. (1 January 2017). "CMIP5 Scientific Gaps and Recommendations for CMIP6". Bulletin of the American Meteorological Society. 98 (1): 95–105. Bibcode:2017BAMS...98...95S. doi:10.1175/BAMS-D-15-00013.1. hdl:11858/00-001M-0000-0028-4BB6-B. ISSN 0003-0007. S2CID 120536914.
- Eyring, Veronika; Bony, Sandrine; Meehl, Gerald A.; Senior, Catherine A.; Stevens, Bjorn; Stouffer, Ronald J.; Taylor, Karl E. (26 May 2016). "Overview of the Coupled Model Intercomparison Project Phase 6 (CMIP6) experimental design and organization". Geoscientific Model Development. 9 (5): 1937–1958. Bibcode:2016GMD.....9.1937E. doi:10.5194/gmd-9-1937-2016. hdl:11858/00-001M-0000-002A-31FA-8. ISSN 1991-959X. S2CID 18905378.
- Taylor, Karl E.; Stouffer, Ronald J.; Meehl, Gerald A. (1 April 2012). "An Overview of CMIP5 and the Experiment Design" (PDF). Bulletin of the American Meteorological Society. 93 (4): 485–498. Bibcode:2012BAMS...93..485T. doi:10.1175/BAMS-D-11-00094.1. OSTI 1183520. S2CID 53866276.
- Stouffer, R. J.; Yin, J.; Gregory, J. M.; Dixon, K. W.; Spelman, M. J.; Hurlin, W.; Weaver, A. J.; Eby, M.; Flato, G. M.; Hasumi, H.; Hu, A.; Jungclaus, J. H.; Kamenkovich, I. V.; Levermann, A.; Montoya, M.; Murakami, S.; Nawrath, S.; Oka, A.; Peltier, W. R.; Robitaille, D. Y.; Sokolov, A.; Vettoretti, G.; Weber, S. L. (15 April 2006). "Investigating the Causes of the Response of the Thermohaline Circulation to Past and Future Climate Changes". Journal of Climate. 19 (8): 1365–1387. Bibcode:2006JCli...19.1365S. doi:10.1175/JCLI3689.1. hdl:11858/00-001M-0000-0011-FCD8-D. ISSN 0894-8755. S2CID 12550171.
- Meehl, Gerald A.; Covey, Curt; McAvaney, Bryant; Latif, Mojib; Stouffer, Ronald J. (2005). "Overview of the Coupled Model Intercomparison Project". Bulletin of the American Meteorological Society. 86 (1): 89–93. ISSN 0003-0007. JSTOR 26221235.
- Manabe, Syukuro; Stouffer, Ronald J (1 January 2000). "Study of abrupt climate change by a coupled ocean–atmosphere model". Quaternary Science Reviews. 19 (1): 285–299. Bibcode:2000QSRv...19..285M. doi:10.1016/S0277-3791(99)00066-9. ISSN 0277-3791.
- Meehl, Gerald A.; Boer, George J.; Covey, Curt; Latif, Mojib; Stouffer, Ronald J. (1 February 2000). "The Coupled Model Intercomparison Project (CMIP)". Bulletin of the American Meteorological Society. 81 (2): 313–318. Bibcode:2000BAMS...81..313M. doi:10.1175/1520-0477(2000)081<0313:TCMIPC>2.3.CO;2.
- Manabe, Syukuro; Stouffer, Ronald J. (1 January 1999). "Are two modes of thermohaline circulation stable?". Tellus A: Dynamic Meteorology and Oceanography. 51 (3): 400–411. Bibcode:1999TellA..51..400M. doi:10.3402/tellusa.v51i3.13461. ISSN 1600-0870.
- Delworth, Thomas L.; Manabe, Syukuro; Stouffer, Ronald J. (1 February 1997). "Multidecadal climate variability in the Greenland Sea and surrounding regions: A coupled model simulation". Geophysical Research Letters. 24 (3): 257–260. Bibcode:1997GeoRL..24..257D. doi:10.1029/96GL03927. S2CID 8459065.
- Manabe, Syukuro; Stouffer, Ronald J. (November 1995). "Simulation of abrupt climate change induced by freshwater input to the North Atlantic Ocean". Nature. 378 (6553): 165–167. Bibcode:1995Natur.378..165M. doi:10.1038/378165a0. ISSN 1476-4687. S2CID 4302999.
- Manabe, Syukuro; Stouffer, Ronald J. (1994). "Multiple-Century Response of a Coupled Ocean–Atmosphere Model to an Increase of Atmospheric Carbon Dioxide". Journal of Climate. 7 (1): 5–23. Bibcode:1994JCli....7....5M. doi:10.1175/1520-0442(1994)007<0005:MCROAC>2.0.CO;2. ISSN 0894-8755. JSTOR 26197823.
- Stouffer, R. J.; Manabe, S.; Vinnikov, K. Ya (February 1994). "Model assessment of the role of natural variability in recent global warming". Nature. 367 (6464): 634–636. Bibcode:1994Natur.367..634S. doi:10.1038/367634a0. ISSN 1476-4687. S2CID 4319899.
- Delworth, T.; Manabe, S.; Stouffer, R. J. (1 November 1993). "Interdecadal Variations of the Thermohaline Circulation in a Coupled Ocean-Atmosphere Model". Journal of Climate. 6 (11): 1993–2011. Bibcode:1993JCli....6.1993D. doi:10.1175/1520-0442(1993)006<1993:IVOTTC>2.0.CO;2. ISSN 0894-8755.
- Manabe, Syukuro; Stouffer, Ronald J. (1 July 1993). "Century-scale effects of increased atmospheric CO2 on the ocean-atmosphere system". Nature. 364 (6434): 215–218. Bibcode:1993Natur.364..215M. doi:10.1038/364215a0. ISSN 0028-0836. S2CID 4373033.
- Stouffer, R. J.; Manabe, S.; Bryan, K. (December 1989). "Interhemispheric asymmetry in climate response to a gradual increase of atmospheric CO2". Nature. 342 (6250): 660–662. doi:10.1038/342660a0. ISSN 1476-4687. S2CID 4251851.
- Manabe, S.; Stouffer, R. J. (1 September 1988). "Two Stable Equilibria of a Coupled Ocean-Atmosphere Model". Journal of Climate. 1 (9): 841–866. Bibcode:1988JCli....1..841M. doi:10.1175/1520-0442(1988)001<0841:TSEOAC>2.0.CO;2.
- Manabe, Syukuro; Stouffer, Ronald J. (20 October 1980). "Sensitivity of a global climate model to an increase of CO2 concentration in the atmosphere". Journal of Geophysical Research: Oceans. 85 (C10): 5529–5554. doi:10.1029/JC085iC10p05529.
