= Kirk Bryan =

Kirk Bryan may refer to:

- Kirk Bryan (geologist) (1888–1950), American geologist
- Kirk Bryan (oceanographer) (born 1929), American oceanographer

== See also ==
- Brian Kirk (born 1968), Irish television director
