= GFDL (disambiguation) =

GFDL, or GNU Free Documentation License, is a license for free documentation.

GFDL may also refer to:

- Geophysical Fluid Dynamics Laboratory, a division of NOAA
- GFDL hurricane model (see: Tropical cyclone forecast model)
