= Community development =

Communities taking collective action to solve common problems

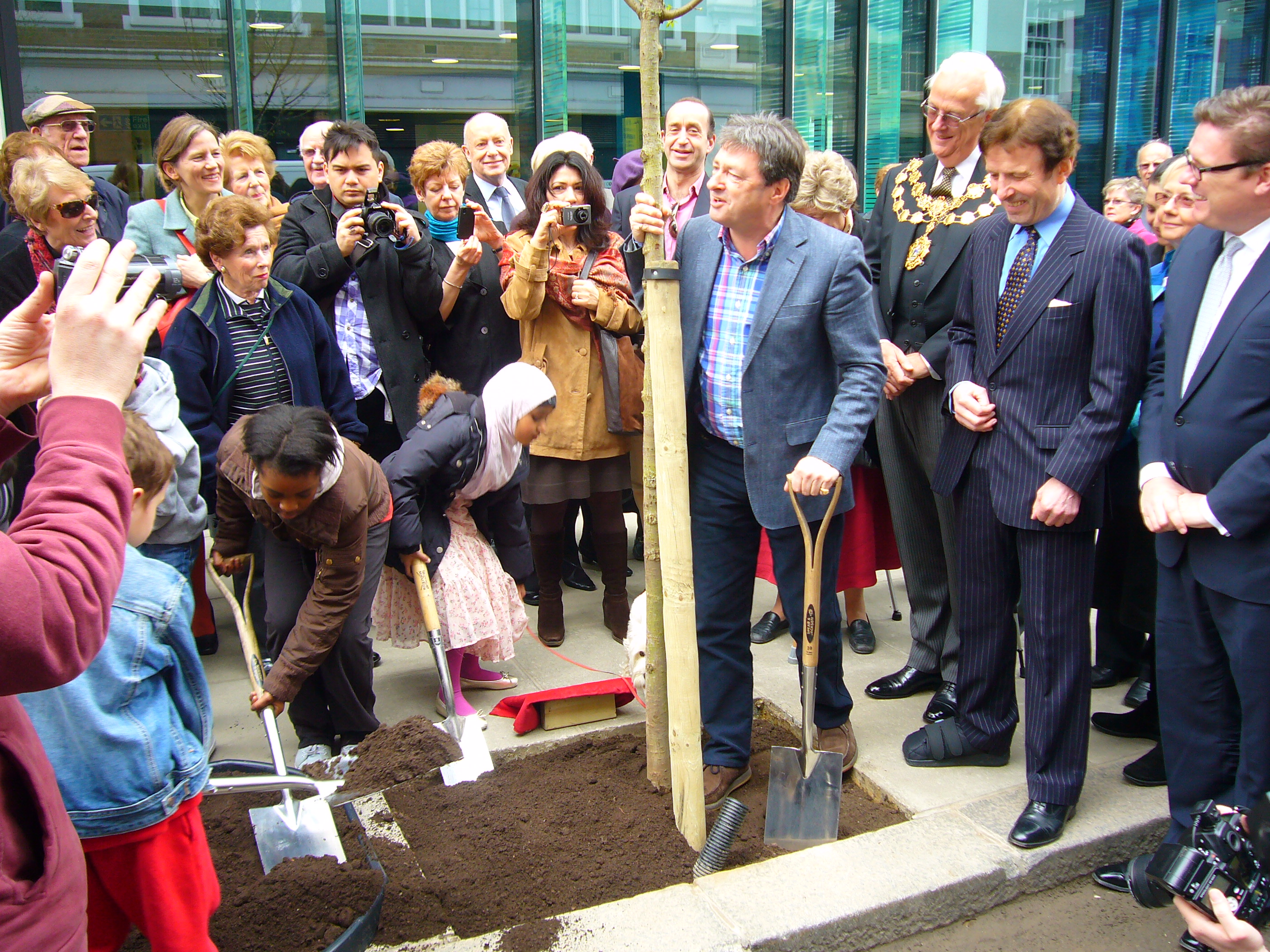
Alan Titchmarsh tree planting in London, 2011

The United Nations defines community development as "a process in which community members come together to take collective action and generate solutions to common problems." It is a broad concept, applied to the practices of civic leaders, activists, involved citizens, and professionals to improve various aspects of communities, typically aiming to build stronger and more resilient local communities.

Community development is also understood as a professional discipline, and is defined by the International Association for Community Development as "a practice-based profession and an academic discipline that promotes participative democracy, sustainable development, rights, economic opportunity, equality and social justice, through the organisation, education and empowerment of people within their communities, whether these be of locality, identity or interest, in urban and rural settings".

Community development seeks to empower individuals and groups of people with the skills they need to effect change within their communities. These skills are often created through the formation of social groups working for a common agenda. Community developers must understand both how to work with individuals and how to affect communities' positions within the context of larger social institutions.

Community development as a term has taken off widely in anglophone countries, i.e. the United States, United Kingdom, Australia, Canada, New Zealand, as well as other countries in the Commonwealth of Nations. It is also used in some countries in Eastern Europe with active community development associations in Hungary and Romania. The Community Development Journal, published by Oxford University Press, since 1966 has aimed to be the major forum for research and dissemination of international community development theory and practice.

Community development approaches are recognised internationally. These methods and approaches have been acknowledged as significant for local social, economic, cultural, environmental and political development by such organisations as the UN, WHO, OECD, World Bank, Council of Europe and EU. There are a number of institutions of higher education that offer community development as an area of study and research such as the University of Toronto, Leiden University, SOAS University of London, and the Balsillie School of International Affairs, among others.

Community development has been proposed as an effective approach to health promotion. The Ottawa Charter for Health Promotion included work to "strengthen community action" as one of its five action areas. Applications of this approach have included those focused on health inequality such as the Priority Neighbourhood Development programme in the UK

== Definitions ==
There are complementary definitions of community development.

The United Nations defines community development broadly as "a process where community members come together to take collective action and generate solutions to common problems." and the International Association for Community Development defines it as both a practice-based profession and an academic discipline. Following the adoption of the IACD definition in 2016, the association has gone on to produce International Standards for Community Development Practice. The values and ethos that should underpin practice can be expressed as: Commitment to rights, solidarity, democracy, equality, environmental and social justice. The purpose of community development is understood by IACD as being to work with communities to achieve participative democracy, sustainable development, rights, economic opportunity, equality and social justice. This practice is carried out by people in different roles and contexts, including people explicitly called professional community workers (and people taking on essentially the same role but with a different job title), together with professionals in other occupations ranging from social work, adult education, youth work, health disciplines, environmental education, local economic development, to urban planning, regeneration, architecture and more who seek to apply community development values and adopt community development methods. Community development practice also encompasses a range of occupational settings and levels from development roles working with communities, through to managerial and strategic community planning roles.

The Community Development Challenge report, which was produced by a working party comprising leading UK organizations in the field including the (now defunct) Community Development Foundation, the (now defunct) Community Development Exchange and the (now defunct) Federation for Community Development Learning defines community development as:

A set of values and practices which plays a special role in overcoming poverty and disadvantage, knitting society together at the grass roots and deepening democracy. There is a community development profession, defined by national occupational standards and a body of theory and experience going back the best part of a century. There are active citizens who use community development techniques on a voluntary basis, and there are also other professions and agencies which use a community development approach or some aspects of it.

Community Development Exchange defines community development as:

both an occupation (such as a community development worker in a local authority) and a way of working with communities. Its key purpose is to build communities based on justice, equality and mutual respect.

Community development involves changing the relationships between ordinary people and people in positions of power, so that everyone can take part in the issues that affect their lives. It starts from the principle that within any community there is a wealth of knowledge and experience which, if used in creative ways, can be channeled into collective action to achieve the communities' desired goals.

Community development practitioners work alongside people in communities to help build relationships with key people and organizations and to identify common concerns. They create opportunities for :the community to learn new skills and, by enabling people to act together, community development practitioners help to foster social inclusion and equality.

== Different approaches ==
There are numerous overlapping approaches to community development. Some focus on the processes, some on the outcomes/ objectives. They include:

- Arts, Culture, and Development; focuses on the role of arts and culture in community development, social transformation
- Community Engagement; focuses on relationships at the core of facilitating "understanding and evaluation, involvement, exchange of information and opinions, about a concept, issue or project, with the aim of building social capital and enhancing social outcomes through decision-making" (p. 173).
- Women Self-help Group; focusing on the contribution of women in settlement groups.
- Community capacity building; focusing on helping communities obtain, strengthen, and maintain the ability to set and achieve their own development objectives.
- Large Group Capacitation; an adult education and social psychology approach grounded in the activity of the individual and the social psychology of the large group focusing on large groups of unemployed or semi-employed participants, many of whom with Lower Levels of Literacy (LLLs).
- Social capital formation; focusing on benefits derived from the cooperation between individuals and groups.
- Nonviolent direct action; when a group of people take action to reveal an existing problem, highlight an alternative, or demonstrate a possible solution to a social issue which is not being addressed through traditional societal institutions (governments, religious organizations or established trade unions) to the satisfaction of the direct action participants.
- Economic development, focusing on the "development" of developing countries as measured by their economies, although it includes the processes and policies by which a nation improves the economic, political, and social well-being of its people.
- Community economic development (CED); an alternative to conventional economic development which encourages using local resources in a way that enhances economic outcomes while improving social conditions. For example, CED involves strategies which aim to improve access to affordable housing, medical, and child care.
  - A worker cooperative is a progressive CED strategy that operates as businesses both managed and owned by their employees. They are beneficial due to their potential to create jobs and providing a route for grassroots political action. Some challenges that the worker cooperative faces include the mending of the cooperative's identity as both business and as a democratic humanitarian organization. They are limited in resources and scale.
- Sustainable development; which seeks to achieve, in a balanced manner, economic development, social development and environmental protection outcomes.
- Community-driven development (CDD), an economic development model which shifts overreliance on central governments to local communities.
- Asset-based community development (ABCD); is a methodology that seeks to uncover and use the strengths within communities as a means for sustainable development.
- Faith-based community development; which utilizes faith-based organizations to bring about community development outcomes.
- Community-based participatory research (CBPR); a partnership approach to research that equitably involves, for example, community members, organizational representatives, and researchers in all aspects of the research process and in which all partners contribute expertise and share decision making and ownership, which aims to integrate this knowledge with community development outcomes.
- Community organizing; an approach that generally assumes that social change necessarily involves conflict and social struggle in order to generate collective power for the powerless.
- Participatory planning including community-based planning (CBP); involving the entire community in the strategic and management processes of urban planning; or, community-level planning processes, urban or rural.
- Town-making; or machizukuri (まちづくり) refers to a Japanese concept which is "an umbrella term generally understood as citizen participation in the planning and management of a living environment". It can include redevelopment, revitalization, and post-disaster reconstruction, and usually emphasizes the importance of local citizen participation. In recent years, cooperation between local communities and contents tourism (such as video games, anime, and manga) has also become a key driver of machizukuri in some local communities, such as the tie-up between CAPCOM's Sengoku Basara and the city of Shiroishi.
- Language revitalization focuses on the use of a language so that it serves the needs of a community. This may involve the creation of books, films and other media in the language. These actions help a small language community to preserve their language and culture.
- Methodologies focusing on the educational component of community development, including the community-wide empowerment that increased educational opportunity creates.
- Methodologies addressing the issues and challenges of the Digital divide, making affordable training and access to computers and the Internet, addressing the marginalisation of local communities that cannot connect and participate in the global Online community. In the United States, nonprofit organizations such as Per Scholas seek to "break the cycle of poverty by providing education, technology and economic opportunities to individuals, families and communities" as a path to development for the communities they serve.

There are a myriad of job titles for community development workers and their employers include public authorities and voluntary or non-governmental organisations, funded by the state and by independent grant making bodies. Since the nineteen seventies the prefix word 'community' has also been adopted by several other occupations from the police and health workers to planners and architects, who have been influenced by community development approaches.

== History ==
Amongst the earliest community development approaches were those developed in Kenya and British East Africa during the 1930s. Community development practitioners have over many years developed a range of approaches for working within local communities and in particular with disadvantaged people. Since the nineteen sixties and seventies through the various anti poverty programmes in both developed and developing countries, community development practitioners have been influenced by structural analyses as to the causes of disadvantage and poverty i.e. inequalities in the distribution of wealth, income, land, etc. and especially political power and the need to mobilise people power to affect social change. Thus the influence of such educators as Paulo Freire and his focus upon this work. Other key people who have influenced this field are Saul Alinsky (Rules for Radicals) and E. F. Schumacher (Small Is Beautiful). There are a number of international organisations that support community development, for example, Oxfam, UNICEF, The Hunger Project and Freedom from Hunger, run community development programs based upon community development initiatives for relief and prevention of malnutrition. Since 2006 the Dragon Dreaming Project Management techniques have spread to 37 countries and are engaged in an estimated 3,250 projects worldwide.

=== In the global North ===
In the 19th century, the work of the Welsh early socialist thinker Robert Owen (1771–1851), sought to develop a more perfect community. At New Lanark and at later communities such as Oneida in the USA and the New Australia Movement in Australia, groups of people came together to create utopian or intentional communities, with mixed success. Some such communities, formed ex nihilo, contrast the concepts of the development of a community at a later stage.

==== United States ====
In the United States in the 1960s, the term "community development" began to complement and generally replace the idea of urban renewal, which typically focused on physical development projects - often at the expense of working-class communities. One of the earliest proponents of the term in the United States was social scientist William W. Biddle (100-1973). In the late 1960s, philanthropies such as the Ford Foundation and government officials such as Senator Robert F. Kennedy took an interest in local nonprofit organizations. A pioneer was the Bedford Stuyvesant Restoration Corporation in Brooklyn, which attempted to apply business and management skills to the social mission of uplifting low-income residents and their neighborhoods. Eventually such groups became known as "Community development corporations" or CDCs. Federal laws, beginning with the 1974 Housing and Community Development Act, provided a way for state and municipal governments to channel funds to CDCs and to other nonprofit organizations.

National organizations such as the Neighborhood Reinvestment Corporation (founded in 1978 and known since 2005 as NeighborWorks America), the Local Initiatives Support Corporation (LISC) (founded in 1980), and the Enterprise Foundation (founded in 1981) have built extensive networks of affiliated local nonprofit organizations to which they help provide financing for numerous physical- and social-development programs in urban and rural communities. The CDCs and similar organizations have been credited by some with starting the process that stabilized and revived seemingly hopeless inner-city areas such as the South Bronx in New York City.

==== United Kingdom ====
In the UK, community development has had two main traditions. The first was as an approach for preparing for the independence of countries from the former British Empire in the 1950s and 1960s. Domestically, community development first came into public prominence with the Labour Government's anti deprivation programmes of the latter 1960s and 1970s. The main example of this activity, the CDP (Community Development Programme), piloted local area-based community development. This influenced a number of largely urban local authorities, in particular in Scotland with Strathclyde Region's major community-development programme (the largest at the time in Europe).

The Gulbenkian Foundation was a key funder of commissions and reports which influenced the development of community development in the UK from the latter 1960s to the 1980s. This included recommending that there be a national institute or centre for community development, able to support practice and to advise government and local authorities on policy. This resulted in the forma establishment in 1991 of the Community Development Foundation. In 2004 the Carnegie UK Trust established a commission of inquiry into the future of rural community development, examining such issues as land reform and climate change. Carnegie funded over sixty rural community-development action-research projects across the UK and Ireland and national and international communities of practice to exchange experiences. This included the International Association for Community Development (IACD).

In 1999 the Labour Government established a UK-wide organisation responsible for setting professional-training standards for all education and development practitioners working within local communities. This organisation, PAULO – the National Training Organisation for Community Learning and Development, was named after Paulo Freire (1921-1997). It was formally recognised by David Blunkett, the Secretary of State for Education and Employment. Its first chair was Charlie McConnell, the Chief Executive of the Scottish Community Education Council, who had played a lead role in bringing together a range of occupational interests under a single national-training standards body, including community education, community development and development education. The inclusion of community development was significant as it was initially uncertain as to whether it would join the National Training Organisation (NTO) for Social Care. The Community Learning and Development NTO represented all the main employers, trades unions, professional associations and national-development agencies working in this area across the four nations of the UK.

The new body used the wording "community learning and development" to acknowledge that all of these occupations worked primarily within local communities, and that this work encompassed not just providing less formal learning support but also a concern for the wider holistic development of those communities – socio-economically, environmentally, culturally and politically. By bringing together these occupational groups this created for the first time a single recognised employment-sector of nearly 300,000 full- and part-time paid staff within the UK, approximately 10% of these staff being full-time. The NTO continued to recognise the range of occupations within it, for example specialists who work primarily with young people, but all agreed that they shared a core set of professional approaches to their work. In 2002 the NTO became part of a wider Sector Skills Council for lifelong learning.

The UK currently hosts the only global network of practitioners and activists working towards social justice through community development approach, the International Association for Community Development (IACD). IACD, formed in the USA in 1953, moved to Belgium in 1978 and was restructured and relaunched in Scotland in 1999.

==== Canada ====
Community development in Canada has roots in the development of co-operatives, credit unions and caisses populaires. The Antigonish Movement which started in the 1920s in Nova Scotia, through the work of Doctor Moses Coady and Father James Tompkins, has been particularly influential in the subsequent expansion of community economic development work across Canada.

==== Australia ====
Community development in Australia has often focussed on Aboriginal Australian communities, and during the period of the 1980s to the early 21st century funds channelled through the Community Employment Development Program, where Aboriginal people could be employed in "a work for the dole" scheme, gave the chance for non-government organisations to apply for a full or part-time worker funded by the Department for Social Security. Dr Jim Ife, formerly of Curtin University, organised a ground-breaking text-book on community development.

=== In the "Global South" ===
Community planning techniques drawing on the history of utopian movements became important in the 1920s and 1930s in East Africa, where community development proposals were seen as a way of helping local people improve their own lives with indirect assistance from colonial authorities.

Mohandas K. Gandhi adopted African community development ideals as a basis of his South African Ashram, and then introduced it as a part of the Indian Swaraj movement, aiming at establishing economic interdependence at village level throughout India. With Indian independence, despite the continuing work of Vinoba Bhave in encouraging grassroots land reform, India under its first Prime Minister Jawaharlal Nehru adopted a mixed-economy approach, mixing elements of socialism and capitalism. During the fifties and sixties, India ran a massive community development programme with focus on rural development activities through government support. This was later expanded in scope and was called integrated rural development scheme [IRDP]. A large number of initiatives that can come under the community development umbrella have come up in recent years.

The main objective of community development in India remains to develop the villages and to help the villagers help themselves to fight against poverty, illiteracy, malnutrition, etc. The beauty of Indian model of community development lies in the homogeneity of villagers and high level of participation.

Community development became a part of the Ujamaa Villages established in Tanzania by Julius Nyerere, where it had some success in assisting with the delivery of education services throughout rural areas, but has elsewhere met with mixed success. In the 1970s and 1980s, community development became a part of "Integrated Rural Development", a strategy promoted by United Nations Agencies and the World Bank. Central to these policies of community development were:

- Adult literacy programs, drawing on the work of Brazilian educator Paulo Freire and the "Each One Teach One" adult literacy teaching method conceived by Frank Laubach.
- Youth and women's groups, following the work of the Serowe Brigades of Botswana, of Patrick van Rensburg.
- Development of community business ventures and particularly cooperatives, in part drawn on the examples of José María Arizmendiarrieta and the Mondragon Cooperatives of the Basque region of Spain
- Compensatory education for those missing out in the formal education system, drawing on the work of Open Education as pioneered by Michael Young.
- Dissemination of alternative technologies, based upon the work of E. F. Schumacher as advocated in his book Small Is Beautiful: A Study of Economics As If People Mattered
- Village nutrition programs and permaculture projects, based upon the work of Australians Bill Mollison and David Holmgren.
- Village water supply programs

In the 1990s, following critiques of the mixed success of "top down" government programs, and drawing on the work of Robert Putnam, in the rediscovery of social capital, community development internationally became concerned with social capital formation. In particular the outstanding success of the work of Muhammad Yunus in Bangladesh with the Grameen Bank from its inception in 1976, has led to the attempts to spread microenterprise credit schemes around the world. Yunus saw that social problems like poverty and disease were not being solved by the market system on its own. Thus, he established a banking system which lends to the poor with very little interest, allowing them access to entrepreneurship. This work was honoured by the 2006 Nobel Peace Prize.

Another alternative to "top down" government programs is the participatory government institution. Participatory governance institutions are organizations which aim to facilitate the participation of citizens within larger decision making and action implementing processes in society. A case study done on municipal councils and social housing programs in Brazil found that the presence of participatory governance institutions supports the implementation of poverty alleviation programs by local governments.

The "human scale development" work of Right Livelihood Award-winning Chilean economist Manfred Max Neef promotes the idea of development based upon fundamental human needs, which are considered to be limited, universal and invariant to all human beings (being a part of our human condition). He considers that poverty results from the failure to satisfy a particular human need, it is not just an absence of money. Whilst human needs are limited, Max Neef shows that the ways of satisfying human needs is potentially unlimited. Satisfiers also have different characteristics: they can be violators or destroyers, pseudosatisfiers, inhibiting satisfiers, singular satisfiers, or synergic satisfiers. Max-Neef shows that certain satisfiers, promoted as satisfying a particular need, in fact inhibit or destroy the possibility of satisfying other needs: e.g., the arms race, while ostensibly satisfying the need for protection, in fact then destroys subsistence, participation, affection and freedom; formal democracy, which is supposed to meet the need for participation often disempowers and alienates; commercial television, while used to satisfy the need for recreation, interferes with understanding, creativity and identity. Synergic satisfiers, on the other hand, not only satisfy one particular need, but also lead to satisfaction in other areas: some examples are breastfeeding; self-managed production; popular education; democratic community organizations; preventative medicine; meditation; educational games.

==== India ====
Community development in India was initiated by Government of India through Community Development Programme (CDP) in 1952. The focus of CDP was on rural communities. But, professionally trained social workers concentrated their practice in urban areas. Thus, although the focus of community organization was rural, the major thrust of Social Work gave an urban character which gave a balance in service for the program.

==== Vietnam ====
International organizations apply the term community in Vietnam to the local administrative unit, each with a traditional identity based on traditional, cultural, and kinship relations. Community development strategies in Vietnam aim to organize communities in ways that increase their capacities to partner with institutions, the participation of local people, transparency and equality, and unity within local communities.

Social and economic development planning (SDEP) in Vietnam uses top-down centralized planning methods and decision-making processes which do not consider local context and local participation. The plans created by SDEP are ineffective and serve mainly for administrative purposes. Local people are not informed of these development plans. The participatory rural appraisal (PRA) approach, a research methodology that allows local people to share and evaluate their own life conditions, was introduced to Vietnam in the early 1990s to help reform the way that government approaches local communities and development. PRA was used as a tool for mostly outsiders to learn about the local community, which did not effect substantial change.

The village/commune development (VDP/CDP) approach was developed as a more fitting approach than PRA to analyze local context and address the needs of rural communities. VDP/CDP participatory planning is centered around Ho Chi Minh's saying that "People know, people discuss and people supervise." VDP/CDP is often useful in Vietnam for shifting centralized management to more decentralization, helping develop local governance at the grassroots level. Local people use their knowledge to solve local issues. They create mid-term and yearly plans that help improve existing community development plans with the support of government organizations. Although VDP/CDP has been tested in many regions in Vietnam, it has not been fully implemented for a couple reasons. The methods applied in VDP/CDP are human resource and capacity building intensive, especially at the early stages. It also requires the local people to have an "initiative-taking" attitude. People in the remote areas where VDP/CDP has been tested have mostly passive attitudes because they already receive assistance from outsiders. There also are no sufficient monitoring practices to ensure effective plan implementation. Integrating VDP/CDP into the governmental system is difficult because the Communist Party and Central government's policies on decentralization are not enforced in reality.

Non-governmental organizations (NGO) in Vietnam, legalized in 1991, have claimed goals to develop civil society, which was essentially nonexistent prior to the Đổi Mới economic reforms. NGO operations in Vietnam do not exactly live up to their claimed goals to expand civil society. This is mainly due to the fact that NGOs in Vietnam are mostly donor-driven, urban, and elite-based organizations that employ staff with ties to the Communist Party and Central government. NGOs are also overlooked by the Vietnam Fatherland Front, an umbrella organization that reports observations directly to the Party and Central government. Since NGOs in Vietnam are not entirely non-governmental, they have been coined instead as 'VNGOs.' Most VNGOs have originated from either the state, hospital or university groups, or individuals not previously associated with any groups. VNGOs have not yet reached those most in need, such as the rural poor, due to the entrenched power networks' opposition to lobbying for issues such the rural poor's land rights. Authoritarianism is prevalent in nearly all Vietnamese civic organizations. Authoritarian practices are more present in inner-organizational functions than in organization leaders' worldviews. These leaders often reveal both authoritarian and libertarian values in contradiction. Representatives of Vietnam's NGO's stated that disagreements are normal, but conflicts within an organization should be avoided, demonstrating the one-party "sameness" mentality of authoritarian rule.

== See also ==
- Community building
- Complete communities
- Community education
- Community engagement
- Community practice
- Organization workshop
- Rural community development
- Social policy
- Urbanism
