= Multiple equilibria in the Atlantic meridional overturning circulation =

The Atlantic meridional overturning circulation (AMOC) is a large system of ocean currents, like a conveyor belt. It is driven by differences in temperature and salt content and it is an important component of the climate system. However, the AMOC is not a static feature of global circulation. It is sensitive to changes in temperature, salinity and atmospheric forcings. Climate reconstructions from δ^{18}O proxies from Greenland reveal an abrupt transition in global temperature about every 1470 years. These changes may be due to changes in ocean circulation, which suggests that there are two equilibria possible in the AMOC. Stommel made a two-box model in 1961 which showed two different states of the AMOC are possible on a single hemisphere. Stommel’s result with an ocean box model has initiated studies using three dimensional ocean circulation models, confirming the existence of multiple equilibria in the AMOC.

== The AMOC ==
The Atlantic Meridional Overturning Circulation (AMOC) is a large system of ocean currents that carry warm water from the tropics northwards into the North Atlantic. It is driven by differences in temperature and salt content. The present-day AMOC is mainly temperature-driven, which means that there is a strong AMOC characterized by sinking in the North. It is, in principle, also possible that upwelling can take place at low latitudes. This was studied by Stommel in 1961. The climate of the Northern hemisphere is influenced by the oceanic transport of heat and salt from the tropics to the sub-polar regions. The ocean releases heat to the atmosphere in the sub-polar Atlantic region. This Northward heat transport is responsible for the relatively warm climate in Northwest Europe. Changes in the strength of the AMOC are thought to have been responsible for significant changes in past climate. A collapse of the AMOC would have large consequences on the temperatures in the North-Atlantic region. It could lead to a reduction of air temperatures up to 10 °C.

== Geological record of abrupt changes in the climate ==
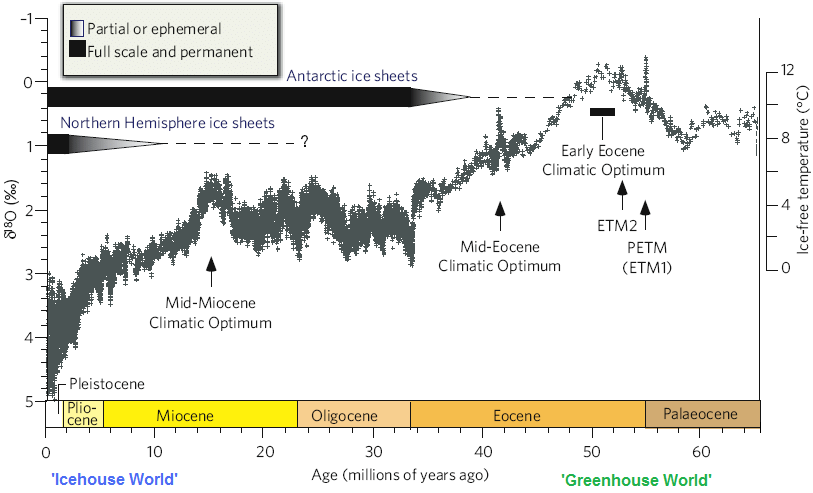
Cenozoic climate evolution based on stacked deep-sea benthic foraminiferal oxygen-isotope records.

=== The Cenozoic Era ===
The Cenozoic Era covers the period from 65.5 Ma to present. It is the most recent of the three classic geological eras (Paleozoic, Mesozoic, Cenozoic). The earth is mostly characterized as a "Greenhouse world" during the early Cenozoic times, with no ice and high temperatures. The widespread occurrence of large glaciations started on Antarctica ~34 Ma in the Eocene-Oligocene transition (EOT). During this time, the world became an "Icehouse world" like we know it today, with ice sheets present in both poles simultaneously.

=== Dansgaard-Oeschger events ===
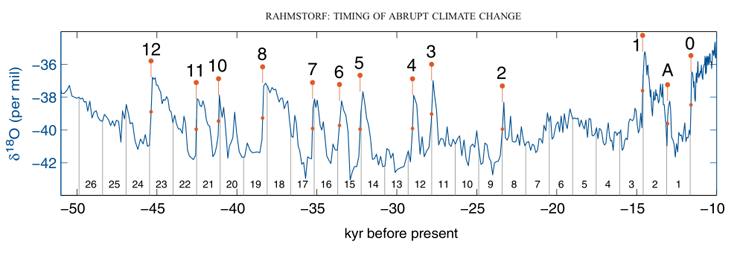
The Dansgaard-Oeschger cycle. Dividing the 50-10 kyr before present period in boxes of 1470 years clearly shows the periodicity of the DO-cycle. The DO-events are numbered.

There are also abrupt changes in the climate in the last glacial period. Willi Dansgaard analyzed the isotopic composition of ice cores from Camp Century in Greenland in 1972. He reported that the last glacial period showed more than 20 abrupt interstadials marked by very intense warming. Hans Oeschger reported 12 years later that the abrupt changes were accompanied by sudden increases in CO_{2} in the Greenland ice cores. These abrupt and dramatic changes in climate were from then on known as Dansgaard-Oeschger events (DO-events) and they occur approximately every 1470 years. Paleo-proxy records from δ^{18}O proxies have been linked to the evidence of temperature fluctuations of this magnitude. The cause for these fluctuations is still uncertain, but recent research suggests that they are due to changes in ocean circulation. These changes could be induced by North Atlantic freshwater perturbations.

== Stommel box model ==
Several simple box models were used to study the changes in AMOC caused by for example changes in freshwater fluxes or salinity fluxes. Stommel was the first one to do so and devised a single-hemispheric box model in 1961 (Stommel box model). He made this model to explore the existence of stable responses to a constant forcing with either a temperate-driven or a salinity-driven AMOC. Stommel made use of a fundamental assumption that the strength of AMOC is linearly proportional to the equator–pole density difference. This assumption implies that AMOC is driven by surface thermohaline forcing.

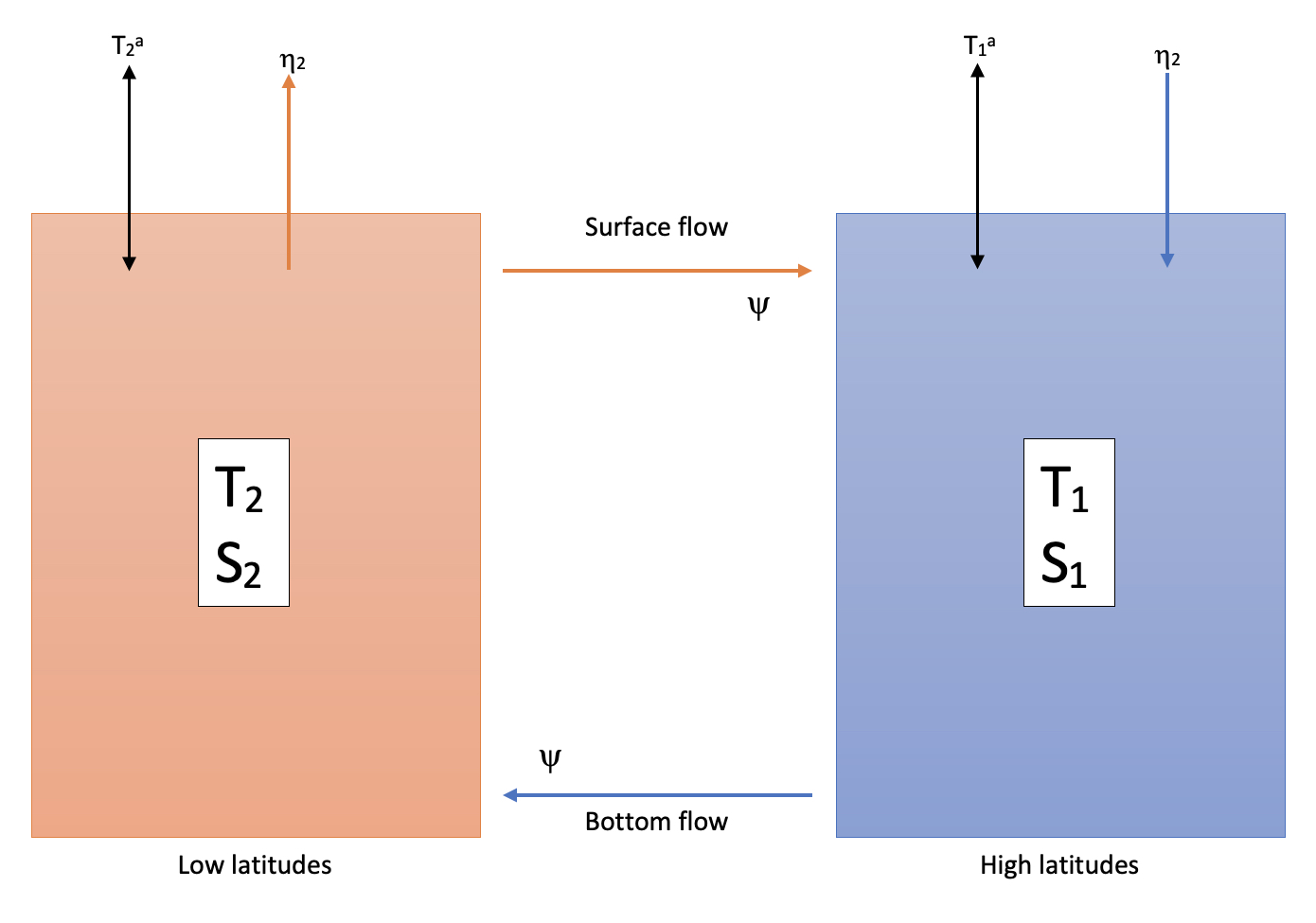
Schematic of the Stommel two-box model.

The model consists of two boxes. One box is at a high latitude (polar box) and the other one is at a low latitude (equatorial box).

The high-latitude box has uniform temperature and salinity (T_{1},S_{1}), this holds as well for the equatorial box (T_{2},S_{2}). A linear equation of state is assumed:

$\rho = \rho_0 - \alpha (T - T_0) + \beta (S - S_0)$,

where ρ_{0}, T_{0} and S_{0} are the reference density, temperature and salinity, respectively.

The thermal and haline coefficients are indicated by α and β. As said before, the flow strength between the boxes is set by the density difference between the boxes:

$\psi = k(\rho_1 - \rho_2)$,

where k is a hydraulic pumping constant.

Each box exchanges heat with the atmosphere. The atmospheric temperatures (T_{1}^{a},T_{2}^{a}) are fixed in this model. The evaporated water (η_{2} ≥ 0) in the equatorial box is precipitated, via the atmosphere, in the high-latitude box.

The governing differential equations for the temperatures and salinities in the Stommel box model are:

${dT_1\over dt} = |\psi | \Delta T + \lambda_T(T_1^a - T_1)$

${dT_2\over dt} = -|\psi | \Delta T + \lambda_T(T_2^a - T_2)$

${dS_1\over dt} = |\psi | \Delta S - \eta_2$

${dS_2\over dt} = -|\psi | \Delta S + \eta_2$

In these relations λ_{T} is the thermal exchange coefficient with the atmosphere, $\Delta T = T_2 - T_1$ and $\Delta S = S_2 - S_1$. From this it follows that:

$\psi = k(\alpha \Delta T - \beta \Delta S)$.

There is a poleward surface flow if $\psi > 0$ and an equatorward surface flow if $\psi < 0$. Under the assumption of a steady state for T_{1} and T_{2}, the flow strength is:

$\psi = k(\alpha \Delta T^a - \beta \Delta S)$.

Here $\Delta T^a = T_2^a - T_1^a$. It follows that the time evolution of the flow strength is given by:

${d\psi\over dt} = -2|\psi | \psi + 2k\alpha \Delta T^a|\psi | - 2k\beta \eta_2$

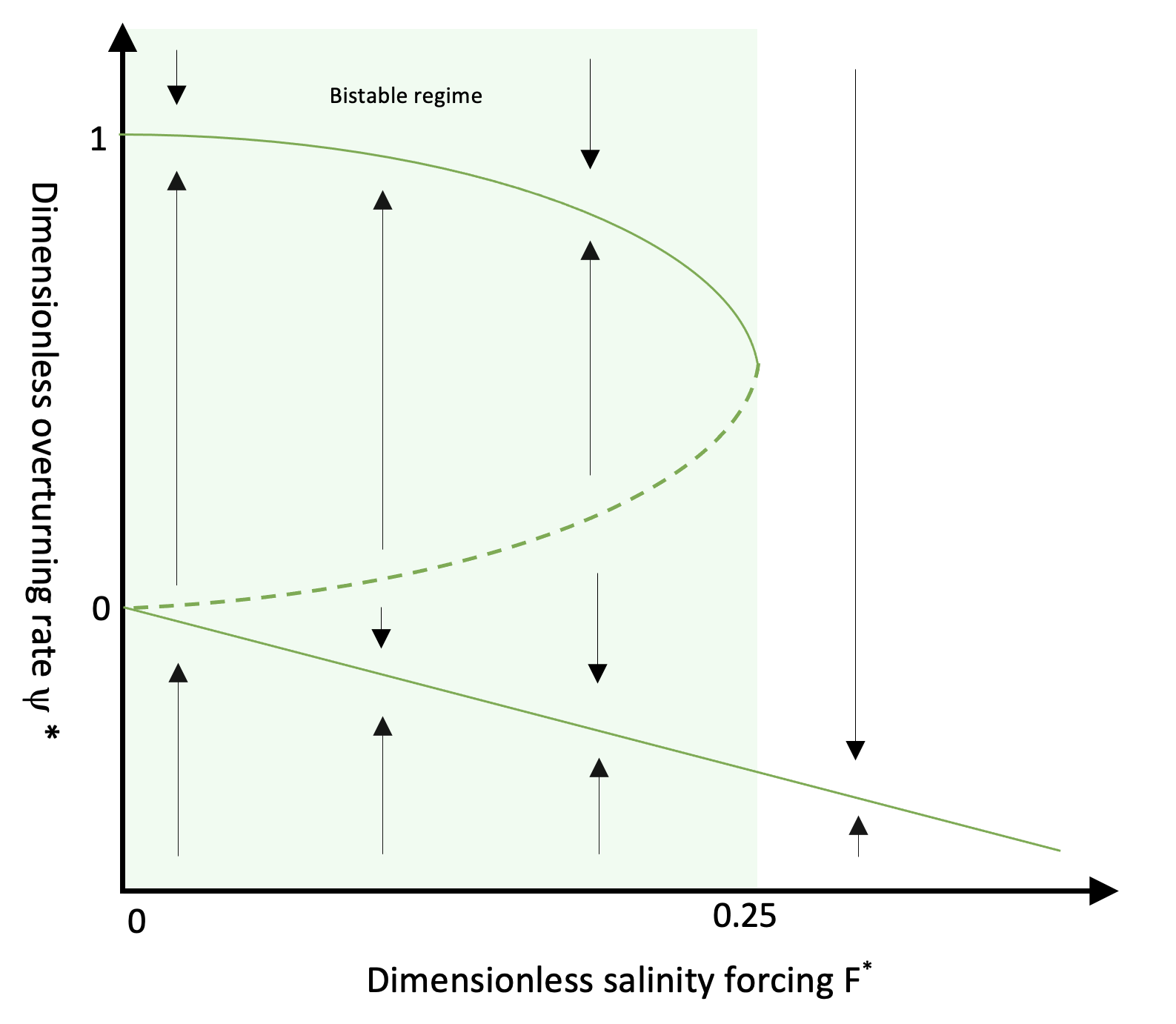
Solution of the Stommel two-box model. Here the dimensionless overturning rate $\psi^*$ is plotted against the dimensionless salinity forcing $F^*$. For $F^*$ smaller than 0.25, the overturning is bistable. The solution with the solid line is stable and the solution with the dashed line is unstable.

The steady state of the flow strength is then given by:

$\psi_{1,2} = \tfrac{k \alpha \Delta T^a}{2} \pm \sqrt{\tfrac{k \alpha \Delta T^a}{2} - k \beta \eta_2}$ for $\psi > 0$ and

$\psi_{3,4} = \tfrac{k \alpha \Delta T^a}{2} \pm \sqrt{\tfrac{k \alpha \Delta T^a}{2} + k \beta \eta_2}$ for $\psi < 0$.

The solution of $\psi_3$ is not physically possible, because it contradicts the assumption that $\psi_3 < 0$.

These formulas for the flow strength can be made dimensionless by setting $\psi^* = \frac{\psi}{k \alpha \Delta T^a}$ and $F^* = \frac{\beta \eta_2}{k(\alpha \Delta T^a)^2}$, which gives:

$\psi_{1,2}^* = \frac{1}{2} \pm \sqrt{\frac{1}{4} -F^*}$

$\psi_{4}^* = \frac{1}{2} - \sqrt{\frac{1}{4} + F^*}$

Solutions with $\psi^* > 0$ represent solutions with sinking in the polar box (high latitudes) and solutions with $\psi^* < 0$ represent solutions with sinking in the equatorial box (low latitudes). The solutions of $\psi_{1}^*$ and $\psi_{4}^*$ are stable and the solution of $\psi_{2}^*$ is unstable. This means that there are two stable states (equilibria) of the AMOC possible on a single hemisphere for a certain range of the salinity forcing.

In the present-day, we have a circulation on the positive branch with $\psi^* > 0$. If we were to switch to a circulation on the negative branch with $\psi^* < 0$, the oceanic heat transport to the Northern Hemisphere would weaken and the air temperatures would drop. The cooling would be largest in the North Atlantic region and could lead to a reduction of air temperatures in Northwest Europe of up to 10 °C.

== Switching between branches ==
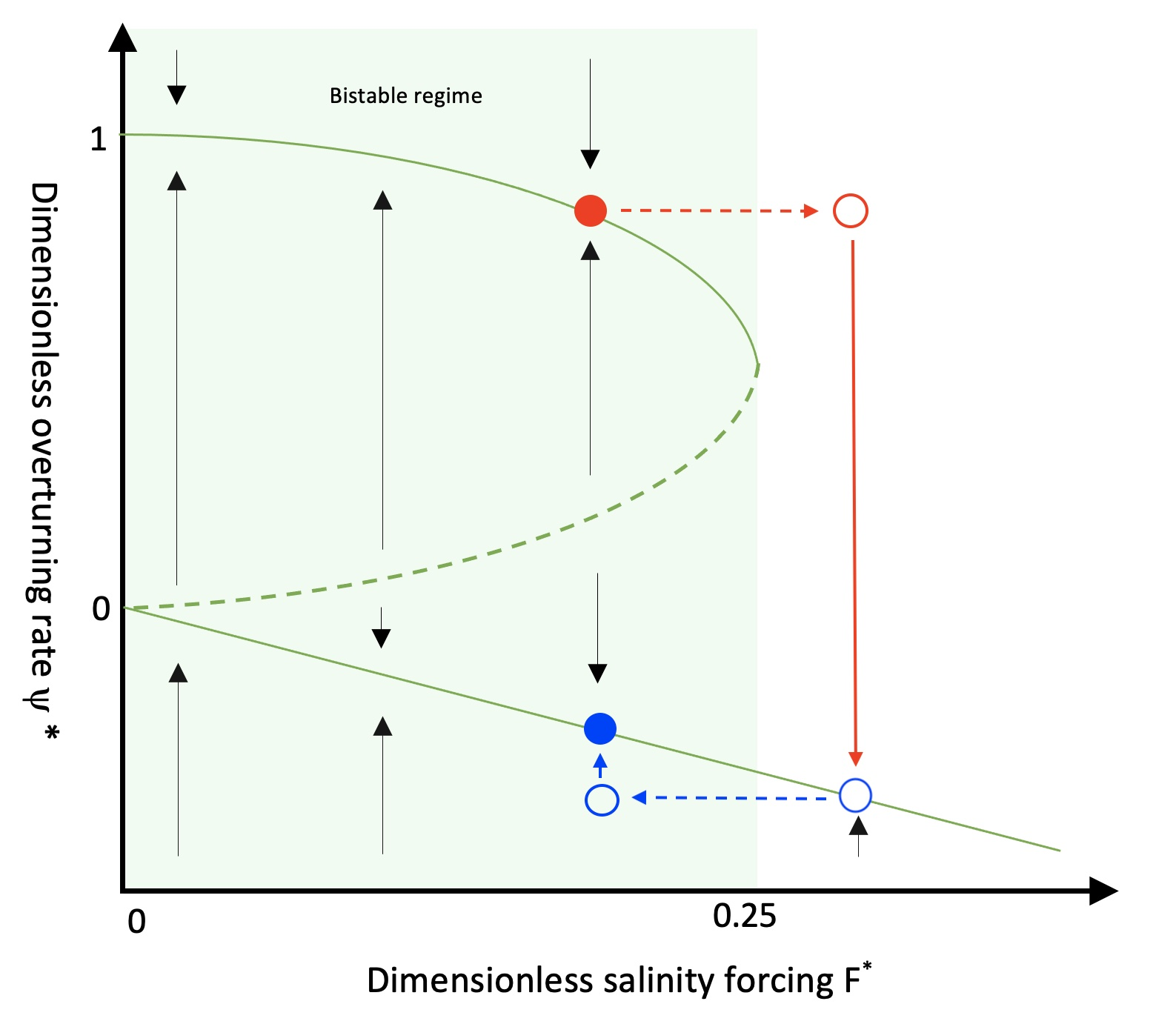
Hosing experiment on the Stommel two-box model. The filled dots are two possible equilibria for the same salinity forcing. An instantaneous surface forcing is applied to the red dot. This brings the system to the stable branch of the negative $\psi^*$. Next, the perturbation is removed. This puts the system back into the bi-stable regime of $F^*$, but on the other branch (the blue dot). The red lines indicate the instantaneous perturbation. The blue lines indicate the removed perturbation.

Stommel proved the possibility of two equilibria on a single hemisphere. Next, it is important to investigate how these stable states react to changes in the salinity forcing or freshwater forcing. An example of a change in forcing could be enhanced precipitation or evaporation.

=== Hosing experiment ===
One way to go from one equilibrium to the other is by a “hosing” experiment. Here, an instantaneous surface forcing perturbation is applied. This moves the system to the stable branch of the negative $\psi^*$. Next, the perturbation is removed. This puts the system back into the bistable regime of $F^*$, but on the other branch. This gives two different steady states for the same dimensionless salinity forcing.

=== Traditional hysteresis experiment ===
Another strategy is the traditional hysteresis experiment. Here, the forcing is gradually increased. This allows the system to follow the positive branch to the negative branch. The AMOC quickly collapses when it reaches the threshold of $F^*$. From here it goes to the negative branch of $\psi^*$. After reaching the negative branch, the forcing is slowly reduced again. This makes the system go the other equilibrium. When the forcing is reduced even further, the AMOC will transition again to the positive branch of $\psi^*$.

=== Redistributing salt experiment ===
A third strategy is an experiment where the initial state is perturbed by redistributing salt in the ocean interior. This strategy leaves the salinity forcing unchanged. If the perturbation is large enough, the AMOC will collapse. This will make the system transition to the negative branch of $\psi^*$.

== Examples of multiple equilibria in the ocean ==
Stommel’s result with an ocean box model has initiated studies using three dimensional ocean circulation models, confirming the existence of multiple equilibria. The full range of possible equilibria in the ocean has not been well explored yet. Besides Stommel's box model and three dimensional models, paleoclimatic evidence also suggests that variations in the AMOC are linked to abrupt climate changes.

=== In the past ===
==== Dansgaard-Oeschger events ====
Dansgaard-Oeschger events are the most relevant paleoclimate phenomena associated with the instability of the AMOC in the past. They occur approximately every 1470 years. Recent research suggests that they are due to changes in ocean circulation. These changes could be induced by North Atlantic freshwater perturbations.

==== Eocene-Oligocene Transition (EOT) ====
An example of a switch between two equilibria in the AMOC is the Eocene-Oligocene transition (EOT) 34 MA ago, where proxies of the deep circulation suggest the onset of the AMOC. This caused a major shift in the global climate towards colder and drier conditions. It also caused the formation of the Antarctic ice sheet. This colder and drier climate caused the large scale extinction of flora and fauna in what is called the Eocene–Oligocene extinction event. It is suggested that the shift from one equilibrium to the other is caused by a long term decrease in atmospheric CO_{2}.

=== In the future ===
Due to the building evidence of abrupt climate change due to multiple equilibria in the AMOC, the interest grew in the possibility of such events in the present climate. The recent anthropogenic forcing of the climate system may apply a forcing to the AMOC of similar magnitude to that associated with freshwater forcing in the glacial past. Like in paleoceanographic models, the mechanism and likelihood of collapse have been investigated using climate models. Most present-day climate models already predict a gradual weakening of the AMOC over the 21st century due to anthropogenic forcing, although there is large uncertainty in the amount of decrease. Some researchers even argue that such a gradual slowdown has already started and that it is visible in the proxy records of the AMOC from the mid-twentieth century. In the Fifth Assessment Report of the Intergovernmental Panel on Climate Change they identify a collapse of the AMOC as one of the tipping points in the climate system with a low probability of occurrence, but with a potentially high impact.

== See also ==
- Atlantic Meridional Overturning Circulation
- Abrupt climate change
