= Jerry D. Mahlman =

American meteorologist and climatologist (1940–2012)

- Born: February 21, 1940; Crawford, Nebraska
- Died: November 28, 2012 (aged 72); Buffalo Grove, Illinois
- Education: Colorado State University, Chadron State College
- Spouse: Janet Hilgenberg
- Children: Gary Mahlman, Julie Kapecki
- Scientific career
- Fields: Climatology
- Workplaces: Geophysical Fluid Dynamics Laboratory, NCAR
- Thesis: Atmospheric general circulation and transport of radioactive debris (1967)

Jerry Mahlman (February 21, 1940 – November 28, 2012) was an American meteorologist and climatologist.

== Biography ==
Mahlman was born on February 21, 1940, in Crawford, Nebraska, and received his undergraduate degree from Chadron State College in 1962 and his Ph.D. from Colorado State University in 1967. From 1970 until 2000, he worked at the Geophysical Fluid Dynamics Laboratory of the National Oceanic and Atmospheric Administration at Princeton, serving as director from 1984-2000. He was most recently a Senior Research Associate at the National Center for Atmospheric Research. Mahlman died on November 28, 2012, in Buffalo Grove, Illinois, at the age of 72.

Mahlman was a pioneer in the use of computational models of the atmosphere to examine the interactions between atmospheric chemistry and physics. His early work focussed on understanding the distribution of fallout from atmospheric nuclear bomb tests. He then became interested in the physics of transport in the stratosphere, in which mixing is relatively weak and parcels of air can be tracked for long periods of time. At the Geophysical Fluid Dynamics Laboratory, Mahlman collaborated with Syukoro Manabe to develop dynamical models of the stratospheric circulation that demonstrated the importance of meanders in the polar jet stream for producing exchange between the polar and subtropical stratosphere. He then worked to extend these models to include the chemistry of nitrous oxide and ozone. While Mahlman was skeptical of early works that suggested that chlorofluorocarbons were responsible for depleting the ozone layer, measurements of high levels of free chlorine in the ozone hole caused him to change his mind in late 1987, and he later was one of the first to sound the alarm about ozone depletion over the Arctic.

As director of the Geophysical Fluid Dynamics Laboratory, he became involved in interpreting the results of computer models of global warming for the public and policymakers. On the topic of climate change before the U.S. Senate Committee on Commerce, Science, and Transportation on March 3, 2004, he said:

Global warming is real and is a phenomenon that humans have created. Climate scientists worldwide have understood its essence since the so-called "Charney Report" of the National Research Council 25 years ago. Our burning of fossil fuels (coal, oil, and natural gas) is the indisputably direct cause of the ever-increasing concentrations of carbon dioxide in the atmosphere. This added carbon dioxide acts directly to warm the planet. There is no scientific controversy about these facts. The eventual warming amounts for Earth are expected to be substantial, but with some remaining uncertainty concerning how much warming we will receive for given scenarios of future amounts of carbon dioxide, and other "greenhouse" gases... A doubling of atmospheric carbon dioxide amounts is expected to occur within this century... Another 3-6 degrees Fahrenheit global warming is expected to occur this century, with continued warming thereafter ... Tropical storms are expected on average to have stronger winds, and much more rain... I do, however, believe that it is scientists' obligation to communicate the science of global warming, including its remaining uncertainties, to leaders and stakeholders, worldwide. I would also argue that it is our responsibility to offer our science-based perspectives on the available policy options, as well as their strengths and weaknesses.

Mahlman received numerous awards and honors, including the Carl-Gustaf Rossby Research Medal of the American Meteorology Society, the Gold Medal of the United States Department of Commerce, and the Presidential Rank Award of Distinguished Executive, the highest honor awarded to a federal employee.
