= Rong Zhang =

Chinese-American physicist and climate scientist

- Education: Massachusetts Institute of Technology; Boston University; Tsinghua University
- Scientific career
- Workplaces: Princeton University; National Oceanic and Atmospheric Administration
- Thesis: Self sustained thermohaline oscillations and their implications for biogeochemical cycles (2001)

Rong Zhang is a Chinese-American physicist and climate scientist at the National Oceanic and Atmospheric Administration. Her research considers the impact of Atlantic meridional overturning circulation on climate phenomena. She was elected Fellow of the American Meteorological Society in 2018 and appointed their Bernhard Haurwitz Memorial Lecturer in 2020.

== Early life and education ==
Zhang was born in China. She attended Tsinghua University, where she studied electronic engineering. After graduating, she moved to Boston University, where she worked toward a graduate degree in physics. She became interested in careers that combined fundamental science with societal impact. She was a doctoral researcher at Massachusetts Institute of Technology working on climate science.

== Research and career ==
Zhang joined Princeton University as a postdoctoral fellow in the program in Atmospheric and Oceanic Sciences (AOS). The AOS is a partnership between Princeton and the Geophysical Fluid Dynamics Laboratory (GFDL). She has investigated the role of Atlantic meridional overturning circulation (AMOC) on Atlantic Multidecadal Variability. She has said that this variability could slow the pace of Arctic summer sea icea loss.

Zhang showed that the sea in the Gulf of Maine has warmed faster than 99% of the global ocean, which results in changes in the distribution and species composition. Her climate models, which use a 10 km ocean grid, have ten times the resolution of those developed by the Intergovernmental Panel on Climate Change. She showed that warming in the Northwest Atlantic increases salinity because of a change in water mass distribution (the Labrador Current retreats and the Gulf Stream shifts northerly).

In 2018, Zhang was elected a Fellow of the American Meteorological Society. She was appointed their Bernhard Haurwitz Memorial Lecturer in 2020.

== Selected publications ==
- Thomas L. Delworth; Anthony J. Broccoli; Anthony Rosati; et al. (March 2006). "GFDL's CM2 Global Coupled Climate Models. Part I: Formulation and Simulation Characteristics". Journal of Climate. 19 (5): 643–674. doi:10.1175/jcli3629.1. ISSN 0894-8755. Wikidata Q58068830.
- Hai Cheng; R Lawrence Edwards; Wallace S Broecker; George H Denton; Xinggong Kong; Yongjin Wang; Rong Zhang; Xianfeng Wang (1 October 2009). "Ice age terminations". Science. 326 (5950): 248–252. doi:10.1126/science.1177840. ISSN 0036-8075. PMID 19815769. Wikidata Q47268424.
- Rong Zhang; Thomas L. Delworth (2006). "Impact of Atlantic multidecadal oscillations on India/Sahel rainfall and Atlantic hurricanes". Geophysical Research Letters. 33 (17). Bibcode:2006GeoRL..3317712Z. doi:10.1029/2006gl026267. ISSN 0094-8276. Wikidata Q56873330.
