= Thomas Knutson =

Research meteorologist

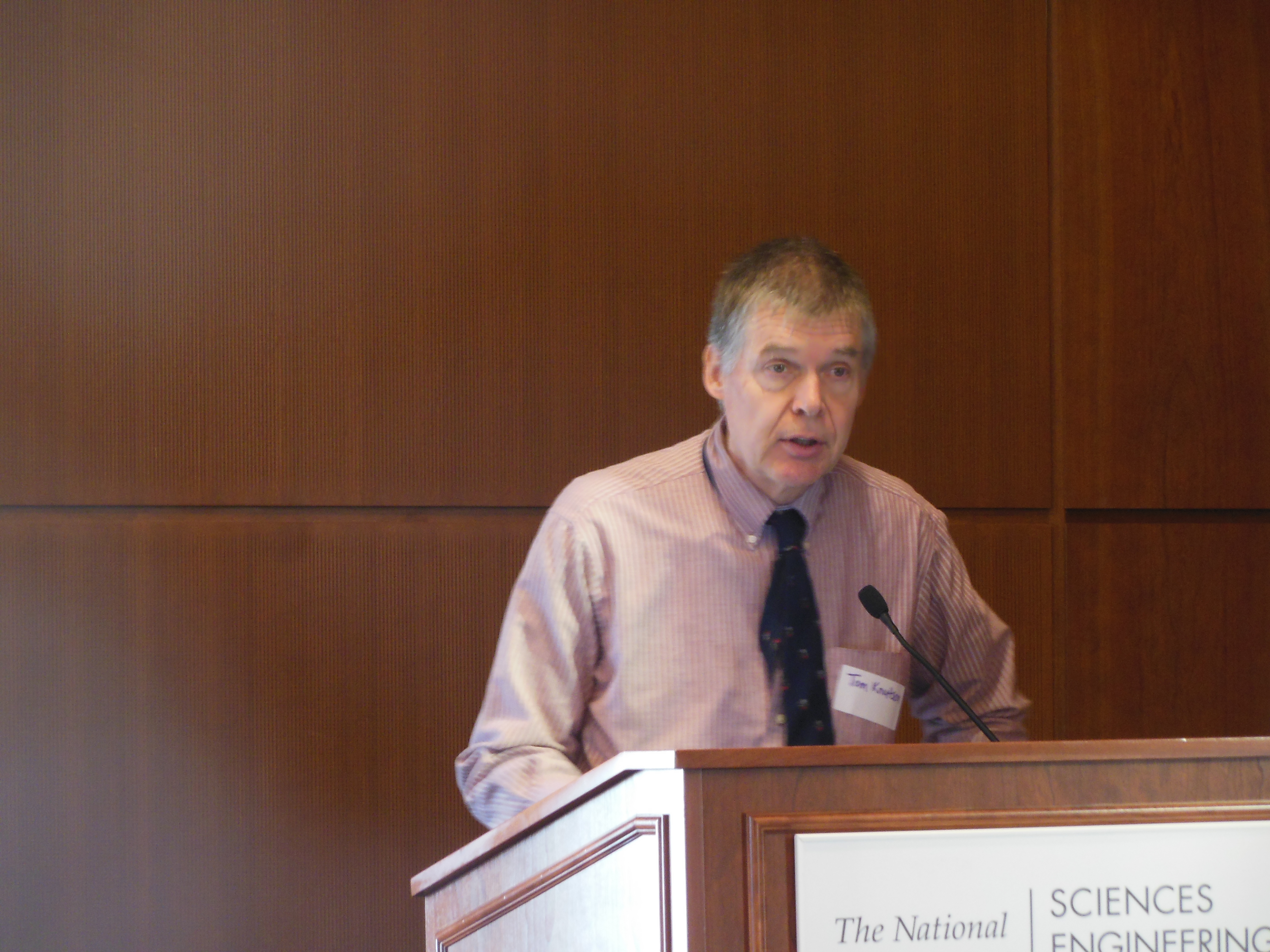
Tom Knutson 0933

Thomas R. Knutson is a climate modeller at the US Geophysical Fluid Dynamics Laboratory, a division of the National Oceanic and Atmospheric Administration (NOAA). His research covers hurricane activity, the link between climate change and hurricane incidence and intensity, and climate change detection and attribution.

== Biography ==
He served as a contributing author on working group 1 of the IPCC Fourth Assessment Report. He is an Associate Editor of the American Meteorological Society's Journal of Climate. He has published in Science, Proceedings of the National Academy of Sciences, Journal of Geophysical Research, Journal of Climate, Tropical Cyclone Research and Review, Tellus A and the Bulletin of the American Meteorological Society.

In 2004, Knutson published a paper suggesting that increases in atmospheric carbon dioxide would lead to more intense hurricanes. This finding was subsequently supported by independent research. Knutson was invited to discuss his thesis on Ron Reagan's MSNBC talk show, but the invitation was withdrawn after the White House intervened.

== Selected works ==
- Delworth, Thomas L.; Broccoli, Anthony J.; Rosati, Anthony; Stouffer, Ronald J.; Balaji, V.; Beesley, John A.; Cooke, William F.; Dixon, Keith W.; Dunne, John; Dunne, K. A.; Durachta, Jeffrey W.; Findell, Kirsten L.; Ginoux, Paul; Gnanadesikan, Anand; Gordon, C. T.; Griffies, Stephen M.; Gudgel, Rich; Harrison, Matthew J.; Held, Isaac M.; Hemler, Richard S.; Horowitz, Larry W.; Klein, Stephen A.; Knutson, Thomas R.; Kushner, Paul J.; Langenhorst, Amy R.; Lee, Hyun-Chul; Lin, Shian-Jiann; Lu, Jian; Malyshev, Sergey L.; et al. (2006). "GFDL's CM2 Global Coupled Climate Models. Part I: Formulation and Simulation Characteristics". Journal of Climate. 19 (5): 643–674. Bibcode:2006JCli...19..643D. doi:10.1175/JCLI3629.1.
- Knutson, Thomas R.; Tuleya, Robert E. (2004). "Impact of CO2-Induced Warming on Simulated Hurricane Intensity and Precipitation: Sensitivity to the Choice of Climate Model and Convective Parameterization". Journal of Climate. 17 (18): 3477–3495. Bibcode:2004JCli...17.3477K. doi:10.1175/1520-0442(2004)017<3477:IOCWOS>2.0.CO;2. ISSN 1520-0442. S2CID 13407628.
