= Community Development Exchange =

Former British non-profit organisation

The Community Development Exchange (CDX), was a British not for profit membership organisation for individuals, organisations and networks who work in communities and are involved in community development. CDX worked to influence government policy and develop the skills of those working with communities by acting as an information exchange and to articulate the concerns of communities and community development practitioners. CDX was a registered charity (1085702), based in Sheffield, South Yorkshire.

In 1987, Standing Conference for Community Development (SCCD) was founded and formally inaugurated in February 1991 as an incorporated association. It became a charitable company limited by guarantee on 16 December 1999. SCCD received funding from the Office for Civil Society (OCS) from 2001. On 27 October 2003, SCCD changed its name to Community Development Exchange. Funding ended in March 2011, due to its losing its status as a Strategic Partner of Government. CDX operated on the OCS's reserves until its closure in December 2012. Its last Chief Executive Officer was Nick Beddow.

CDX supported the development of Our Society, a community-based network, focusing on the Big Society. CDX was also a founding member of the online National Community Activists Network (NatCAN) to provide a platform for community activists to share news and ideas.
