= EdGCM =

The Educational Global Climate Model or EdGCM is a fully functional global climate model (GCM) that was ported for use on desktop computers (Windows PCs and Macs) for use in education. It operates through a graphical user interface and is integrated with a relational database and scientific visualization utilities, all of which aim at helping improve the quality of teaching and understanding of climatology by making real-world research experiences more accessible. EdGCM was designed to permit teachers and students to conduct in-depth investigations of past, present and future climate scenarios in a manner that is essentially identical to the techniques used by national and international climate research organizations.

Components of the EdGCM suite include forms to set up climate model experiments, a control panel to run, pause, and stop the GCM, tools to post-process raw computer output into meaningful climate data, scientific visualization software, and utilities for organizing data, images, and experiment sets.

EdGCM was developed at the Goddard Institute for Space Studies as a joint project of Columbia University and NASA scientists and programmers. The Global Climate Model at the core of EdGCM is GISS Model II . During the 1980s and early 1990s, this GCM was one of NASA's primary climate research tools. Results from the model have appeared in hundreds of scientific publications.

The coarser resolution of the climate model in EdGCM (8° x 10°, latitude x longitude) makes it computationally less expensive to run. But because it contains most of the key atmospheric physics of modern GCMs, EdGCM was also used by climate researchers who do not have access to the most recent GCM versions.

As of July 2023, development of EdGCM was continued. Developers were continuing work on a cloud-based version called EzGCM.

== See also ==
- NASA Goddard Institute for Space Studies
- NCAR Community Climate System Model
- NOAA GFDL CM2.X
- Earth Simulator
- HadCM3 - explanation of an AOGCM
