= Modular Ocean Model =

Three-dimensional ocean circulation model for studying the ocean climate system

Modular Ocean Model (MOM)
- Developer: NOAA/GFDL
- Release: December 5, 1990; 35 years ago (MOM1)
- Stable release: 5.1.0 / March 25, 2014; 12 years ago
- Preview release: MOM6
- Written in: Fortran
- Type: Computer simulation
- License: GNU General Public License
- Website: gfdl.noaa.gov/mom-ocean-model

The Modular Ocean Model (MOM) is a three-dimensional ocean circulation model designed primarily for studying the ocean climate system. The model is developed and supported primarily by researchers at the National Oceanic and Atmospheric Administration's Geophysical Fluid Dynamics Laboratory (NOAA/GFDL) in Princeton, NJ, USA.

== Overview ==
MOM has traditionally been a level-coordinate ocean model, in which the ocean is divided into boxes whose bottoms are located at fixed depths. Such a representation makes it easy to solve the momentum equations and the well-mixed, weakly stratified layer known as the ocean mixed layer near the ocean surface. However, level coordinate models have problems when it comes to the representation of thin bottom boundary layers (Winton et al., 1998) and thick sea ice. Additionally, because mixing in the ocean interior is largely along lines of constant potential density rather than along lines of constant depth, mixing must be rotated relative to the coordinate grid- a process that can be computationally expensive. By contrast, in codes which represent the ocean in terms of constant-density layers (which represent the flow in the ocean interior much more faithfully)- representation of the ocean mixed layer becomes a challenge.

MOM3, MOM4, and MOM5 are used as a code base for the ocean component of the GFDL coupled models used in the IPCC assessment reports, including the GFDL CM2.X physical climate model series and the ESM2M Earth System Model. Versions of MOM have been used in hundreds of scientific papers by authors around the world. MOM4 is used as the basis for the El Nino prediction system employed by the National Centers for Environmental Prediction.

As of 2013, MOM used the Arakawa B-grid, but MOM6, the ocean component of GFDL's OM4.0 model, uses the C-grid.

== History ==
MOM owes its genesis to work at GFDL in the late 1960s by Kirk Bryan and Michael Cox. This code, along with a version generated at GFDL and UCLA/NCAR by Bert Semtner, is the ancestor of many of the level-coordinate ocean model codes run around the world today. In the late 1980s, Ron Pacanowski, Keith Dixon, and Tony Rosati at GFDL rewrote the Bryan-Cox-Semtner code in a modular form, enabling different options and configurations to be more easily generated and new physical parameterizations to be more easily included. This version, released on December 5, 1990, became known as Modular Ocean Model v1.0 (MOM1). Further development by Pacanowski, aided by Charles Goldberg and encouraged by community feedback, led to the release of v2.0 (MOM2) in 1995. Pacanowski and Stephen Griffies released v3.0 (MOM3) in 1999. Griffies, Matthew Harrison, Rosati and Pacanowski, with considerable input from a scientific community of hundreds of users, resulted in significant evolution of the code released as v4.0 (MOM4) in 2003. An update, v4.1 (MOM4p1) was released by Griffies in 2009, as was the latest version v5.0 (MOM5), which was released in 2012.

== See also ==
- Geophysical Fluid Dynamics Laboratory
