= Geophysical Fluid Dynamics Laboratory Coupled Model =

Geophysical Fluid Dynamics Laboratory Coupled Model (GFDL CM2.5) is a coupled atmosphere–ocean general circulation model (AOGCM) developed at the NOAA Geophysical Fluid Dynamics Laboratory in the United States. It is one of the leading climate models used in the Fourth Assessment Report of the IPCC, along with models developed at the Max Planck Institute for Climate Research, the Hadley Centre and the National Center for Atmospheric Research.

== Composition ==
Atmosphere

The atmospheric component of the CM2.X models employs a 24-level atmosphere with horizontal resolution of 2° in east–west and 2.5° in north–south directions. This resolution is sufficient to resolve the large mid-latitude cyclones responsible for weather variability. It is too coarse, however, to resolve processes such as hurricanes or intense thunderstorm outbreaks. The atmosphere includes a representation of radiative fluxes, mixing in the atmospheric boundary layer, representations of the impacts of stratus and cumulus clouds, a scheme for representing drag on upper level winds caused by gravity waves, changes in the spatial distribution of ozone and the ability to represent the impact of multiple greenhouse gases.

Ocean

The ocean component is a 50-level ocean, run at a resolution of 1° in the east–west direction and varying in the north–south direction from 1 degree in the polar regions to 1/3 of a degree along the equator. This resolution is sufficient to resolve the equatorial current system, but is too coarse to capture the highly energetic mesoscale eddies- whose advective and diffusive effects are parameterized. Other key parameterizations include a free surface height that changes in response to evaporation, precipitation, and convergence of ocean currents, absorption of sunlight tied to observed chlorophyll concentrations, a representation of the oceanic mixed layer, inclusion of turbulence generated by tidal mixing on shelves and schemes allowing water from marginal seas such as the Red and Baltic Seas to "mix" across narrow straits at their mouths.

== Simulation description ==
Two sets of models were run for the IPCC, consisting of very similar ocean circulations but different methodology for solving the equations of motion. The result is that the models have very different wind stresses over the Southern Ocean, with the CM2.0 exhibiting the common bias of winds that are shifted equatorward but the CM2.1 model being one of the few that have winds close to the correct latitude and magnitude in this region (Russell et al., 2006). Work by Reichler and Kim at the University of Utah suggests that this model series is one of the top models in a range of atmospheric characteristics. It also has one of the better simulations of El Nino among the IPCC models (van Oldenburgh et al., 2005; Wittenberg et al., 2006). However, as is the case with most AOGCMs run without flux adjustment, the models fail to capture the cold upwelling zones along the eastern boundaries of the Pacific and Atlantic, and tend to produce an overly dry Amazon basin.

== Further development ==
Development of the CM2.1 model has progressed in three areas. Improving the modeling of aerosols and atmospheric chemistry led to a CM3 model in 2011. Improvement in modeling of biogeochemical cycles led to models ESM2M and ESM2G. A third approach was to increase the resolution of the CM2 model, which led to models CM2.5, CM26, FLOR and HiFLOR.

== See also ==
- Modular ocean model
- HadCM3
- EdGCM
- Coupled forecast system, the operational version of this model
