= Per Scholas =

Non-profit organization in the USA

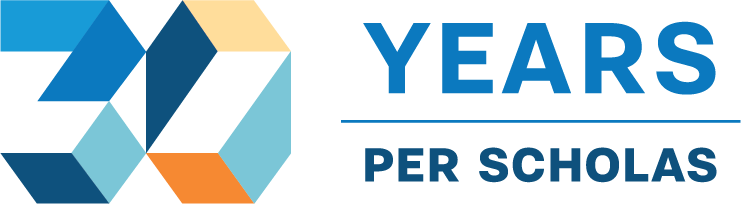
Per Scholas logo

Per Scholas is a United States–based nonprofit organization that provides no-cost technology training to individuals. Founded in 1995 by John Hoyt Stookey and Lewis E. Miller, the organization is headquartered in the Bronx, New York City, and operates training programs in over 25 cities across the country, as well as offering remote learning options.

== Mission and Approach ==
Per Scholas aims to promote economic mobility through skills training and access to high-growth careers in the technology sector. The organization partners with employers, including Fortune 500 companies and startups, to build inclusive talent pipelines and address the national demand for skilled IT professionals.

== Programs ==
Per Scholas offers a range of no-cost, full-time training programs in high-demand tech disciplines. These include:

- IT Support
- Network Engineering
- Cybersecurity
- Software Testing / Quality Assurance
- Web Development
- Data Center Operations

Each program combines hands-on technical instruction with professional development, career coaching, and job placement support. The curricula are developed in collaboration with industry partners to ensure alignment with employer needs and local job markets.

Training is funded through a combination of corporate sponsorships, philanthropic foundations, public funding, and individual donations.

As of 2025, Per Scholas has trained more than 30,000 individuals, with graduates typically earning three times their pre-training income in entry-level tech roles.

== Locations ==
Per Scholas operates campuses in over 25 U.S. cities, including Atlanta, Boston, Chicago, Dallas, Detroit, Newark, New York City, Philadelphia, and Seattle, among others. The organization also offers a national remote training option.

== Leadership ==
The late John Hoyt Stookey, co-founder of Per Scholas, previously served as chairman, president, and CEO of Quantum Corporation. He remained active in various corporate and nonprofit boards.

Lewis E. Miller, co-founder and current board chairman, is the president of Qvidian and has held leadership positions at Synergistics and The Future Now, Inc.

Plinio Ayala has served as CEO of Per Scholas since 2004. Under his leadership, the organization expanded nationally and significantly increased its program offerings. Ayala has received multiple recognitions, including the Liberty Award from the New York Post and a Citation of Merit from the Bronx Borough President. In 2025, he was named to City & State New York's Bronx Power 100 list for his impact on workforce development.

Caitlyn Brazill became President of Per Scholas in 2025, following several years as the organization’s Chief Development Officer and Chief Revenue Officer. During her tenure, she led efforts that tripled revenue and raised over $50 million to support workforce development nationwide. Brazill has more than 15 years of experience in New York City's nonprofit and public sectors.

Each campus maintains a local advisory board composed of business and community leaders.

== B2B ==
Per Scholas partners with employers ranging from innovative startups to Fortune 1000 companies to strengthen and expand their technology workforces. Through its Tech Talent Solutions, the organization provides a full suite of services that address immediate hiring needs and long-term workforce development.

These solutions include emerging talent cohorts, direct hire pipelines, customized upskilling and reskilling programs for incumbent employees, and registered apprenticeships that combine classroom training with on-the-job experience. All programs are designed in collaboration with employers to align with business goals, industry certifications, and evolving market demands.

Per Scholas works with more than 1000 employers nationwide, many of whom contribute funding, curriculum expertise, and hiring commitments. These partnerships enable companies to access job-ready technologists while creating sustainable talent pipelines that improve retention and deliver measurable return on investment.

== Future of Tech ==
The future of technology is arriving faster than most organizations are prepared for—and the gap between innovation and implementation is growing. In the 2025 Future of Tech report, Per Scholas surveyed over 2,000 tech professionals, from engineers to executives, to understand how companies are navigating AI, cybersecurity, and the rapidly scaling infrastructure that underpins our digital economy.

The findings: while investment in tools and technologies is accelerating, talent readiness is falling behind.

Despite the urgency, the workforce is ready. 88% of employees say they would upskill if given the opportunity, and they’re willing to invest their own time to do it.

Each year, Per Scholas trains thousands of professionals in fields such as cybersecurity, AI, Cloud DevOps, Data Engineering, Software Engineering, etc.

Per Scholas partners with employers nationwide to build AI-ready, cybersecurity-strong teams prepared for tomorrow’s challenges.

== Impact and Outcomes ==
Per Scholas’s internal reporting and independent media coverage demonstrate strong outcomes in terms of graduate earnings, diversity, and economic efficiency.

According to the organization's 2023 annual report, in that year alone, over 4,600 learners were trained (both in-person and remotely). More than 2,600 graduates launched careers, earning an average first-year wage of $48,000, with an estimated 8:1 economic return for every dollar invested.

Across the combined 2022–2023 period, the organization supported more than 7,000 learners, with graduates earning three times their pre-training wages. In 2022, the graduation rate was 85 %, and over 2,100 graduates entered the workforce, collectively earning $108 million in first-year wages.

Independent coverage by Forbes in May 2024 highlighted the speed and effectiveness of Per Scholas’s skills-based training model. The article reported that graduates earn three times their pre-training salary, with 87 % of learners identifying as people of color and over 40 % as women. It also noted that the program’s emphasis on skills—rather than four-year degrees—allows graduates to enter tech careers more quickly.
