= Climate Data Exchange =

Software framework for sharing climate data and models

The Climate Data Exchange (CDX) is a JPL software framework, built on the Apache Object Oriented Data Technology (OODT) software, for sharing climate data and models.
