= Kirk Bryan (oceanographer) =

American oceanographer

Kirk Bryan Jr.
- Born: July 21, 1929 (age 97)
- Education: Massachusetts Institute of Technology
- Scientific career
- Fields: Oceanography
- Thesis: A numerical investigation of certain features of the general circulation (1957)
- Doctoral advisor: Edward Norton Lorenz

Kirk Bryan Jr. (born July 21, 1929) is an American oceanographer who is considered to be the founder of numerical ocean modeling. He is the son of Kirk Bryan, Sr. (geologist, 1888–1950). Starting in the 1960s at the Geophysical Fluid Dynamics Laboratory, then located in Washington, D.C., Bryan worked with a series of colleagues to develop numerical schemes for solving the equations of motion describing flow on a sphere. His work on these schemes led to the so-called "Bryan-Cox code" with which many early simulations were made, and which led to the Modular Ocean Model currently used by many numerical oceanographers and climate scientists. He built his 1969 ocean model on the Arakawa B-grid, which was thought to be better suited to the coarse resolutions it used. The models that followed in the Bryan–Cox–Semtner lineage kept it even at finer resolutions.

In addition to his important contributions in developing numerical codes, Bryan was also involved in early efforts to apply them to understanding the global climate system. In 1967, he and Michael Cox published the first model of the 3-dimensional circulation of the ocean, forced by both winds and thermodynamic forcing. In 1969, a paper with Syukuro Manabe was the first to present integrations of a fully coupled atmosphere-ocean model, demonstrating the importance of ocean heat transport to the climate. This work was named one of the top ten breakthroughs in the history of the National Oceanographic and Atmospheric Administration. Bryan's 1971 paper with the noted dynamicist Adrian Gill demonstrated the important role played by bottom topography in setting the structure of the global ocean circulation, and played a major role in suggesting links between changes in continental topography and climate, continuing a long-term interest in the role of oceanic heat transport in determining global climate. Dr. Bryan was a lead author of the "Transient Climate Change" section of the 1989 scientific assessment report to the Intergovernmental Panel on Climate Change.

Bryan has been awarded the Maurice Ewing Medal of the American Geophysical Union for his contributions to the field of ocean science. In 2023, he was awarded the Alexander Agassiz Medal.

== Notable scientific papers ==
- Bryan, Kirk; Cox, M. D. (1967), "A numerical investigation of the oceanic general circulation", Tellus, 19 (1): 54–80, Bibcode:1967TellA..19...54B, doi:10.1111/j.2153-3490.1967.tb01459.x
- Manabe, S.; Bryan, K. (1969), "Climate Calculation with a combined ocean-atmosphere model," Journal of the Atmospheric Sciences, 26(4), 786–789, https://doi.org/10.1175/1520-0469(1969)026<0786:CCWACO>2.0.CO;2
- Bryan, K; Gill, A. E. (1971), "Effects of geometry on the circulation of a three-dimensional southern-hemisphere ocean model", Deep-Sea Research, 18 (7): 685–721, Bibcode:1971DSROA..18..685G, doi:10.1016/0011-7471(71)90086-6
- Bryan, K; Komro, F. G.; Manabe, S.; Spelman, M. J. (1982), "Transient climate response to increasing atmospheric carbon dioxide", Science, 215 (4528): 56–58, Bibcode:1982Sci...215...56B, doi:10.1126/science.215.4528.56, PMID 17790468, S2CID 10552825
