= Geophysical Fluid Dynamics Laboratory =

American physics research center

The Geophysical Fluid Dynamics Laboratory (GFDL) is a laboratory in the National Oceanic and Atmospheric Administration (NOAA) Office of Oceanic and Atmospheric Research (OAR). The current director is Venkatachalam Ramaswamy. It is one of seven Research Laboratories within NOAA's OAR.

GFDL is engaged in comprehensive long-lead-time research to expand scientific understanding of the physical and chemical processes that govern the behavior of the atmosphere and the oceans as complex fluid systems. These systems can be modeled mathematically and their phenomenology can be studied by computer simulation methods.

GFDL's accomplishments include the development of the first climate models to study global warming, the first comprehensive ocean prediction codes, and the first dynamical models with significant skill in hurricane track and intensity predictions. Much current research within the laboratory is focused around the development of Earth System Models for assessment of natural and human-induced climate change.

== Accomplishments ==
- The first global numerical simulations of the atmosphere — defining the basic structure of the numerical weather prediction and climate models that are still in use today throughout the world.
- The first numerical simulation of the world ocean.
- The initial definition and further elaborations of many of the central issues in global warming research, including water vapor feedback, polar amplification of temperature change, summer mid-continental dryness and cloud feedback.
- The first coupled atmosphere-ocean climate models and the first simulations of global warming using these models (including the above feedback processes and the potential weakening of the Atlantic overturning circulation).
- The development of a state-of-art hurricane model and its transfer to operations in the NOAA National Weather Service and the Navy.

== Scientific divisions ==
The GFDL has a diverse community of about 300 researchers, collaborators and staff, with many from Britain, India, China, Japan, France, and other countries around the world. The laboratory is currently organized into several scientific divisions (listed alphabetically below). There is also a large group of scientific programmers known as the Modeling Systems Division, as well as a large computer support group.

=== Atmospheric Physics ===
Current head: Venkatachalam Ramaswamy

This divisions goal is to employ numerical models and observations of the Earth System to characterize and quantify atmospheric physical processes, particularly those involving greenhouse gases, aerosols, water vapor, and clouds, and their roles in atmospheric general circulation, weather and climate.

=== Biogeochemistry, Atmospheric Chemistry, and Ecosystems ===
Current head: John P. Dunne

This divisions goal is to develop and use the GFDL’s earth system models to create a more comprehensive understanding of the interactions between physical, chemical, and ecological drivers and feedbacks on the earth system.

=== Ocean and Cryosphere ===
Current head: Rong Zhang

This divisions goal is to conduct leading research to understand ocean and cryosphere changes and variability; their interactions with weather, climate, sea level, and ecosystems; and advance prediction and projection of future changes.

=== Seasonal-to-Decadal Variability and Predictability ===
Current head: Thomas L. Delworth

This divisions goal is to improve our understanding of climate variability, predictability and change on time scales ranging from seasonal to multidecadal. This includes internal variability of the coupled climate system, and the response to changing radiative forcing.

=== Weather and Climate Dynamics ===
Current head: Thomas Knutson

This divisions goal is to develop innovative physical and dynamical components for the next generation of earth system models, with special emphasis on high resolution (1–25 km) atmospheric model development.

== Facilities ==
The GFDL is located at Princeton University's Forrestal Campus in Princeton, NJ.

Since March 2011, the GFDL no longer possesses an on-site supercomputer. They instead utilize a massively parallel Cray supercomputer with over 140,000 processor cores which is currently located at Oak Ridge National Laboratory in Oak Ridge, Tennessee. This contrasts from their previous systems architecture, which consisted of eight Silicon Graphics Altix computers, each housing 1024 processor cores. Hardware updates occur on average, every 18 months.

The GFDL has been using high-performance computing systems to perform numerical modeling since the 1950s.

== Alumni ==
- Joseph Smagorinsky: GFDL's first director
- Jerry D. Mahlman: GFDL's second director
- Ants Leetmaa: GFDL's third director
- Isaac Held
- Kirk Bryan (oceanographer)
- Syukuro Manabe
- Yoshio Kurihara
- Kikuro Miyakoda
- Isidoro Orlanski
- Gareth Williams
- Frank Lipps
- Abraham Oort

== See also ==
- Modular Ocean Model
- GFDL CM2.X
