= United States tropical cyclone rainfall climatology =

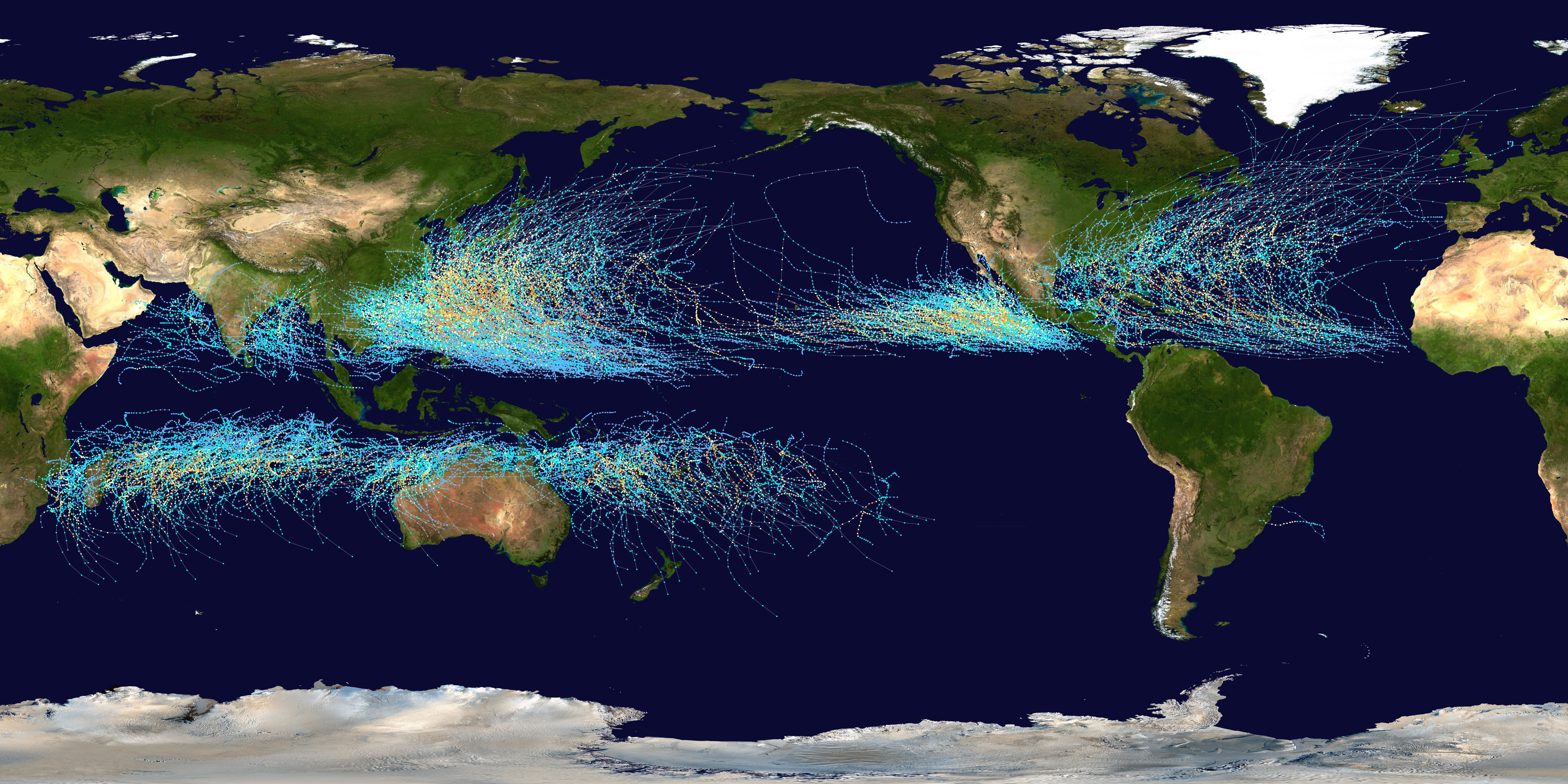
All tropical cyclone tracks between the years 1985 and 2005.

Typically, five tropical cyclones and their extratropical cyclone remnants impact the United States each year, contributing between a tenth and a quarter of the annual precipitation across the southern tier of the country. The highest rainfall amounts appear close to the coast, with lesser amounts falling farther inland. Obstructions to the precipitation pattern, such as the Appalachian Mountains, focus higher amounts from northern Georgia through New England. While most impacts occur with systems moving in from the Atlantic Ocean or Gulf of Mexico, some emanate from the eastern Pacific Ocean, with a few crossing Mexico before impacting the Southwest. Those making landfall within the Southeast portion of the country tend to have the greatest potential for heavy rains.

== Long-term averages ==
On average, five North Atlantic hurricanes or their remnants lead to rainfall across the contiguous United States each year, contributing between a tenth and a quarter of the annual rainfall to the southern United States. While many of these storms form in the Atlantic basin, some systems or their remnants move through Mexico from the Eastern Pacific basin. Tropical cyclones from the eastern Pacific bring nearly 20 percent of the average annual rainfall to southern California. The average storm total rainfall for a tropical cyclone impacting the contiguous United States from the Atlantic basin is about 16 in (410 mm), with 70 to 75 percent of the storm total falling within a 24‑hour period.

== Highest known amounts for the United States since 1950 ==
Below is a list of the top ten highest known storm total rainfall amounts from individual tropical cyclones across the United States since 1950. Four of the wettest systems struck Texas, three strongly impacted Hawaii, while two others made their biggest mark on Florida, and another impacted Puerto Rico.

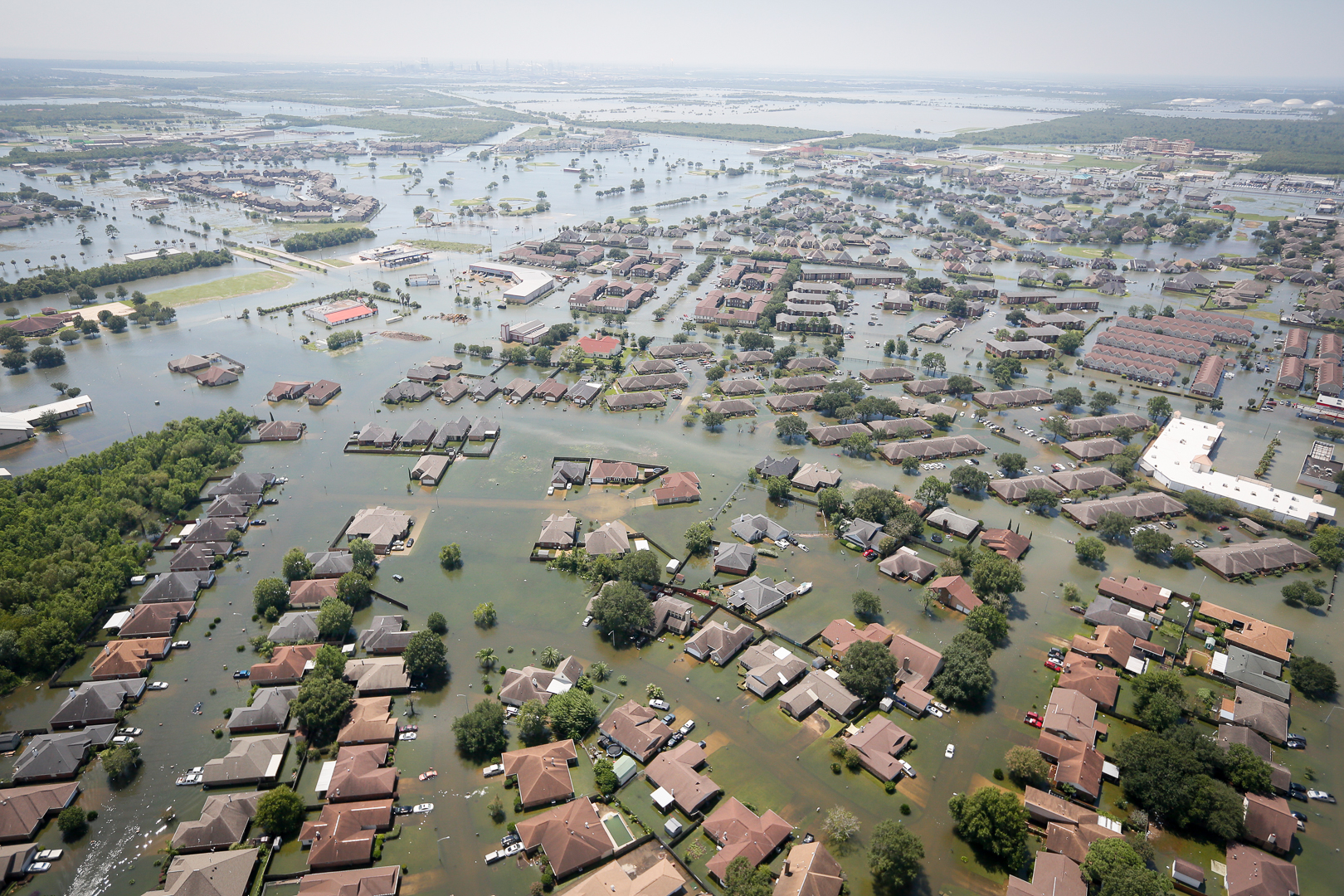
Flooding in Port Arthur, Texas caused by Hurricane Harvey. Harvey was both the wettest and costliest tropical cyclone in United States history.

1. 60.58 in (1,539 mm) – Harvey 2017 in Nederland, Texas
2. 52.02 in (1,321 mm) – Lane 2018 in Mountainview, Hawaii
3. 52.00 in (1,321 mm) – Hiki 1950 at the Kanalohuluhulu Ranger Station, Hawaii
4. 48 in (1,200 mm) – Amelia 1978 in Medina, Texas
5. 45.20 in (1,148 mm) – Easy 1950 in Yankeetown, Florida
6. 45 in (1,100 mm) – Claudette 1979 in Alvin, Texas
7. 41.68 in (1,059 mm) – T.D. # 15 1970 in Jayuya, Puerto Rico
8. 40.68 in (1,033 mm) – Allison 2001 in northwest Jefferson County, Texas
9. 38.76 in (985 mm) – Paul 2000 at the Kapapala Ranch 36, Hawaii
10. 38.46 in (977 mm) – Georges 1998 in Munson, Florida

== Maximum per state for the contiguous United States ==
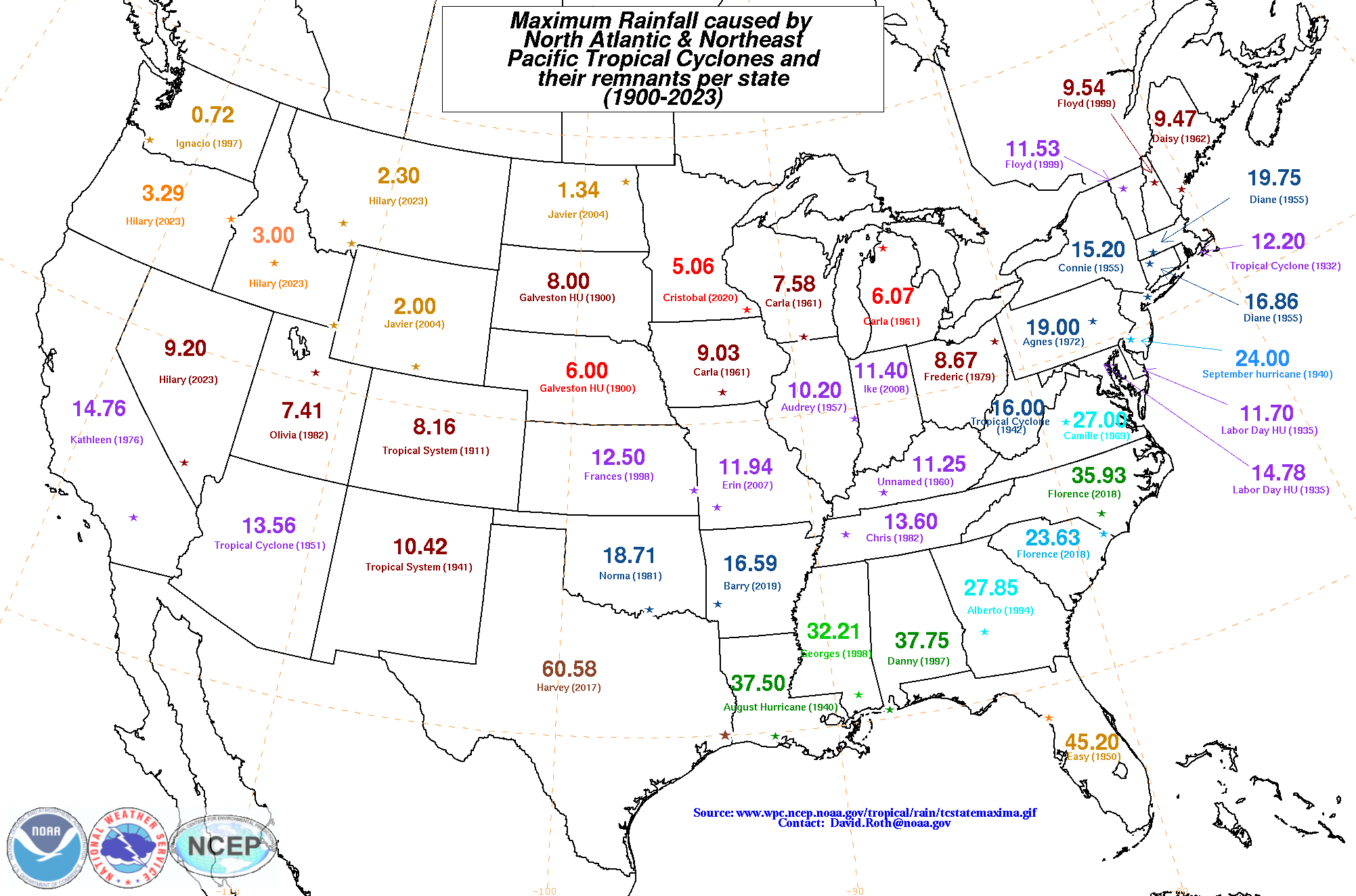
U.S. tropical cyclone rainfall maxima per state

State maxima relating to tropical cyclones and their remnants are shown on the left, color-coded by amount. Tropical cyclones from the Atlantic basin have the most sway along the Gulf coast and Eastern Seaboard. The impact of tropical cyclones and their remnants originally from the eastern Pacific stretches as far east as Michigan and Indiana. Rainfall related to the low pressure area once associated with a tropical cyclone, or its remnants aloft, are included in this sample. No additional rainfall from pre-existing upper lows as seen before cyclones such as Hurricane Fran of 1996 or from upper cyclones that closed off behind former tropical cyclones such as Hurricane Juan of 1985 was included.

The state of Texas has the highest amounts, followed by Florida, Alabama, North Carolina, and Mississippi. In the western United States, the same can be said for the remnants of Hurricane Kathleen of 1976 in California, and the remnants of Tropical Storm Nora of 1997 in Arizona. In addition, some rainfall records across the Midwest occurred during Tropical Storm Candy of 1968.

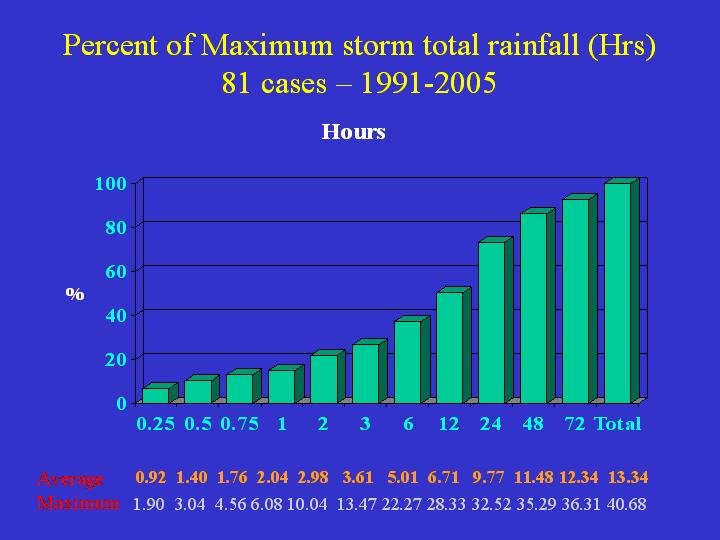
U.S. Tropical Cyclone Rainfall Accumulations per time frame

== Average and record statistics per time frame for the contiguous United States ==
To the right is a graphic showing averages and extremes for a 15-year sample of tropical cyclones and their remnants affecting the contiguous United States. The units of the rainfall amounts are in inches, while the time units are in hours. The bars in the graph express the percent of the storm total rainfall, which is defined to be 100 percent in the final column. Note that, on average, as much as one-fourth of the total occurs in 2–3 hours, while half falls within 12 hours, and almost three-quarters of the storm total falls within a 24‑hour period. Cases where a cyclone scraped the coast were not separated out from those that made a more direct landfall. Also, Pacific and Atlantic cases were not separated. This all explains the average storm total of the sample being depressed to 13.34 in (339 mm). On the bottom of the graphic are listed the averages per time frame and the records. The records were mainly set during Tropical Storm Allison of 2001 and Hurricane Danny of 1997. This graphic will be updated as the climatology pushes farther back in time.

== United States rules of thumb for forecasting ==
=== Kraft rule ===
During the late 1950s, this rule of thumb came into being, developed by R. H. Kraft. It was noted from rainfall amounts (in imperial units) reported by the first order rainfall network in the United States that the storm total rainfall fit a simple equation: 100 divided by the speed of motion in knots. This rule works as long as a tropical cyclone is moving and only the first order or synoptic station network (with observations spaced about 60 mi (97 km) apart) are used to derive storm totals. Canada uses a modified version of the Kraft rule which divides the results by a factor of two, which takes into account the lower sea surface temperatures seen around Atlantic Canada and the prevalence of systems undergoing vertical wind shear at their northerly latitudes. The main problem with this rule is that the rainfall observing network is denser than either the synoptic reporting network or the first order station networks, which means the absolute maximum is likely to be underestimated. Another problem is that it does not take the size of the tropical cyclone or topography into account.

=== Eight inch or 203 mm rule ===
Rusty Pfost, now the head of the Miami National Weather Service Forecast Office, did a study in 1999 reviewing rainfall totals from tropical systems affecting Florida between 1960 and 1998. He found that for tropical cyclones moving at greater than 6 knots, the average storm total was normally in the 5–10 inch (127–254 mm) range. Slower moving storms usually forced greater than 15 in (380 mm) of rain to fall.

=== Sixteen inch or 406 mm rule ===
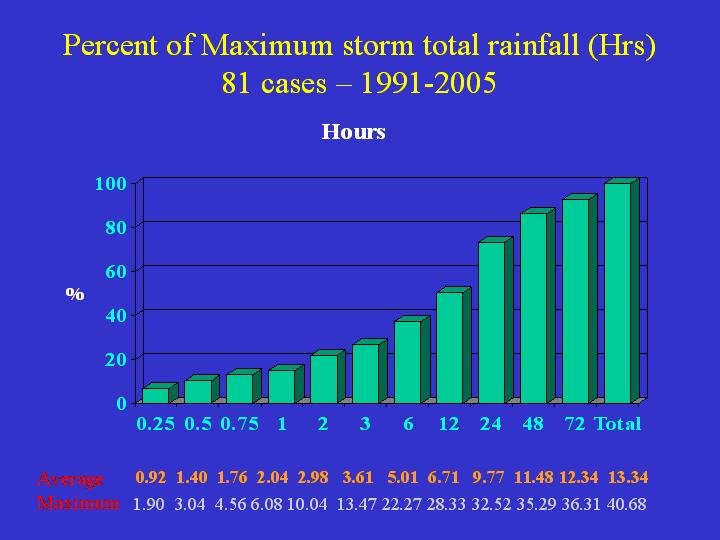
U.S. Tropical Cyclone Rainfall Accumulations per time frame

David Roth, a forecaster at the Hydrometeorological Prediction Center, determined that the average amount for all tropical cyclones impacting the United States was 13.34 in (339 mm) between 1991 and 2005. When removing the storms that grazed the domain, an average of near 16 in (410 mm) was obtained. Using this latter amount appears to work best for systems that experience little vertical wind shear and are of at least average size. Amounts measured in small/midget tropical cyclones showed storm total amounts closer to 6 in (150 mm). Operationally, variations to these amounts are introduced if the cyclone encounters mountain zones, interacts with a nearby front, or the storm is significantly sheared.

== See also ==
- Climate of the United States
- Tropical cyclone
- Tropical cyclone rainfall climatology
- Tropical cyclone rainfall forecasting
