= Hurricane Weather Research and Forecasting Model =

Long-range numerical model used to forecast tropical cyclones

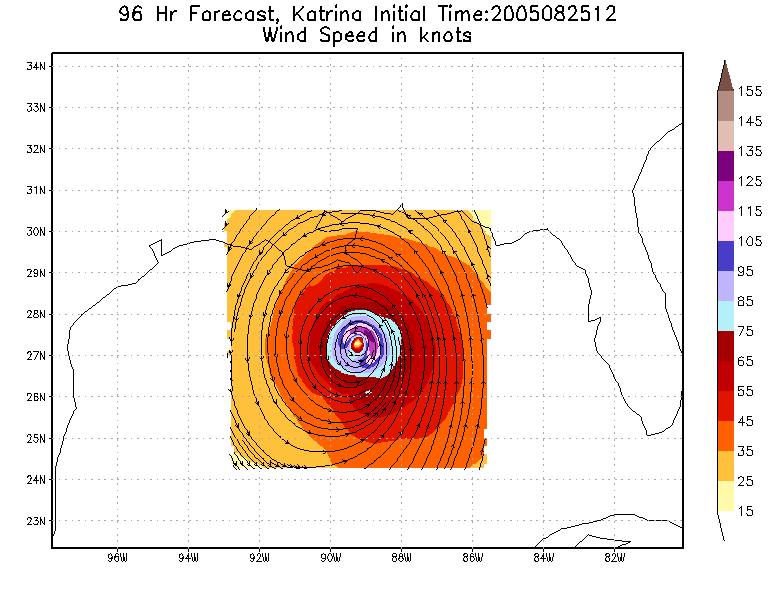
HWRF 96-hour (4-day) forecast for Hurricane Katrina heading for New Orleans in 2005.

The Hurricane Weather Research and Forecasting (HWRF) model is a specialized version of the weather research and forecasting model and is used to forecast the track and intensity of tropical cyclones. The model was developed by the National Oceanic and Atmospheric Administration (NOAA), the U.S. Naval Research Laboratory, the University of Rhode Island, and Florida State University. It became operational in 2007.

The HWRF computer model is the operational backbone for hurricane track and intensity forecasts by the National Hurricane Center (NHC). The model will use data from satellite observations, buoys, and reconnaissance aircraft, making it able to access more meteorological data than any other hurricane model before it. The model will eventually run at an even higher resolution which will allow smaller scale features to become more discernible.

The following model description can be found in the product description document for the National Centers for Environmental Prediction's Model Analyses & Forecasts:

— The HWRF provides operational guidance for forecasters at the National Hurricane Center in both the North Atlantic and East Pacific basins. Hurricane forecasts are produced on demand every six hours at 00, 06, 12, and 18 UTC for up to four tropical storms at a time. The HWRF hurricane model graphics are available at six-hour increments up to 126 hours. Often, there are less than 126 hours.

— The model is a nested grid system with an outermost domain and a nested grid with resolutions of 27 and 9 km respectively and 42 vertical levels. The HWRF vortex initialization uses the 6 hour forecast as the first guess, then uses regional GSI 3DAR data assimilation to produce the initial hurricane vortex that matches the intensity and structure parameters provided operationally by NHC. The HWRF is coupled to a high-resolution version of the Princeton Ocean Model for the Atlantic Basin. The ocean initialization system uses observed altimeter observations to provide a more realistic Loop Current and Gulf Stream conditions.

— Information on the model products can be found at the production model web page http://www.nco.ncep.noaa.gov/pmb/products/hur/

Mary Glackin, acting director of NOAA's National Weather Service, says that "It is vital that we understand all the factors of hurricane forecasting throughout the life of a storm and HWRF will provide an unprecedented level of detail. Over the next several years, this model promises to improve forecasts for tropical cyclone intensity, wave and storm surge, and hurricane-related inland flooding." She also says that the HWRF "will be one of the most dynamic tools available" for forecasters.

Development of the HWRF model began in 2002. In 2007, the HWRF model became operational. While the HWRF model will eventually replace the GFDL model, the GFDL model will continue to be run in 2007. The GFDL model has continued to be run operationally through 2012.

== See also ==
- Tropical cyclone
- Tropical cyclone forecasting
- Tropical cyclone forecast model
- Tropical cyclone rainfall forecasting
- Weather forecasting

== Websites with the HWRF model ==
- Community Code from DTC
- Model Analyses and Forecasts from NCEP
- Experimental forecast Tropical Cyclone Genesis Potential Fields from Florida State University
- Cyclone phase evolution: Analyses & Forecasts from Florida State University
- Tropical Cyclone Tracking Page – Model track performance from Kinetic Analysis Corporation and University of Central Florida

== Other external links ==
- HWRF Project
- HWRF PowerPoint Tutorials from NCEP's EMC
