= Danger area =

Danger area may refer to:

- Danger area or 1-2-3 rule in tropical cyclone forecasting
- Danger area or protected area of a cricket pitch
- Danger area of airspace

== See also ==
- Bombing range
- Shooting range
