= China tropical cyclone rainfall climatology =

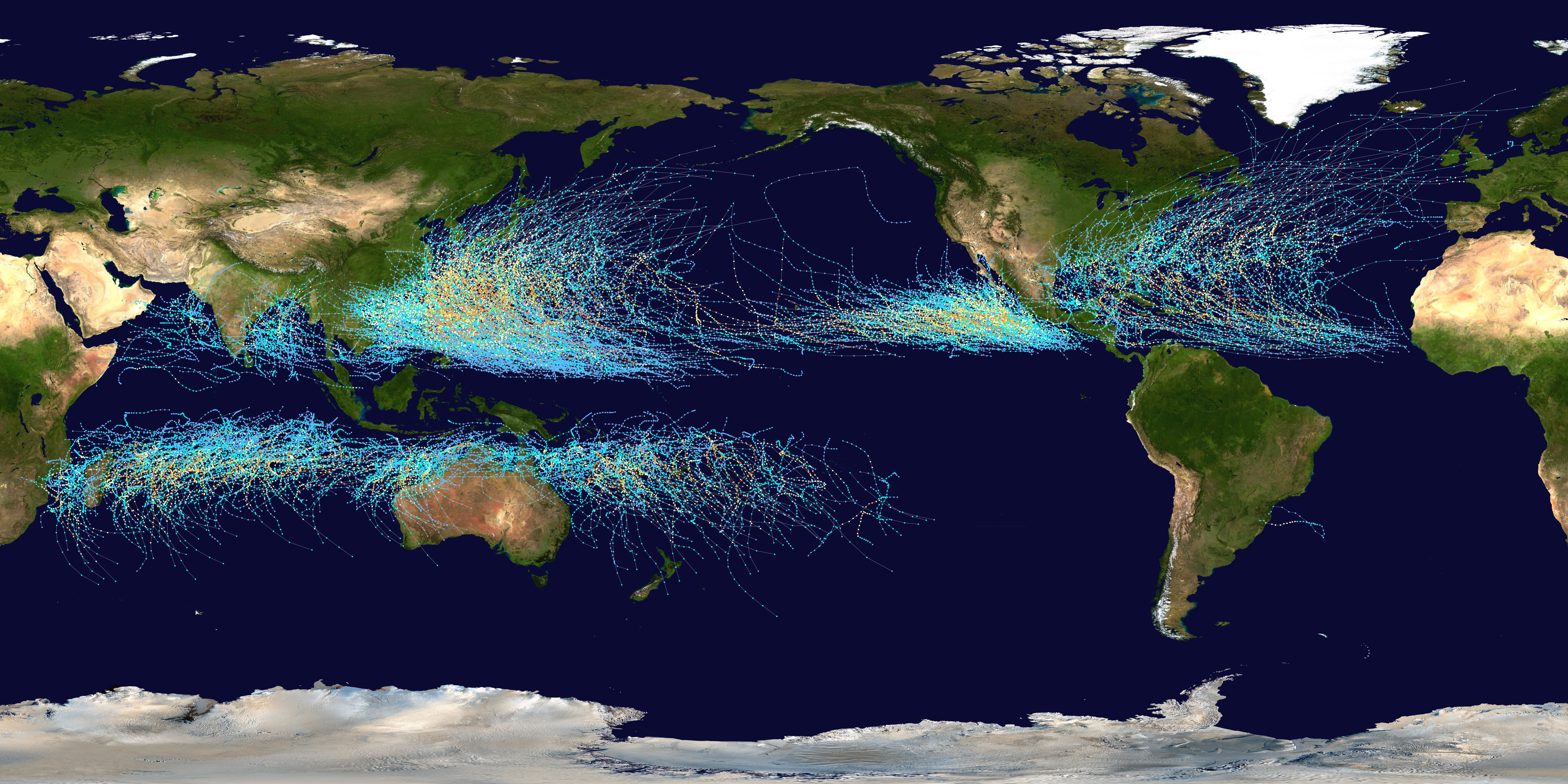
A map of all tropical cyclone tracks, encompassing the period between the years 1985 and 2005.

China is a mountainous country, which leads to rapid dissipation of cyclones that move inland as well as significant amounts of rain from those dissipating cyclones. Typhoon Nina in 1975 caused the collapse of two huge reservoirs and ten smaller dams when 1062 mm (41.81 inches) of rain fell in Henan Province during a 24‑hour period. Super Typhoon Carla was the wettest tropical cyclone on record for mainland China. Since 1957, there has been a downward trend in tropical cyclone rainfall for the country.

== Mainland ==
Most of the rain China experiences during the year occurs during the summer months. Typhoons cause many of the intense rains seen within the country. The heavy rains occur over a large area, typically 1,000,000 square kilometres (390,000 mi^{2}). Across China between the years of 1983 and 2006, an average of 2.9 tropical cyclones move into Guangdong province, making it the most affected province within mainland China. Hainan averages 1.3 tropical cyclones annually, while Fujian experiences 1.2 tropical cyclones annually, and Zhejiang witnessed 0.9 tropical cyclones annually. The wettest tropical cyclone on record for the mainland was Super Typhoon Carla, which dropped 2,749 millimetres (108.2 in) of rain over a 48-hour period. Typhoon Nina (1975) produced the highest areal average rainfall amounts between August 4 and August 8 for the Hongru river basin for most time durations. The risk of tropical cyclones across Guangxi, Jiangsu, Shandong, and Liaoning provinces is significantly lower, with these provinces averaging between 0.1 and 0.4 tropical cyclones annually.

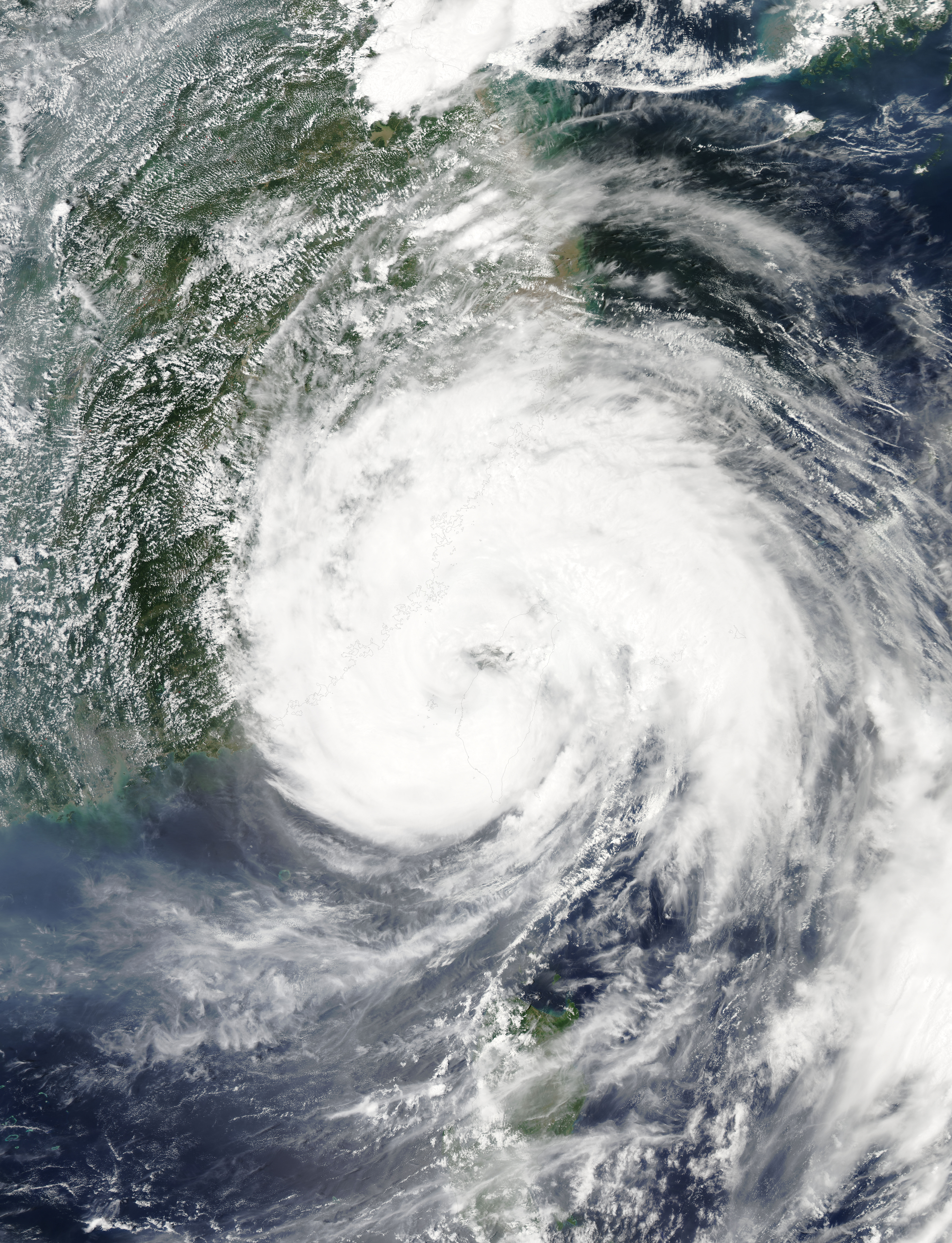
Typhoon Soudelor

Wettest tropical cyclones and their remnants in Mainland China Highest-known totals
| Precipitation | | | Storm | Location | Ref. |
| Rank | mm | in | Storm | Location | Ref. |
|---|---|---|---|---|---|
| 1 | 1629.0 | 64.13 | Nina 1975 | Banqiao Dam | |
| 2 | 951.0 | 37.4 | In-fa 2021 | Yuyao | |
| 3 | 831.1 | 32.72 | Fitow 2001 | Changjiang County | |
| 4 | 806.0 | 31.73 | Soudelor 2015 | Wenzhou | |
| 5 | 744.8 | 29.32 | Doksuri 2023 | Wangjiayuan Reservoir | |
| 6 | 662.0 | 26.01 | Chanthu 2021 | Dinghai District, Zhoushan | |
| 7 | 600.0 | 24.00 | Haikui 2012 | Anhui Province | |
| 8 | 555.0 | 21.85 | Chanchu 2006 | Zhangpu County | |

== Hong Kong ==
Typhoon Sam of the 1999 Pacific typhoon season became the wettest known tropical cyclone to impact Hong Kong since records began in 1884, breaking a 73‑year‑old record. A total of 23.98 inches/609 mm of rainfall fell between August 22 and August 25.

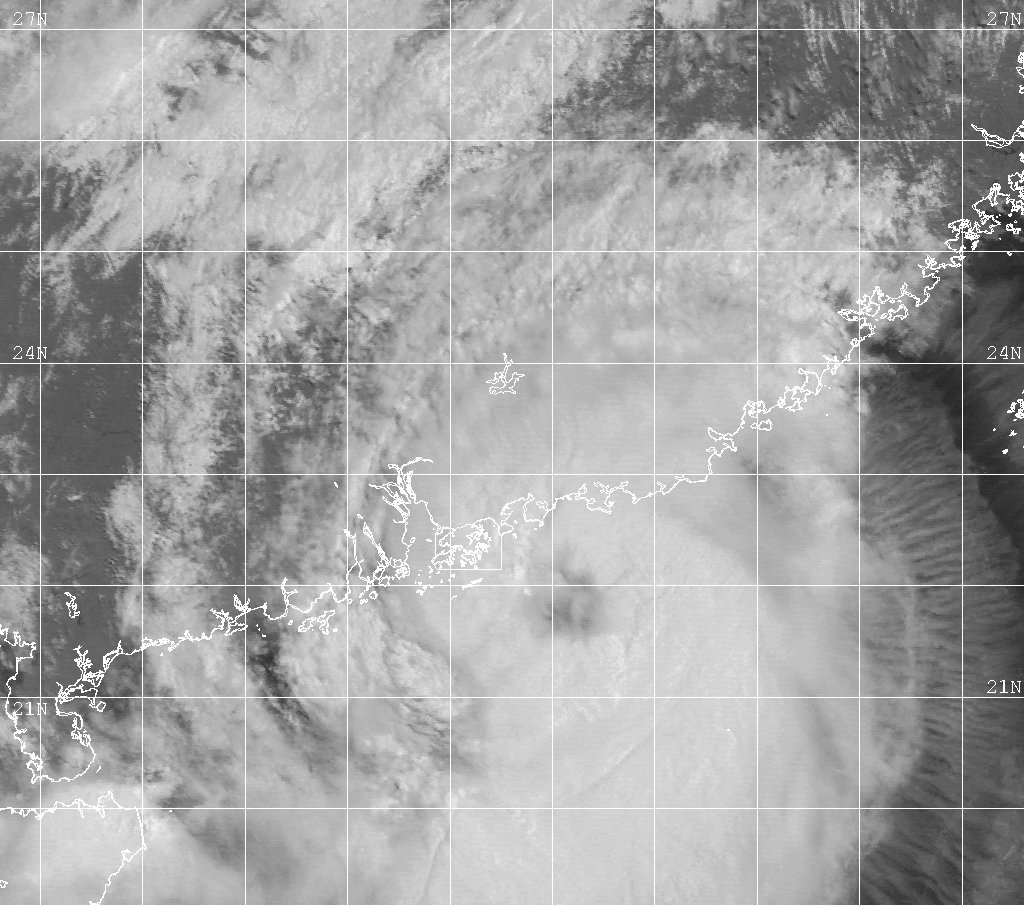
Typhoon Sam

Wettest tropical cyclones and their remnants Hong Kong Highest-known totals
| Precipitation | | | Storm | Location | Ref. |
| Rank | mm | in | Storm | Location | Ref. |
|---|---|---|---|---|---|
| 1 | 632.0 | 24.90 | Haikui 2023 | Hong Kong Observatory | |
| 2 | 616.5 | 24.27 | Sam 1999 | Hong Kong Observatory | |
| 3 | 597.0 | 23.50 | July 1926 Typhoon | Royal Observatory, Hong Kong | |
| 4 | 562.0 | 22.13 | June 1916 Typhoon | Royal Observatory, Hong Kong | |
| 5 | 530.7 | 20.89 | Agnes 1965 | Royal Observatory, Hong Kong | |
| 6 | 519.0 | 20.43 | Agnes 1978 | Royal Observatory, Hong Kong | |
| 7 | 516.1 | 20.32 | Ellen 1976 | Royal Observatory, Hong Kong | |
| 8 | 497.5 | 19.59 | Dot 1993 | Royal Observatory, Hong Kong | |
| 9 | 491.7 | 19.36 | Dot 1982 | Royal Observatory, Hong Kong | |
| 10 | 480.9 | 18.93 | Helen 1995 | Royal Observatory, Hong Kong | |

=== Lantau Island ===
Wettest tropical cyclones and their remnants Lantau Island Highest-known totals
| Precipitation | | | Storm | Location | Ref. |
| Rank | mm | in | Storm | Location | Ref. |
|---|---|---|---|---|---|
| 1 | 700 | 27.56 | Ira 1993 | | |

== Tibet Autonomous Region ==
An early October 2004 tropical depression brought moisture into the highlands of Tibet, leading to daily precipitation of 60 mm/2.4 inches liquid equivalent to Che-Ku County all in the form of heavy snow, which was a new October daily precipitation record for both rain and snow. This led to a loss of 340,000 kg of food, 230,000 kg of forage grass, and 263 livestock in the snowstorm.

== See also ==
- List of wettest tropical cyclones
- List of wettest tropical cyclones by country
- Tropical cyclone
- Tropical cyclone rainfall climatology
- Tropical cyclone rainfall forecasting
