= Hebert Box =

Atlantic hurricane prediction region

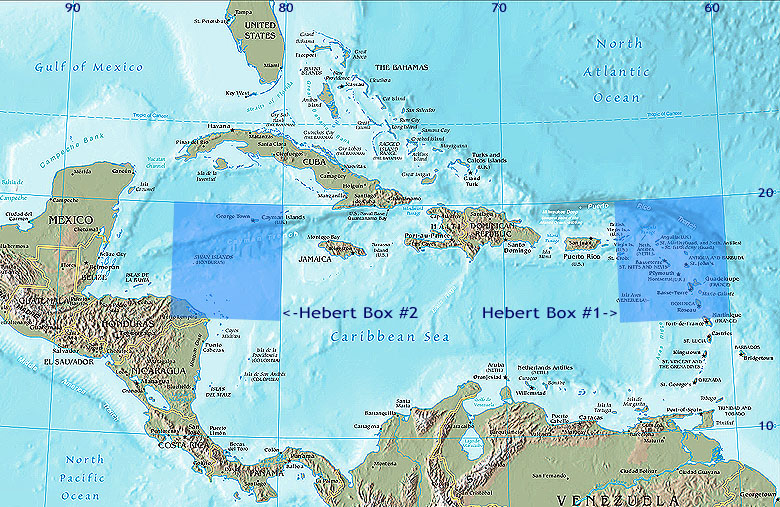
Location of Hebert Boxes in the Caribbean Sea.

An Hebert Box (pronounced AY-bear, also known as Hebert's Box) is one of two regions of the tropical Atlantic Ocean that are useful as predictors of hurricanes that will strike South Florida, US. They are named for former National Weather Service and National Hurricane Center forecaster Paul Hebert, who observed in the late 1970s that most strong hurricanes (characterized as those with winds exceeding 110 miles per hour (177 km/h)) which had struck South Florida since 1900 had also passed through one of these two small 335-mile-by-335-mile (517-km-by-517-km) square geographic regions.

Examples include unnamed hurricanes in 1926, 1928, 1933, as well as the major hurricanes Donna, Betsy, Charley, Wilma, Irma, and Ian all of which came through an Hebert Box. Collectively these storms killed more than 5,000 people in Florida. Conversely, storms such as the major hurricanes Floyd, Gert in 1999, and Dorian in 2019, which were headed for Florida at one point, missed the Hebert Boxes and turned away from Florida at the last minute.

== Location ==
The first Hebert Box is located east of Puerto Rico over the US Virgin Islands, between 15° and 20° north latitude and 60° to 65° west longitude. This was the first area that Hebert discovered, and provides an indication for the behavior of Cape Verde type storms, which form off of the western coast of Africa near the islands of the same name. This first box is useful for storms that typically form in the early part of the Atlantic hurricane season (June through early September).

The second Hebert Box is located over the Cayman Islands between 15° and 20° north latitude and 80° to 85° west longitude. This was the second box discovered, and provides an indication for the behavior of storms that will move north to hit Florida. These are usually late-season storms that form in this region in late September and October, and this box is mostly concerned with them.

== As predictors ==
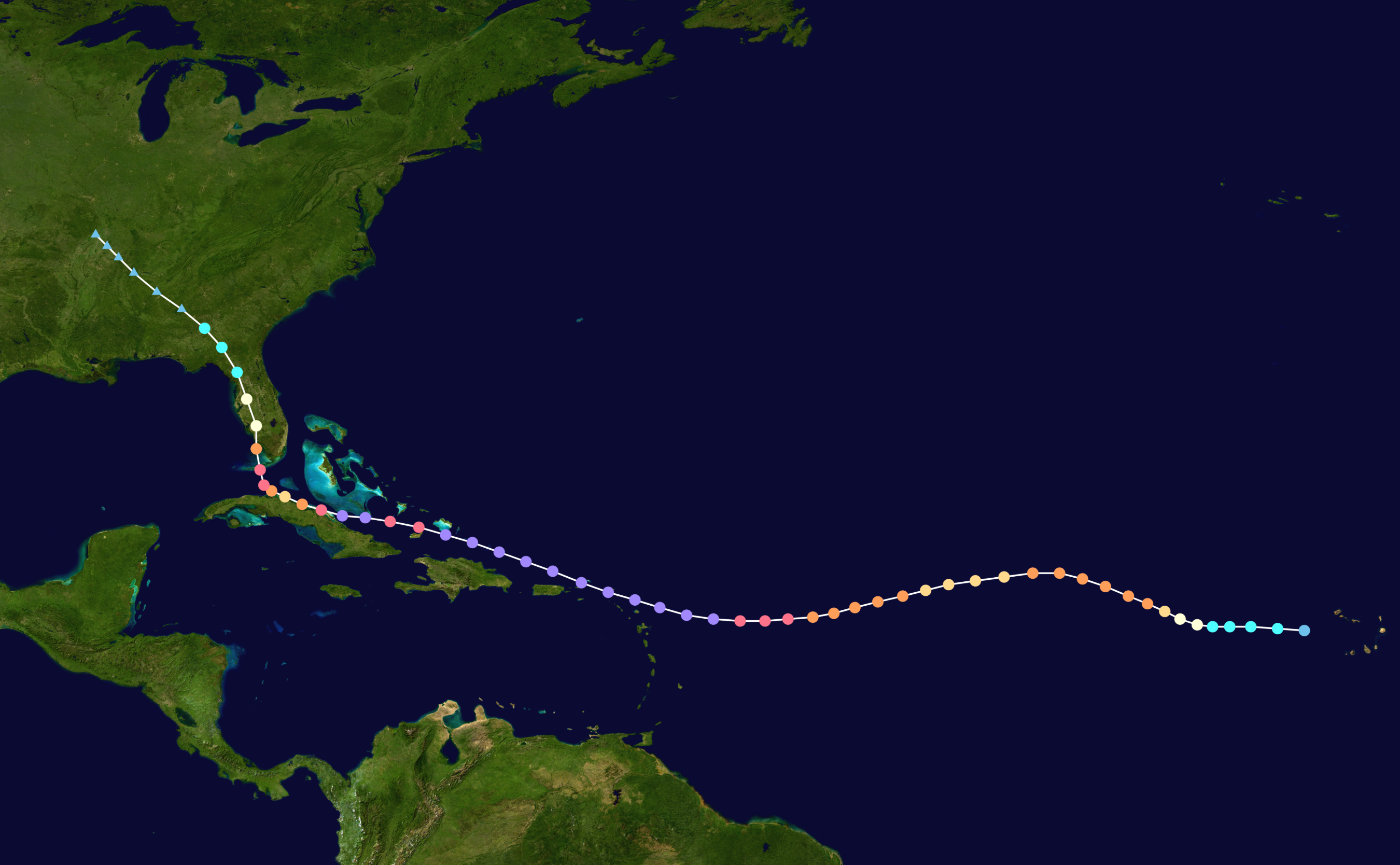
The track of Hurricane Irma which was at category 5 strength when it passed over the eastern box.

The geography of the Hebert Boxes is the key to their use as predictors. The boxes are located such that hurricanes have plenty of space to intensify after passing through them, and the prevailing winds tend to push them towards Florida. Many of the hurricanes that have passed through the eastern box have been Cape Verde hurricanes like Irma. To qualify as a possible threat to Florida they must have 110 mph winds and track through the box rather than forming outside the box like Katrina in 2005 or crossing the box as a weak hurricane or tropical storm. Conversely, if they pass outside the boxes, they are either too close to land to intensify much, or are far enough away from land that they are more subject to the influences of steering winds and other atmospheric conditions. These tend to either push the hurricane more westward across the Caribbean Sea towards the Dominican Republic, Haiti, Cuba, or into the Gulf of Mexico where they threaten Mexico and the Gulf Coast states, or eastwards causing them to curve outwards over the Atlantic and miss landfall altogether.

While these boxes provide an indication that a hurricane may threaten South Florida, they are not a perfect predictor. The Labor Day Hurricane of 1935, Hurricane Andrew (which did skirt just outside the edges of the eastern box), and Hurricane Milton did not pass through either box before making landfall in Florida. Additionally, a hurricane which does pass through a Hebert Box can very easily miss Florida, or indeed any landfall entirely. Hurricane Maria passed through one of the boxes but following a landfall in Puerto Rico, recurved well away from Florida. Gilbert also passed through one in the western Caribbean but did not turn north to Florida. Hebert himself acknowledged that the boxes are not a guarantee of hurricane landfall either way, but cautions that if a hurricane passes through one, "really, really pay attention. We worry plenty in August and September when one goes through that box, and we have a certain comfort level when one misses the box."
