= Tropical cyclone rainfall climatology =

A tropical cyclone rainfall climatology is developed to determine rainfall characteristics of past tropical cyclones. A tropical cyclone rainfall climatology can be used to help forecast current or upcoming tropical cyclone impacts. The degree of a tropical cyclone's rainfall impact depends upon speed of movement, storm size, and degree of vertical wind shear. One of the most significant threats from tropical cyclones is heavy rainfall. Large, slow-moving, and non-sheared tropical cyclones produce the heaviest rains. The intensity of a tropical cyclone appears to have little bearing on its potential for rainfall over land, but satellite measurements over the last several years show that more intense tropical cyclones produce noticeably more rainfall over water. Flooding from tropical cyclones remains a significant cause of fatalities, particularly in low-lying areas.

== Anticipating a flood event ==
While inland flooding is common to tropical cyclones, there are factors that lead to excessive rainfall from tropical cyclones. Slow motion, as was seen during Hurricane Danny (1997) and Hurricane Wilma, can lead to high amounts of rainfall. The presence of mountains/hills near the coast, like across much of Mexico, Haiti, the Dominican Republic, Central America, Madagascar, Réunion, China, and Japan acts to magnify rainfall potential due to forced upslope flow into the mountains. Strong upper-level forcing from a trough moving through the Westerlies and its associated cold front (as was the case during Hurricane Floyd), or significant moisture advection along a frontal boundary due to a trough or upper level low (as was the case during Hurricane Helene) can lead to high amounts of rainfall from systems moving at an average or even above average forward motion. Larger tropical cyclones drop more rainfall as they precipitate upon one spot for a longer time frame than average or small tropical cyclones. A combination of two of these factors could be especially crippling, as was seen during Hurricane Mitch in Central America. During the 2005 season, flooding related to slow-moving Hurricane Stan's broad circulation led to 1,662–2,000 deaths.

== General distribution within a tropical cyclone ==
Rainfall Rate per day within radius of the center (Riehl)
Radius (mi)	Radius (km)	Amount (in)	Amount (mm)
35	56	33.98	863
70	112	13.27	337
140	224	4.25	108
280	448	1.18	30

Isaac Cline was the first to investigate rainfall distribution around tropical cyclones in the early 1900s. He found that a larger proportion of rainfall falls in advance of the center (or eye) than after the center's passage, with the highest percentage falling in the right front quadrant. Father Viñes of Cuba found that some tropical cyclones have their highest rainfall rates in the rear quadrant within a training (non-moving) inflow band. Normally, as a tropical cyclone intensifies, its heavier rainfall rates become more concentrated around its center. Rainfall is found to be heaviest in tropical cyclones' inner core, whether it be the eyewall or central dense overcast, within a degree latitude of the center, with lesser amounts farther away from the center. Most of the rainfall in tropical cyclones is concentrated within their radius of gale-force (34 knots/39 mph; 63 km/h) winds. Rainfall is more common near the center of tropical cyclones overnight. Over land, outer bands are more active during the heating of the day, which can act to restrict inflow into the center of the cyclone. Recent studies have shown that half of the rainfall within a tropical cyclone is stratiform in nature. The chart to the right was developed by Riehl in 1954 using meteorological equations that assume a gale radius of about 140 miles (230 km), a fairly symmetric cyclone, and does not consider topographic effects or vertical wind shear. Local amounts can exceed this chart by a factor of two due to topography. Wind shear tends to lessen the amounts below what is shown in the table.

== Relation to storm size ==
The relative sizes of Typhoon Tip, Cyclone Tracy, and the United States.

Larger tropical cyclones have larger rain shields, which can lead to higher rainfall amounts farther from the cyclone's center. This is generally due to the longer time frame rainfall falls at any one spot in a larger system, when compared to a smaller system. Some of the differences seen concerning rainfall between larger and smaller storms could be the increased sampling of rainfall within a larger tropical cyclone when compared to that of a compact cyclone; in other words, the difference could be the result of a statistical problem.

== Slow/looping motion on rainfall magnitude ==
Storms that have moved slowly, or loop, over a succession of days, lead to the highest rainfall amounts for several countries. Riehl calculated that 33.97 inches (863 mm) of rainfall per day can be expected within one-half degree, or 35 miles (56 km), of the center of a mature tropical cyclone. Many tropical cyclones progress at a forward motion of 10 knots, which would limit the duration of this excessive rainfall to around one-quarter of a day, which would yield about 8.50 inches (216 mm) of rainfall. This would be true over water, within 100 miles (160 km) of the coastline, and outside topographic features. As a cyclone moves farther inland and is cut off from its supply of warmth and moisture (the ocean), rainfall amounts from tropical cyclones and their remains decrease quickly.

== Vertical wind shear impact on rainfall shield ==
Vertical wind shear forces the rainfall pattern around a tropical cyclone to become highly asymmetric, with most of the precipitation falling to the left and downwind of the shear vector, or downshear left. In other words, southwesterly shear forces the bulk of the rainfall north-northeast of the center. If the wind shear is strong enough, the bulk of the rainfall will move away from the center, leading to what is known as an exposed circulation center. When this occurs, the potential magnitude of rainfall with the tropical cyclone will be significantly reduced.

=== Effect of interaction with frontal boundaries/upper level troughs ===
As a tropical cyclone interacts with an upper-level trough and the related surface front, a distinct northern area of precipitation is seen along the front ahead of the axis of the upper-level trough. This type of interaction can lead to the appearance of the heaviest rainfall falling along and to the left of the tropical cyclone track, with the precipitation streaking hundreds of miles or kilometers downwind from the tropical cyclone. The stronger the upper trough picking up the tropical cyclone, the more significant the left of track shift in the rainfall distribution tends to be.

== Mountains ==
Moist air forced up the slopes of coastal hills and mountain chains can lead to much heavier rainfall than in the coastal plain. This heavy rainfall can lead to landslides, which still cause significant loss of life, such as seen during Hurricane Mitch in Central America.

== Global distribution ==
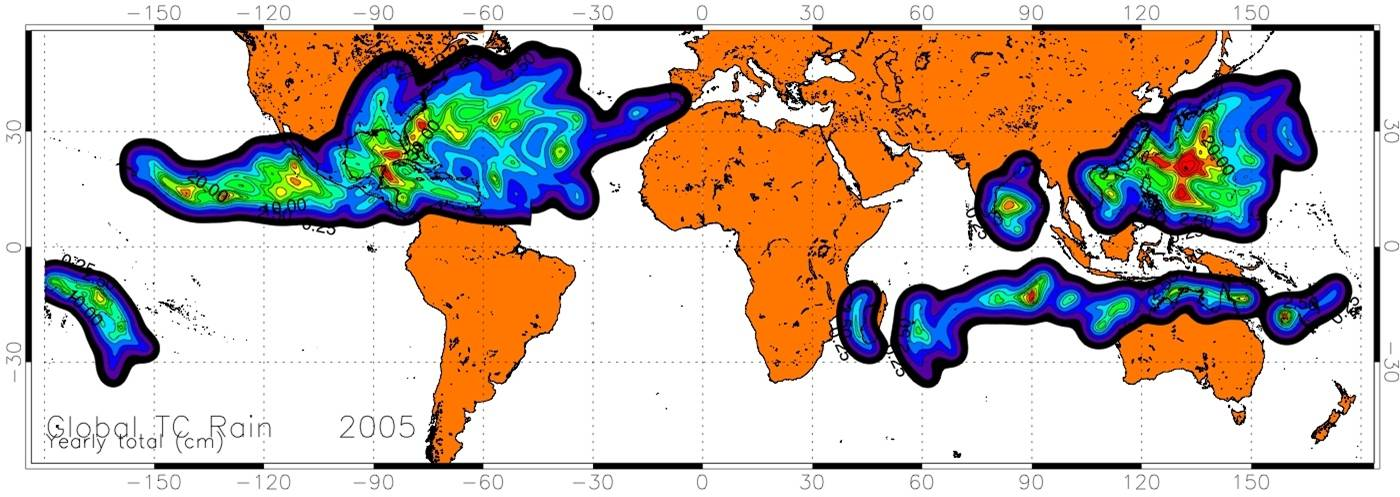
Global tropical cyclone rainfall in 2005

Globally, tropical cyclone rainfall is more common across the northern hemisphere than across the southern hemisphere. This is mainly due to the normal annual tropical cyclone distribution, as between half and two-thirds of all tropical cyclones form north of the equator. Rainfall is concentrated near the 15th parallel in both hemispheres, with a less steep dropoff seen with latitude across the northern hemisphere, due to the stronger warm water currents seen in that hemisphere, which allow tropical cyclones to remain tropical in nature at higher latitudes than south of the equator. In the southern hemisphere, rainfall impacts will be most common between January and March, while north of the equator, tropical cyclone rainfall impacts are more common between June and November. Japan receives over half of its rainfall from typhoons.

== United States tropical cyclone rainfall statistics ==
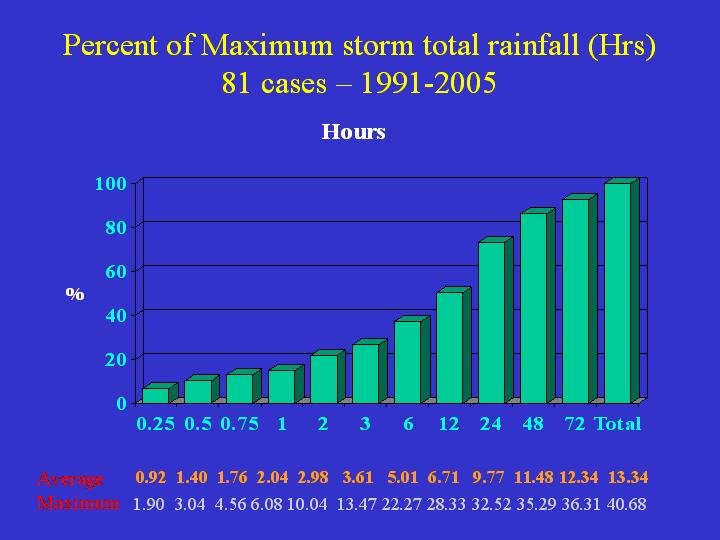
U.S. Tropical Cyclone Rainfall Accumulations per time frame

Between 1970 and 2004, inland flooding caused a majority of the tropical cyclone-related fatalities in the United States. This statistic changed in 2005, when Hurricane Katrina's impact alone shifted the most deadly aspect of tropical cyclones back to storm surge, which has historically been the most deadly aspect of strong tropical cyclones. On average, five tropical cyclones of at least tropical depression strength lead to rainfall across the contiguous United States annually, contributing around a quarter of the annual rainfall to the southeast United States. While many of these storms form in the Atlantic basin, some systems or their remnants move through Mexico from the Eastern Pacific basin. The average storm total rainfall for a tropical cyclone impacting the lower 48 from the Atlantic basin is about 16 inches (410 mm), with 70–75 percent of the storm total falling within a 24-hour period. The highest point total was seen during Hurricane Harvey in 2017, when 60.58 inches (1,539 mm) fell in southeast Texas.

== See also ==
- China tropical cyclone rainfall climatology
- Extratropical cyclone
- List of wettest tropical cyclones
- List of wettest tropical cyclones by country
- Tropical cyclone
- Tropical cyclone rainfall forecasting
- Tropical cyclogenesis

== Printed media ==
1. Ivan Ray Tannehill. Hurricanes. Princeton University Press: Princeton, 1942.
2. Herbert Riehl. Tropical Meteorology. McGraw-Hill Book Company, Inc.: New York, 1954.
3. Terry Tucker. Beware the Hurricane! Hamilton Press: Bermuda, 1966.

== Related external links ==
- Individual Tropical Cyclone Rainfall Pages for the United States and Mexico
- Individual Tropical Cyclone Rainfall Pages for Puerto Rico/U.S. Virgin Islands
- Maximum amounts in the lower 48 United States by state
- Typhoon Rainfall Statistics and Forecasting (China)
- Deadliest, Costliest, and Most Intense United States Tropical Cyclones From 1851 to 2004
- Are You Ready? Hurricanes
