= Tropical cyclone forecasting =

Science of forecasting how a tropical cyclone moves and its effects

Tropical cyclone forecasting is the science of forecasting where a tropical cyclone's center, and its effects, are expected to be at some point in the future. There are several elements to tropical cyclone forecasting: track forecasting, intensity forecasting, rainfall forecasting, storm surge, tornado, and seasonal forecasting. While skill is increasing in regard to track forecasting, intensity forecasting skill remains unchanged over the past several years. Seasonal forecasting began in the 1980s in the Atlantic basin and has spread into other basins in the years since.

== History ==
=== Short term ===
The methods through which tropical cyclones are forecast have changed with the passage of time. The first known forecasts in the Western Hemisphere were made by Lt. Col. William Reed of the Corps of Royal Engineers at Barbados in 1847. Reed mostly utilized barometric pressure measurements as the basis of his forecasts. Benito Vines introduced a forecast and warning system based on cloud cover changes in Havana during the 1870s. Before the early 1900s, though, most forecasts were done by direct observations at weather stations, which were then relayed to forecast centres via telegraph. It wasn't until the advent of radio in the early twentieth century that observations from ships at sea were available to forecasters. The 1930s saw the usage of radiosondes in tropical cyclone forecasting. The next decade saw the advent of aircraft-based reconnaissance by the military, starting with the first dedicated flight into a hurricane in 1943, and the establishment of the Hurricane Hunters in 1944. In the 1950s, coastal weather radars began to be used in the United States, and research reconnaissance flights by the precursor of the Hurricane Research Division began in 1954.

The launch of the first weather satellite, TIROS-I, in 1960, introduced new forecasting techniques that remain important to tropical cyclone forecasting to the present. In the 1970s, buoys were introduced to improve the resolution of surface measurements, which until that point, were not available at all oversea surfaces.

=== Long term ===
In the late 1970s, William Gray noticed a trend of low hurricane activity in the North Atlantic basin during El Niño years. He was the first researcher to make a connection between such events and positive results led him to pursue further research. He found numerous factors across the globe influence tropical cyclone activity, such as connecting wet periods over the African Sahel to an increase in major hurricane landfalls along the United States East Coast. However, his findings also showed inconsistencies when only looking at a single factor as a primary influence.

Utilizing his findings, Gray developed an objective, statistical forecast for seasonal hurricane activity; he predicted only the number of tropical storms, hurricanes, and major hurricanes, foregoing specifics on tracks and potential landfalls due to the aforementioned inconsistencies. Gray issued his first seasonal forecast ahead of the 1984 season, which used the statistical relationships between tropical cyclone activity, the El Niño–Southern Oscillation (ENSO), Quasi-biennial oscillation (QBO), and Caribbean basin sea-level pressures. The endeavour proved modestly successful. He subsequently issued forecasts ahead of the start of the Atlantic hurricane season in May and before the peak of the season in August. Students and colleagues joined his forecast team in the following years, including Christopher Landsea, Paul W. Mielke Jr., and Kenneth J. Berry.

== Track ==
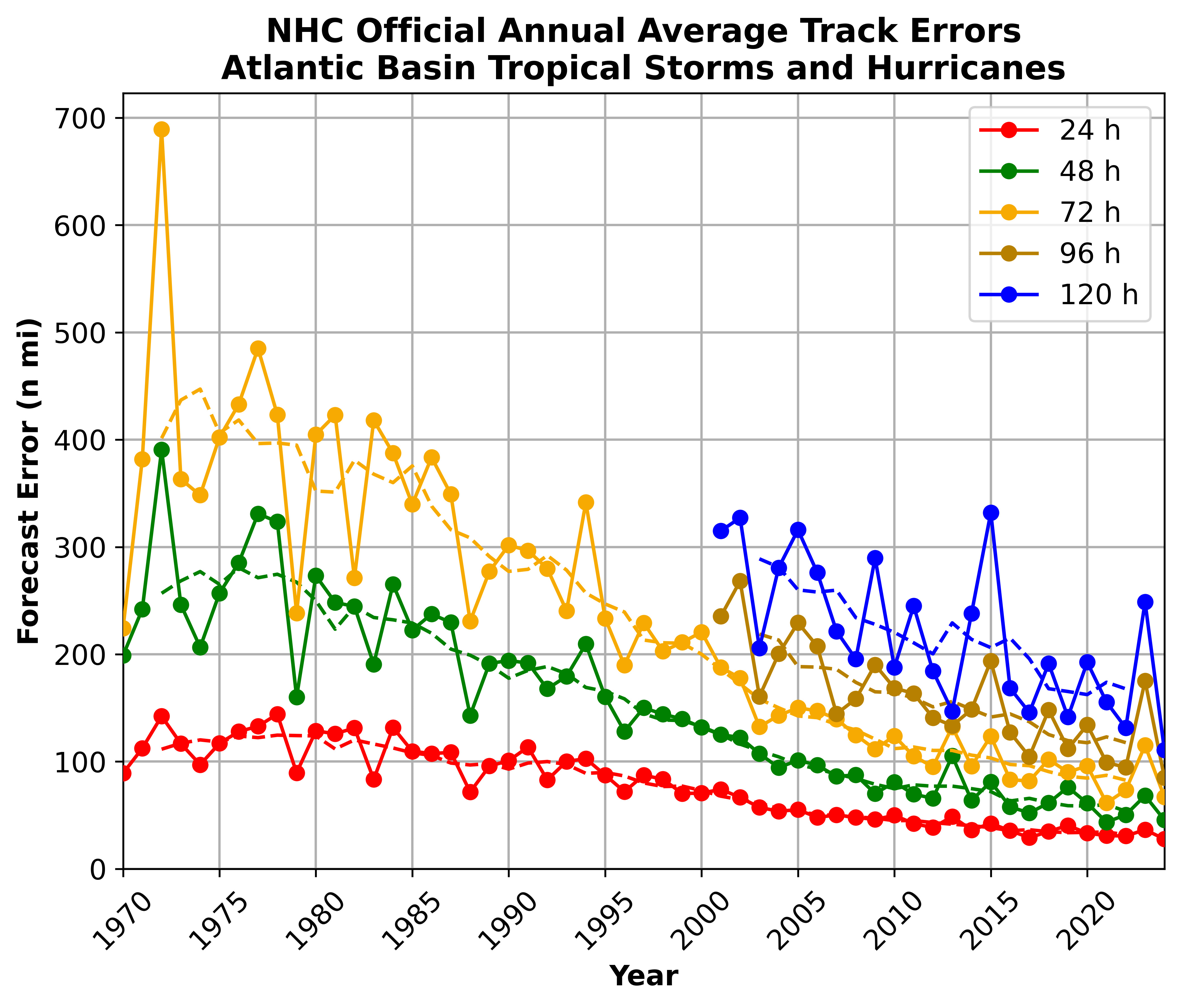
Track errors for the Atlantic Basin since 1970

The large-scale synoptic flow determines 70 to 90 percent of a tropical cyclone's motion. The deep-layer mean flow is the best tool in determining track direction and speed. If storms are significantly sheared, use of a lower-level wind is a better predictor. Knowledge of the beta effect can be used to steer a tropical cyclone, since it leads to a more northwest heading for tropical cyclones in the Northern Hemisphere. It is also best to smooth out short term wobbles of the storm centre to determine a more accurate trajectory.

Because of the forces that affect tropical cyclone tracks, accurate track predictions depend on determining the position and strength of high- and low-pressure areas and predicting how those areas will change during the life of a tropical system. Combining forecast models with increased understanding of the forces that act on tropical cyclones, and a wealth of data from Earth-orbiting satellites and other sensors, scientists have increased the accuracy of track forecasts over recent decades. An accurate track forecast is important, because if the track forecast is incorrect, forecasts for intensity, rainfall, storm surge, and tornado threat will also be incorrect.

=== 1-2-3 rule ===
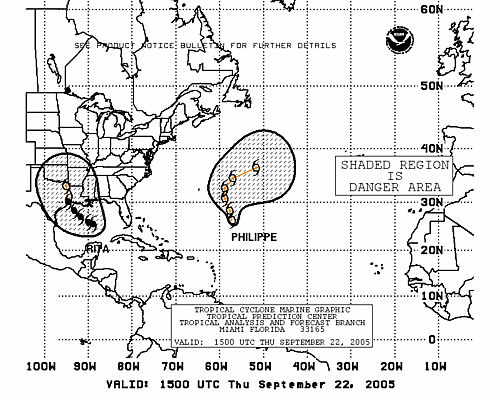
Hurricanes Rita and Philippe shown with 1-2-3 rule predictions.

The 1-2-3 rule (mariner's 1-2-3 rule or danger area) is a guideline commonly taught to mariners for severe storm (specifically hurricane and tropical storm) tracking and prediction. The 1-2-3 rule has two parts, the 34-Knot Rule which is the danger area to be avoided. The 1-2-3 rule itself refers to the rounded long-term NHC/TPC forecast errors of 100-200-300 nautical miles at 24-48-72 hours, respectively. These numbers were close to the 10-year average for the 1982–1991-time frame. However, these errors have decreased to near 50-100-150 as NHC forecasters become more accurate. The "danger area" to be avoided is constructed by expanding the forecast path by a radius equal to the respective hundreds of miles plus the forecast 34-Knot wind field radii.

== Intensity ==
Forecasters say they are less skilful at predicting the intensity of tropical cyclones than cyclone track. Available computing power limits forecasters' ability to accurately model a large number of complex factors, such as exact topology and atmospheric conditions, though with increased experience and understanding, even models with the same resolution can be tuned to more accurately reflect real-world behaviour. Another weakness is lack of frequent wind speed measurements in the eye of the storm. The Cyclone Global Navigation Satellite System, launched by NASA in 2016, is expected to provide much more data compared to sporadic measurements by weather buoys and hurricane-penetrating aircraft.

An accurate track forecast is essential to creating accurate intensity forecasts, particularly in an area with large islands such as the western north Pacific and the Caribbean Sea, as proximity to land is an inhibiting factor to developing tropical cyclones. A strong hurricane/typhoon/cyclone can weaken if an outer eye wall forms (typically around 80–160 kilometres (50–99 mi) from the centre of the storm), choking off the convection within the inner eye wall. Such weakening is called an eyewall replacement cycle, and is usually temporary.

=== Maximum potential intensity ===
Dr. Kerry Emanuel created a mathematical model around 1988, called the maximum potential intensity or MPI, to compute the upper limit of tropical cyclone intensity based on sea surface temperature and atmospheric profiles from the latest global model runs. Maps created from this equation show values of the maximum achievable intensity due to the thermodynamics of the atmosphere at the time of the last model run (either 0000 or 1200 UTC). However, MPI does not take vertical wind shear into account. MPI is computed using the following formula:

$V = A + B \cdot e^{C(T-T_0)}$

Where $V$ is the maximum potential velocity in meters per second; $T$ is the sea surface temperature underneath the center of the tropical cyclone, $T_0$ is a reference temperature (30 °C) and $A$, $B$ and $C$ are curve-fit constants. When $A = 28.2$, $B = 55.8$, and $C = 0.1813$, the graph generated by this function corresponds to the 99th percentile of empirical tropical cyclone intensity data.

== Rainfall ==
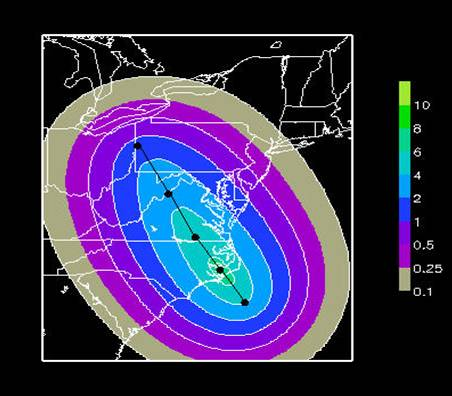
r-CLIPER for Isabel (2003)

Tropical cyclone rainfall forecasting is important, since between 1970 and 2004, inland flooding from tropical cyclones caused most of the fatalities from tropical cyclones in the United States. While flooding is common to tropical cyclones near a landmass, there are a few factors which lead to excessive rainfall from tropical cyclones. Slow motion, as was seen during Hurricane Danny and Hurricane Wilma, can lead to high amounts. The presence of topography near the coast, as is the case across much of Mexico, Haiti, the Dominican Republic, much of Central America, Madagascar, Réunion, China, and Japan acts to magnify amounts due to upslope flow into the mountains. Strong upper level forcing from a trough moving through the Westerlies, as was the case during Hurricane Floyd, can lead to excessive amounts even from systems moving at an average forward motion. A combination of two of these factors could be especially crippling, as was seen during Hurricane Mitch in Central America. Therefore, an accurate track forecast is essential in order to produce an accurate tropical cyclone rainfall forecast. However, as a result of global warming, the heat that has built up on the ocean's surface has allowed storms and hurricanes to capture more water vapour and, given the increased temperatures in the atmosphere also, retain the moisture for a longer capacity. This results in incredible amounts of rainfall upon striking land which can often be the most damaging aspect of a hurricane.

== Operational methods ==
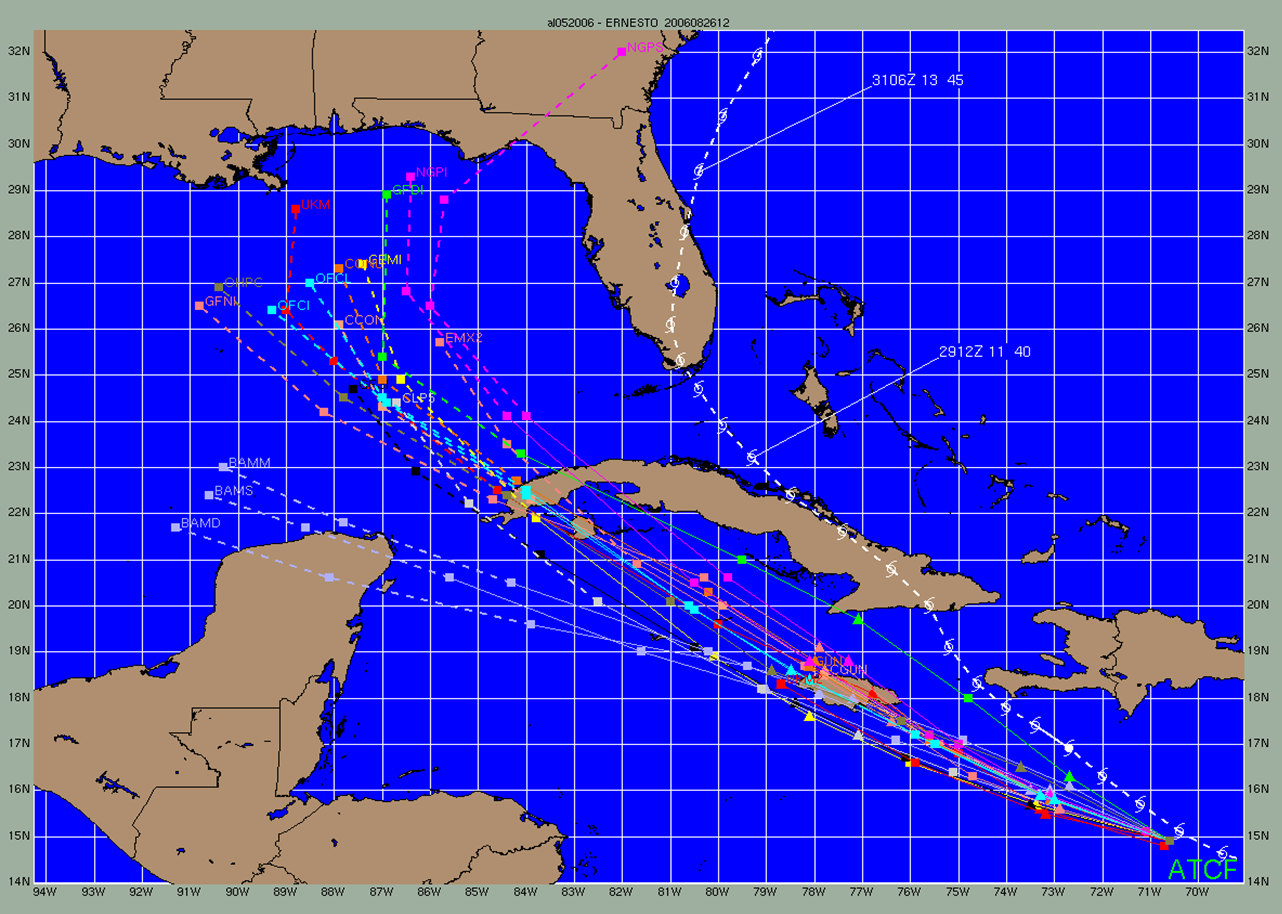
Forecast model tracks within ATCF. The NHC official forecast for Ernesto (2006) is light blue, while the storm's actual track is the white line over Florida.

Historically, tropical cyclone tracking charts were used to include the past track and prepare future forecasts at Regional Specialized Meteorological Centers and Tropical Cyclone Warning Centers. The need for a more modernized method for forecasting tropical cyclones had become apparent to operational weather forecasters by the mid-1980s. At that time the United States Department of Defense was using paper maps, acetate, grease pencils, and disparate computer programs to forecast tropical cyclones. The Automated Tropical Cyclone Forecasting System (ATCF) software was developed by the Naval Research Laboratory for the Joint Typhoon Warning Center (JTWC) beginning in 1986, and used since 1988. During 1990 the system was adapted by the National Hurricane Center (NHC) for use at the NHC, National Centers for Environmental Prediction and the Central Pacific Hurricane Center. This provided the NHC with a multitasking software environment which allowed them to improve efficiency and cut the time required to make a forecast by 25% or 1 hour. ATCF was originally developed for MS-DOS, before being adapted to Unix and Linux.

== Storm surge ==
The main storm surge forecast model in the Atlantic basin is SLOSH, which stands for Sea, Lake, Overland, Surge from Hurricanes. It uses the size of a storm, its intensity, its forward motion, and the topography of the coastal plain to estimate the depth of a storm surge at any individual grid point across the United States. An accurate forecast track is required in order to produce accurate storm surge forecasts. However, if the landfall point is uncertain, a maximum envelope of water (MEOW) map can be generated based on the direction of approach. If the forecast track itself is also uncertain, a maximum of maximums (MoM) map can be generated which will show the worst possible scenario for a hurricane of a specific strength.

== Tornado ==
The location of most tropical cyclone-related tornadoes is their northeast quadrant in the Northern Hemisphere and southeast quadrant in the Southern Hemisphere. Like most of the other forecasts for tropical cyclone effects, an accurate track forecast is required in order to produce an accurate tornado threat forecast.

== Seasonal forecast ==
By looking at annual variations in various climate parameters, forecasters can make predictions about the overall number and intensity of tropical cyclones that will occur in a given season. For example, when constructing its seasonal outlooks, the Climate Prediction Center in the United States considers the effects of the El Niño-Southern Oscillation, 25–40 year tropical cycle, wind shear over the oceans, and ocean surface temperature.

== See also ==
- Hebert Box
