= Turner angle =

Parameter describing stability of a water column

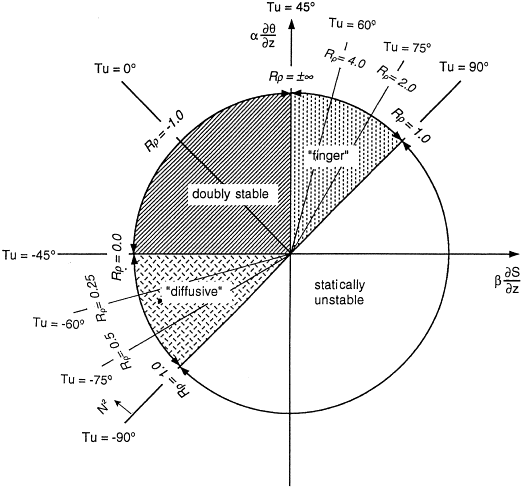
This sketch illustrates the definition of the Turner angle, Tu(degree), with corresponding Density ratio value indicated. Double-diffusion is scaled in low, medium, and strong conditions.

The Turner angle Tu, introduced by Ruddick (1983) and named after J. Stewart Turner, is a parameter used to describe the local stability of an inviscid water column as it undergoes double-diffusive convection. The temperature and salinity attributes, which generally determine the water density, both respond to the water vertical structure. By putting these two variables in orthogonal coordinates, the angle with the axis can indicate the importance of the two in stability. The Turner angle is defined as

$$Tu(\deg)=\tan^{-1}\left ( \alpha \frac{\partial \theta}{\partial z}-\beta \frac{\partial S}{\partial z}, \alpha \frac{\partial \theta}{\partial z}+\beta \frac{\partial S}{\partial z} \right ),$$

where tan^{−1} is the four-quadrant arctangent, α is the coefficient of thermal expansion, β is the equivalent coefficient for the addition of salinity, sometimes referred to as the "coefficient of saline contraction", θ is potential temperature, and S is salinity. The relation between Tu and stability is as follows:

- If −45° < Tu < 45°, then the column is statically stable.
- If −90° < Tu < −45°, then the column is unstable to diffusive convection.
- If 45° < Tu < 90°, then the column is unstable to salt fingering.
- If −90° > Tu or Tu > 90°, then the column is statically unstable to Rayleigh–Taylor instability.

== Relation to density ratio ==
The Turner angle is related to the density ratio mathematically by

$$R_\rho=-\tan(Tu+45^\circ).$$

Meanwhile, the Turner angle has more advantages than density ratio in aspects of:

- The infinite scale of R_{ρ} is replaced by a finite one running from +π to -π;
- The strong-fingering (1 < R_{ρ} < 2) and weak-fingering (2 < R_{ρ} < ∞) regions occupy about the same space on the Tu scale;
- The indeterminate value obtained when ∂_{z}S = 0 is well defined in terms of Tu;
- The regimes and their corresponding angles are easy to remember, and symmetric in the sense that if Tu corresponds to R_{ρ}, then –Tu corresponds to R^{−1}_{ρ}. This links roughly equal strengths of finger- and diffusive-sense convection.

Nevertheless, the Turner angle is not as directly obvious as the density ratio when assessing different attributions of thermal and haline stratification. Its strength mainly focuses on classification.

== Physical description ==
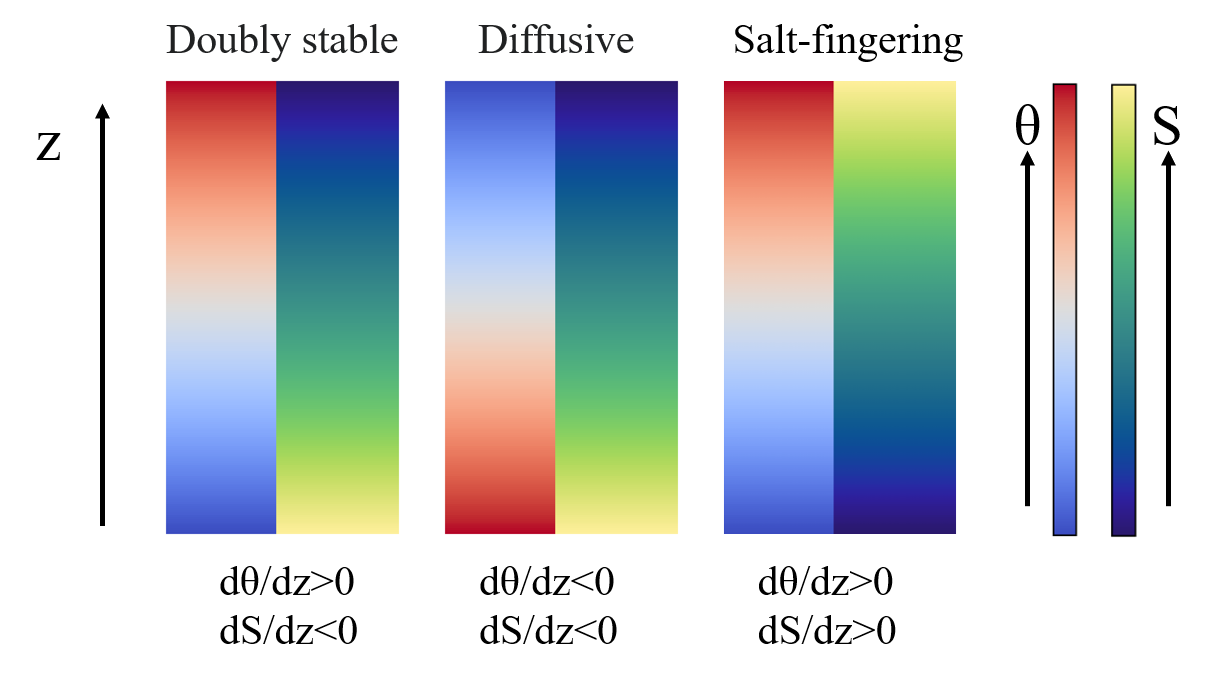
Sketch of ocean thermal and haline stratification, indicating "doubly stable", "diffusive", and "salt-fingering" respectively.

The Turner angle is usually discussed when researching ocean stratification and double diffusion.

The Turner angle assesses the vertical stability, indicating how the density of the water column changes with depth. The density is generally related to the potential temperature and salinity profile: the cooler and saltier the water is, the denser it is. When light water overlays dense water, the water column is stably stratified. The buoyancy force preserves stable stratification. The Brunt-Vaisala frequency (N) is a measure of stability. If N^{2} > 0, then the fluid is stably stratified.

A stably-stratified fluid may be doubly stable. For instance, in the ocean, if the temperature decreases with depth (∂θ/∂z > 0) and salinity increases with depth (∂S/∂z < 0), then that part of the ocean is stably stratified with respect to both θ and S. In this state, the Turner angle is between –45° and 45°.

However, the fluid column can maintain static stability even if two attributes have opposite effects on the stability; the effect of one just has to have the predominant effect, overwhelming the smaller effect. In this sort of stable stratification, double diffusion occurs. Both attributes diffuse in opposite directions, reducing stability and causing mixing and turbulence. If the slower-diffusing component is the one that is stably stratified, then the vertical gradient will stay smooth. If the faster-diffusing component is the one providing stability, then the interface will develop long "fingers", as diffusion will create pockets of fluid with intermediate attributes, but not intermediate density.

In the ocean, heat diffuses faster than salt. If colder, fresher water overlies warmer, saltier water, then the salinity structure is stable while the temperature structure is unstable (∂θ/∂z < 0 and ∂S/∂z < 0). In these diffusive cases, the Turner angle is –45° to –90°. If warmer, saltier water overlies colder, fresher water (∂θ/∂z > 0 and ∂S/∂z > 0), then salt fingering can be expected. This is because patchy mixing will create pockets of cold, salty water and pockets of warm, fresh water, and these pockets will sink and rise. In these fingering cases, the Turner angle is 45° to 90°.

Since the Turner angle can indicate the thermal and haline properties of the water column, it is used to discuss thermohaline water structures. For instance, it can be used to define the boundaries of the subarctic front.

== Characteristics ==
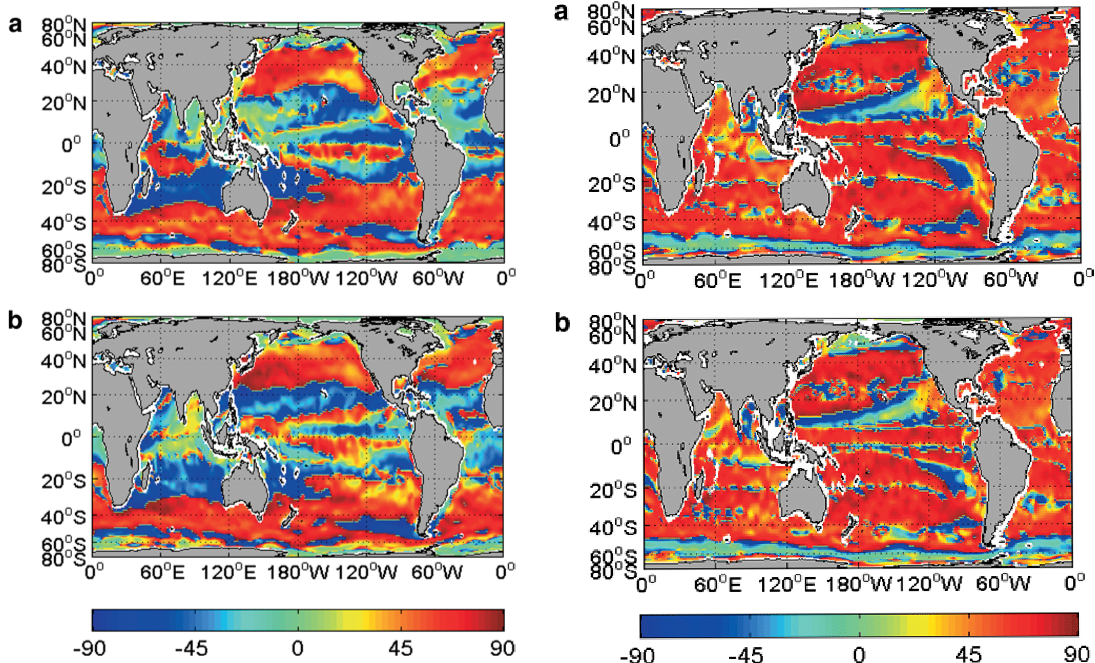
Global distribution of the meridional Turner angle Tu at the sea surface (left panel) and 300m depth (right panel). a: July–September, b: January–March, in Gall-Peters projection.

The global meridional Turner angle distributions at the surface and 300-meter depth in different seasons are investigated by Tippins, Duncan & Tomczak, Matthias (2003), which indicates the overall stability of the ocean over a long timescale. The 300-meter depth is deep enough to be beneath the mixed layer during all seasons over most of the subtropics, yet shallow enough to be located entirely in the permanent thermocline, even in the tropics.

At the surface, as the temperature and salinity increase from the Subpolar Front towards subtropics, the Turner angle is positive, while it becomes negative due to the meridional salinity gradient being reversed on the equatorial side of the subtropical surface salinity maximum. Tu becomes positive again in the Pacific and Atlantic Oceans near the equator. A band of negative Tu in the South Pacific extends westward along 45°S, produced by the low salinities because of plenty of rainfall, off the southern coast of Chile.

At a depth of 300 m, it is dominated by positive Tu nearly everywhere except for only narrow bands of negative Turner angles. This reflects the shape of the permanent thermocline, which sinks to its greatest depth in the center of the oceanic gyres and then rises again towards the equator, and which also indicates a vertical structure in temperature and salinity where both decrease with depth.
