= Oceanic freshwater flux =

Freshwater fluxes into and out of the world's oceans

Oceanic freshwater fluxes are defined as the transport of non saline water between the oceans and the other components of the Earth's system (the lands, the atmosphere and the cryosphere). These fluxes have an impact on the local ocean properties (on sea surface salinity, temperature and elevation), as well as on the large scale circulation patterns (such as the thermohaline circulation).

== Introduction ==
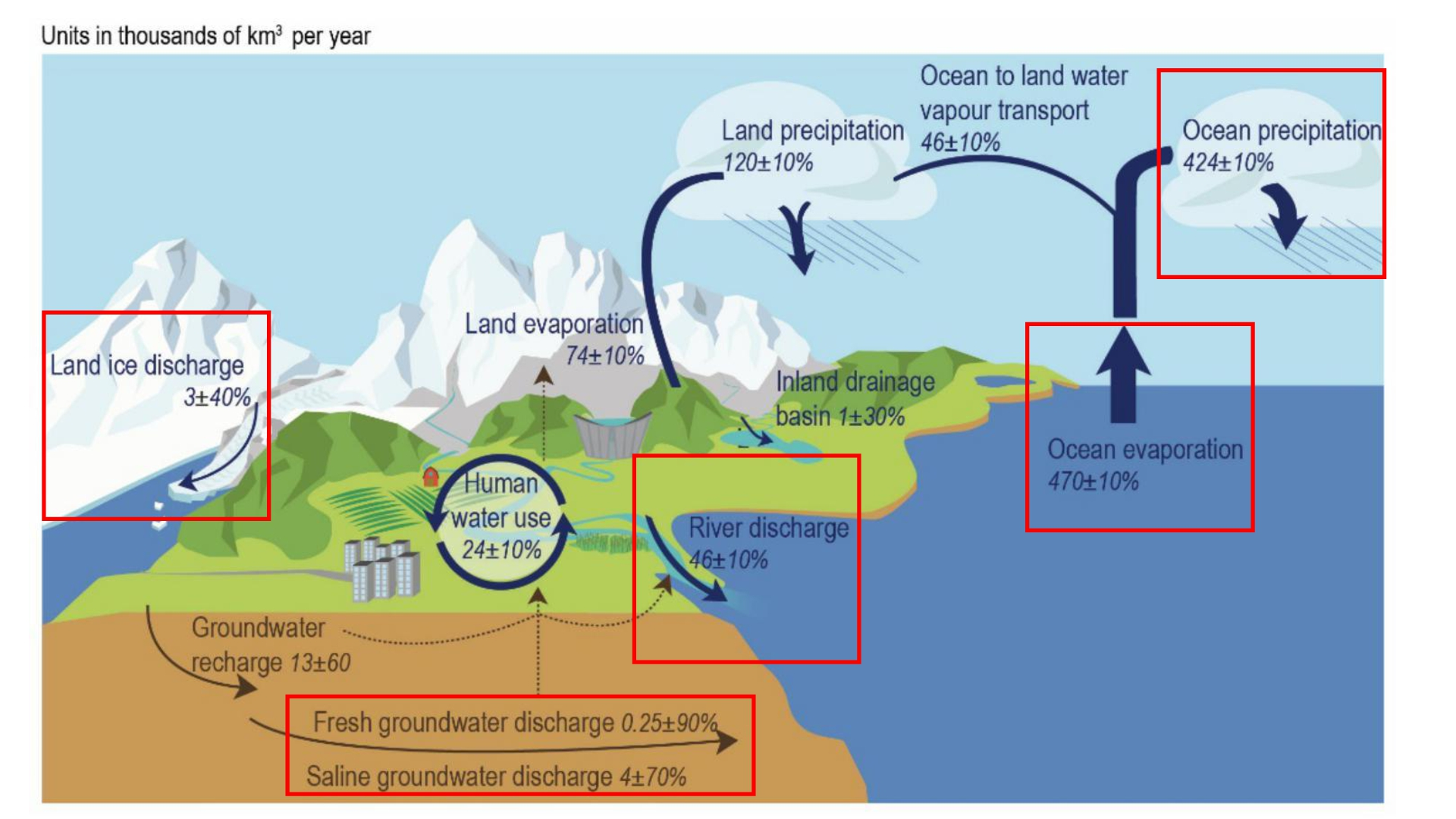
Shows the freshwater fluxes between the earth's systems (ocean, cryosphere, atmosphere, terrestrial water storages), whereby the oceanic freshwater fluxes are highlighted. Figure adapted from AR6 IPCC report of WG1, Chapter 8.

Freshwater fluxes in general describe how freshwater is transported between and stored in the earth's systems: oceans, land, the atmosphere and the cryosphere. While the total amount of water on Earth has remained virtually constant over human timescales, the relative distribution of that total mass between the four reservoirs has been influenced by past climate states, such as glacial cycles. Since the oceans account for 71% of the Earth's surface area, 86% of evaporation (E) and 78% of precipitation (P) occur over the ocean, the oceanic freshwater fluxes represent a large part of the world's freshwater fluxes.

There are five major freshwater fluxes into and out of the ocean, namely:

1. Precipitation
2. Evaporation
3. Riverine discharge
4. Ice freezing or melting (Sea ice freezing or melting, ice shelf melting, iceberg melting)
5. Groundwater discharge

whereby the 1., 3. and 5. are all inputs, adding freshwater to the ocean, while 2. is an output, i.e. a negative freshwater flux and 4. can be either a freshwater loss (freezing) or gain (melting).

The quantity and the spatial distribution of those fluxes determine the ocean salinity (the salt concentration of the ocean water). A positive freshwater flux leads to mixing of water with low to zero salinity with the salty ocean water, resulting in a decrease of the water salinity. This is for example the case in regions, where precipitation is greater than evaporation. On the contrary, if evaporation gets greater than precipitation, the ocean salinity increases, since only water ($\ce{H2O}$) evaporates, but not the ions (e.g. $\ce{Na+}$, $\ce{Cl+}$) which make up salt.

Estimates of the annual mean freshwater fluxes into the ocean are $424\pm10 \%\,\mathrm{km^3/yr}$ for precipitation (88% of total freshwater input), $46\pm10 \%\,\mathrm{km^3/yr}$ for riverine discharge from land (9%), $3\pm40 \%\,\mathrm{km^3/yr}$ for ice discharge from land (<1%) and $0.25\pm90 \%\,\mathrm{km^3/yr}$ and $4\pm70 \%\,\mathrm{km^3/yr}$ for saline and fresh groundwater discharge respectively (<1%). The annual mean freshwater fluxes out of the ocean via evaporation is estimated to be $470\pm10 \%\,\mathrm{km^3/yr}$.

The salinity, along with temperature and pressure, determines the density of the water. Higher salinity and cooler water results in a higher water density (see also spiciness of ocean water). Since differences in water density drive large-scale ocean circulation, freshwater fluxes are most important for ocean circulation patterns like the Thermohaline Circulation (THC).

== Freshwater fluxes into the ocean ==
=== Evaporation and precipitation ===
There are large spatial and temporal variations in precipitation and evaporation patterns. The dominant reason for precipitation is adiabatic cooling when moist air rises, whose water vapor then becomes supersaturated above a certain altitude and condenses out. Areas of large precipitation are therefore areas of convection, which is most prominent in the Intertropical Convergence Zone (ITCZ), a band of latitudes around the equator.

Evaporation describes the process when surface water changes its phase from liquid to gaseous. This process requires a high amount of energy, due to the strong hydrogen bonds between the water molecules. This results in a global evaporation pattern, where high evaporation rates can be observed mostly in warm tropical and subtropical regions, where the surface was heated by solar radiation which can provide the necessary amount of energy. At higher latitudes the evaporation rate decreases. Additionally, the evaporation rate is influenced by the relative humidity of the air overlying the water surface. Approaching the saturation of the air with water vapour, the evaporation rate decreases, i.e. a lower air–sea humidity gradient decreases evaporation.

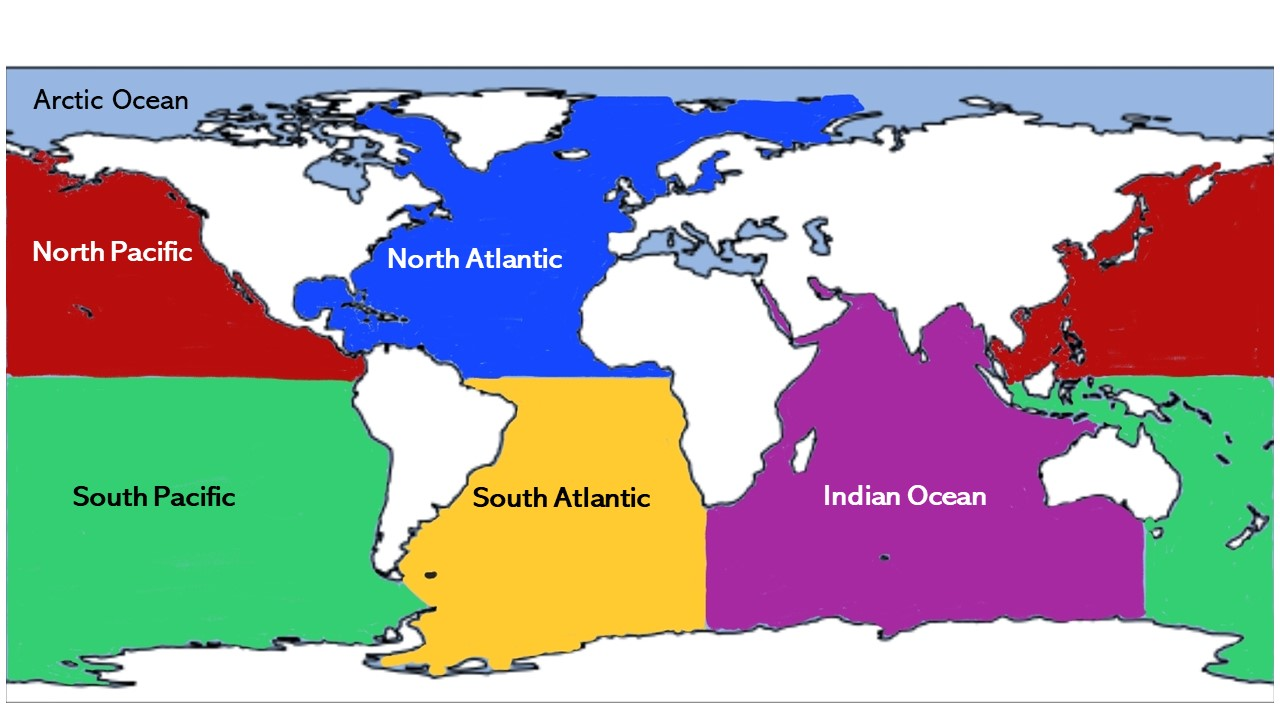
Main Ocean basins: North and South Pacific, North and South Atlantic and the Indian Ocean.

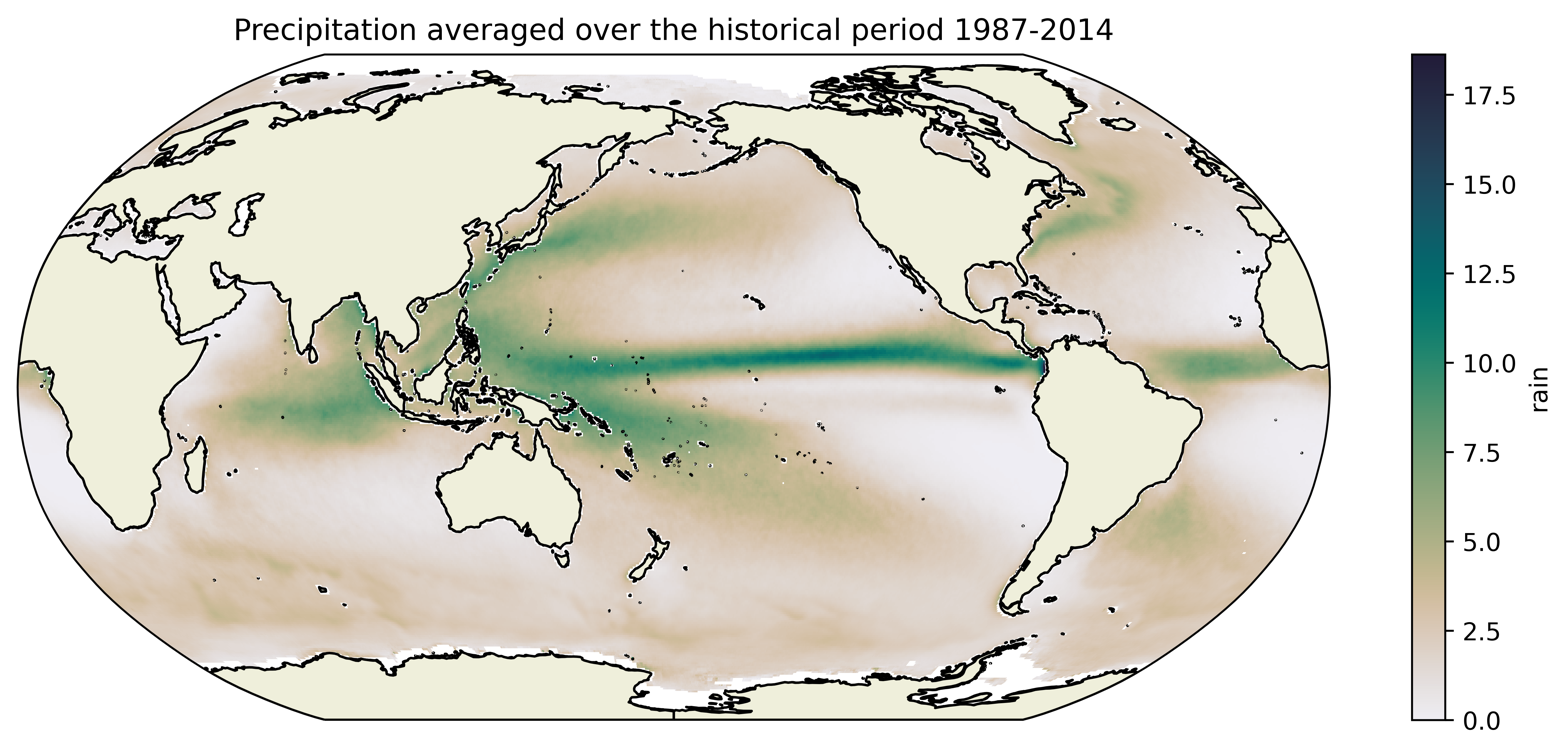
Precipitation [mm/day] over the ocean, averaged over the time period 1987–2014. Data from: Hamburg Ocean Atmosphere Parameters and Fluxes from Satellite Data - HOAPS 4.0

The actual freshwater flux that the ocean experiences in a certain timeframe is the net amount of precipitation and evaporation in this time interval. This means, if evaporation minus precipitation (E-P) is positive, the ocean experiences a net loss of freshwater, while the opposite is true for a negative value for E-P. On a global scale, the subtropical gyres and western boundary currents of the Atlantic, Pacific and Indian Oceans are regions where evaporation exceeds precipitation. In contrast, the ITCZ as well as high latitudes (> 40° N/S) are regions of net precipitation, although the ITCZ exceeds the high latitudes in terms of quantity of rainfall. The equatorial region of net precipitation is centered north of the equator in the Atlantic and Pacific Oceans but is broader and extends further south in the Indian Ocean. An additional center of strong net precipitation is located over the western Pacific-Indonesian region.

Both Atlantic subtropical gyres are net evaporative, as well as the Pacific subtropical gyres, although they show an east–west transition with increased evaporation near the eastern boundaries. This spatial pattern can be attributed to the fact that the overlying air becomes saturated in humidity, subsequently leading to decreasing evaporation rates as the air is driven westward by the trade winds.

An estimation of the annual mean freshwater flux into the ocean is $424.10^3 \pm10 \%\,\mathrm{km^3/yr}$ for precipitation, while annual mean freshwater flux out of the ocean via evaporation is estimated to be $470.10^3 \pm10 \%\,\mathrm{km^3/yr}$.

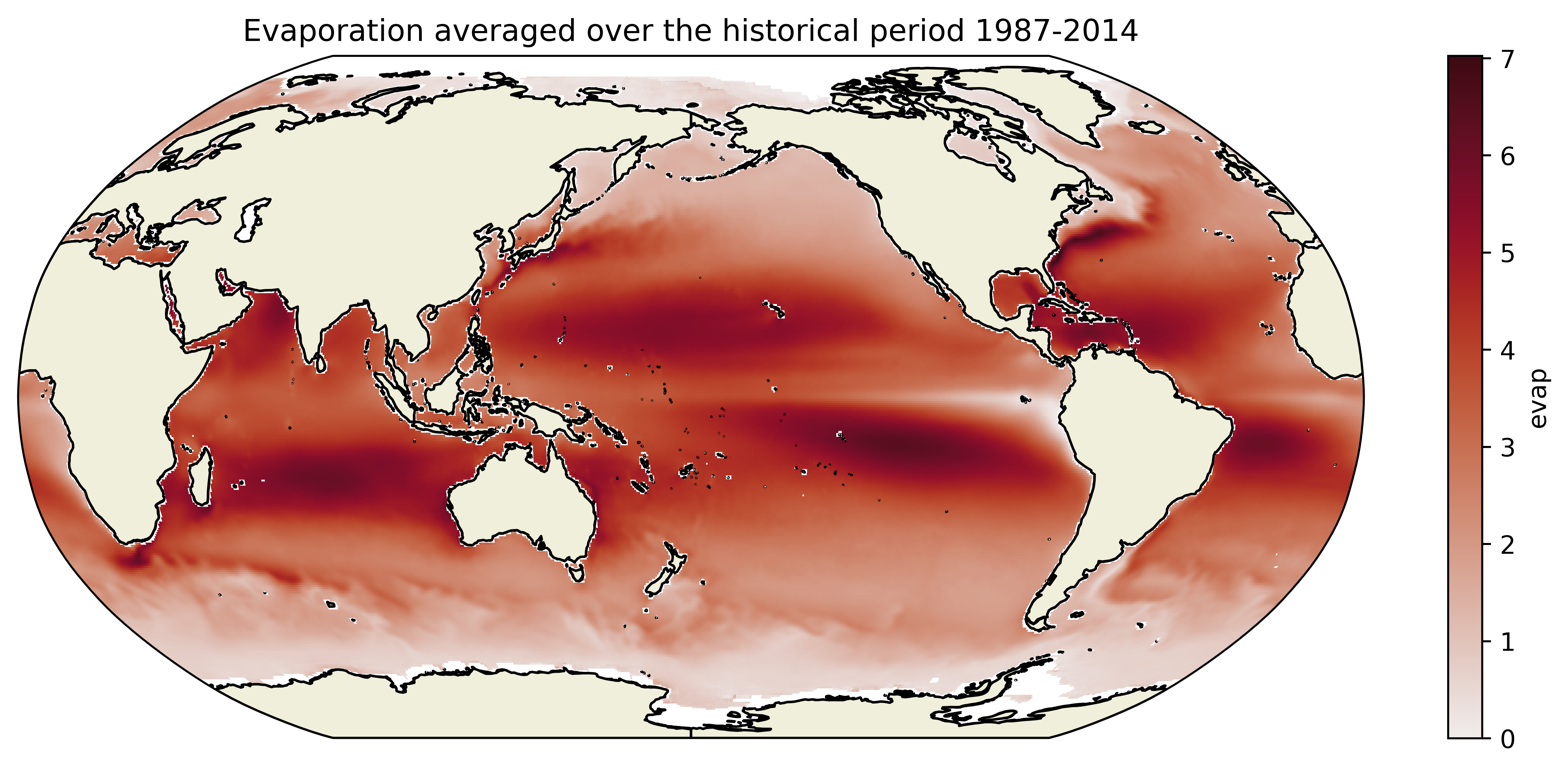
Evaporation [mm/day] over the ocean, averaged over the time period 1987–2014. Data from: Hamburg Ocean Atmosphere Parameters and Fluxes from Satellite Data - HOAPS 4.0

When considering all the ocean basins, the only ocean basin which experiences net precipitation averaged over the year, is the North Pacific. The other ocean basins, namely the South Pacific, the North and South Atlantic and the Indian Ocean are areas of net evaporation, albeit with varying strength. The net evaporation over the South Pacific Ocean is distinctly smaller than over the other ocean basins, although the South Pacific Ocean covers an area as large the whole Atlantic Ocean and one third larger than the Indian Ocean.

It is very likely that the energy increase (heat flux) observed in the upper 700 m of the global oceans can be attributed to anthropogenic climate change and increased radiative forcing due to greenhouse gas emissions. Although observed trends in evaporation minus precipitation suggest that the Atlantic Ocean will become saltier, while the Indian Ocean will become fresher in the coming decades, it is easier to project global patterns of air-sea flux based on changes in heat content and salinity while regional trends are rarely robust.

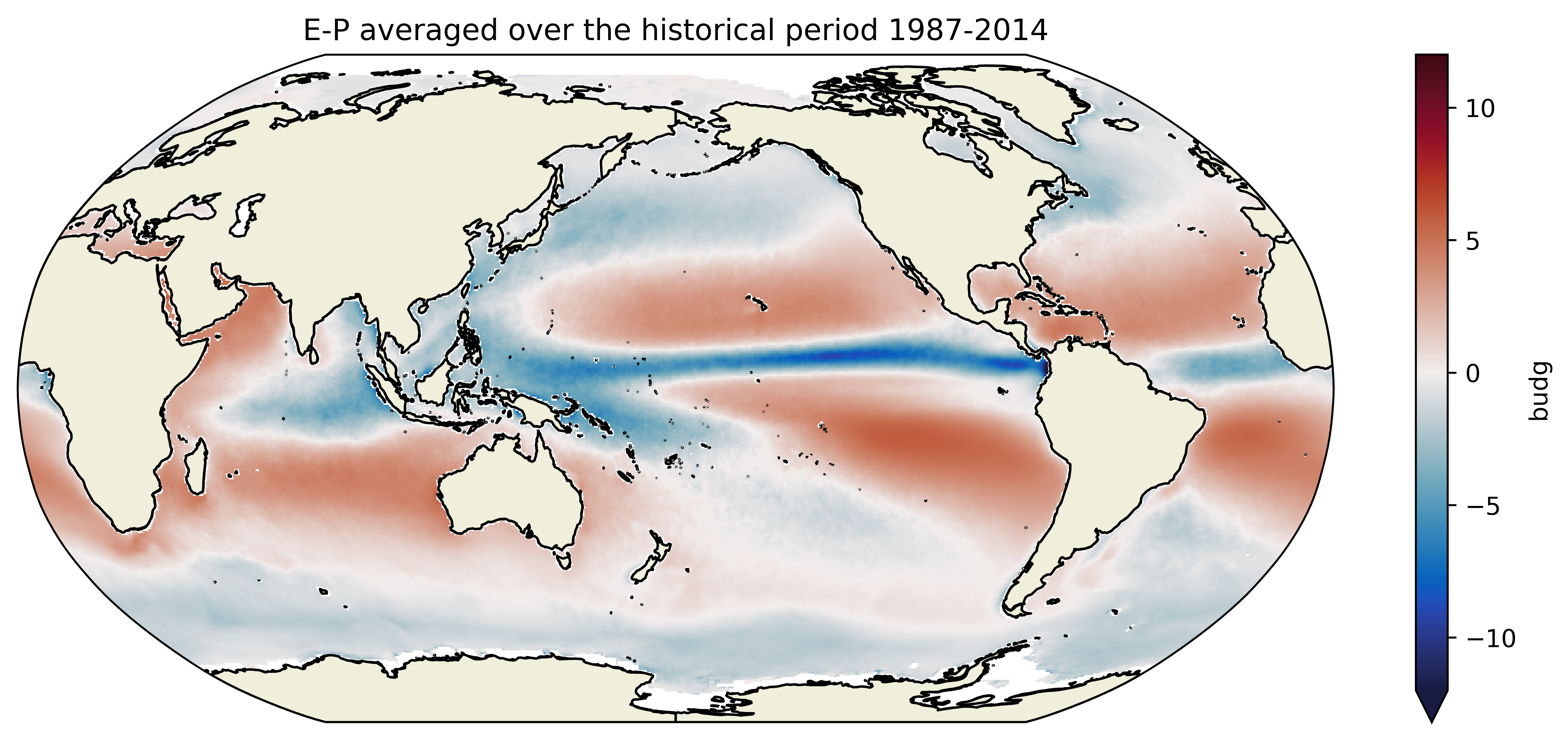
Evaporation minus precipitation [mm/day] over the ocean, averaged over the time period 1987–2014. Data from: Hamburg Ocean Atmosphere Parameters and Fluxes from Satellite Data - HOAPS 4.0

==== Seasonal cycle ====
The amount and even the sign of the net total freshwater flux E-P from an ocean basin can change throughout the year.

The net evaporation over much of the subtropics is most pronounced during winter season due to the increased strength of the easterly trades in winter. This applies for both hemispheres. The wind impacts evaporation in two ways. Firstly directly, whereby a greater wind speed carries water vapour faster away from the evaporating surface, leading to a faster reestablishment of the air–sea humidity gradient, which was reduced by the evaporation beforehand and is necessary for high evaporation rates. Secondly indirectly, since enhanced surface wind strengthens the wind-driven subtropical gyre. Since the subtropical gyres drive a northwards heat transport via the western boundary currents, the sea surface temperatures warm up along the paths of the currents and cause more evaporation by providing more energy and enlarging the air–sea humidity gradients. In the extratropics the net precipitation is not explainable by a simple seasonal cycle. In the Atlantic and Pacific Oceans the net mid-latitude precipitation reaches its peak during June–August synchronously in the northern and the southern hemisphere, i.e. in different seasons.

In the North and South Atlantic Oceans and in the North Pacific Ocean evaporation exceeds precipitation in winter and spring. During summer and autumn the sign of E-P changes for all ocean basins but the South Atlantic Ocean, which is always net evaporative. When considering the Atlantic as a whole, the constant net loss of freshwater in the South Atlantic Ocean determines the sign of the total freshwater flux and cancels the net precipitation from the North Atlantic in summer out. This means, the Atlantic in total is net-evaporative during the whole year due to the prominent influence of the South Atlantic Ocean. The opposite can be stated about the Pacific Ocean as a whole, which shows an excess of precipitation over evaporation for every season. This pattern of evaporation minus precipitation is consistent with the observed higher salinity in the Atlantic compared to the Pacific Ocean. In the Indian Ocean a net evaporation rules most of the year, except during December–February.

==== Changes due to climate change ====
===== Past =====
The report from Working Group 1 in the IPCC 2021 AR6 concluded that patterns of evaporation minus precipitation (E-P) over the ocean have enhanced the present mean pattern of wetting and drying. In general, saline surface waters had become saltier (especially in the Atlantic Ocean) while relatively fresh surface waters had become fresher (especially in the Indian Ocean). However, AR6 assessed only low confidence in globally averaged trends in E-P over the 20th century due to observational uncertainty, with a spatial dominated by evaporation increases over the ocean. Even coarse-resolution models show that mean SST and variability in SST are sensitive to changes in flux forcing.

===== Future =====
Based on the assessment of Coupled Model Intercomparison Project 6 (CMIP6) models, AR6 concluded that it is very likely that, in the long term, global mean ocean precipitation will increase with increasing Global Surface Air Temperature. Annual mean and global mean precipitation will very likely increase by 1–3% per °C warming. Hereby, the precipitation patterns will also change and exhibit substantial regional and seasonal differences. Following the general trend 'wet-gets-wetter-dry-gets-drier', precipitation will very likely increase over high latitudes and the tropical ocean and likely increase in large parts of the monsoon regions, but likely decrease over the subtropics, including the Mediterranean, southern Africa and southwest Australia, in response to greenhouse-gas induced warming. Although these are the expected general trends there can be distinct deviations from those pattern changes on a local scale. One possible impact of the corresponding trend in ocean salinity is an altering of the Thermohaline Circulation, which is explained below.

=== Continental discharge ===
Another source of freshwater discharge into the ocean is runoff from continents, through river estuaries. The average yearly freshwater discharge from continents is estimated around $46\pm10 \%\,\mathrm{km^3/yr}$. Compared to other ocean basins, the discharge is relatively high into the western tropical Atlantic, led by the Amazon and the Orinoco river estuaries. This causes some local effects as well adjustment to the large scale thermohaline circulation, as discussed in the "Influence on the Thermohaline Circulation" chapter.

==== Seasonal cycles ====
Most rivers exhibit some sort of seasonal cycle in their discharge, often (but not always) related to seasonal variation in the precipitation. The figure on the right shows the seasonal cycle of the runoff from the 10 largest rivers (Amazon, Mississippi, Congo, Yenisey, Paraná, Orinoco, Lena, Changjiang, Mekong, Brahmaputra/Gange), compared with the local precipitation cycle and two different P-E estimates. In several rivers, the runoff peak follows the precipitation peak, with different delays reflecting the time needed for the surface runoff to travel to the river mouth. For shorter rivers such as Changjiang, Mekong and Brahmaputra/Gange, the lag between the precipitation and the runoff peaks is about a month or less, while in the Amazon and the Orinoco rivers, the lag is of 2 or more months.

Other larger rivers at higher latitude, such as the Yenisey, Lena and Mississippi, seem to experience a runoff cycle decoupled from the precipitation cycle. The sharp June peak of the Lena and Yesiney cycle is likely due to snowmelt, as well as the less prominent peak between March and May in the Mississippi river.

The Panama and the Congo river do not experience significant seasonal runoff cycles, despite the precipitation cycles, this is probably due to human intervention through river damming.

==== Multi-annual cycles and climate change impacts ====
River runoff is also affected by other meteorological cycles that span over several years.

In particular, a significant correlation with El Niño-Southern Oscillation (ENSO) phase and strength has been observed for several major rivers, as well as a correlation with Interdecadal Pacific Oscillation (IPO).

These irregular cycles, and other possible factors of internal variation which are yet to be researched fully, make it difficult to identify the changes in river runoff that can be ascribed to human induced climate change.

However, climate simulations under a moderate emission scenario (RCP4.5) show significant changes in river runoff by the end of the century, with decreased runoff in Central America, Mexico, the Mediterranean Basin, Southern Africa and much of South America, and increased runoff in the rest of Eurasia and North America. These changes are consistent with the expected precipitation changes, but a component of earlier snowmelt and permafrost thawing will also have to be considered.

A 2018 study has recorded the variation in river runoff into different each oceanic basin from 1986 to 2016, showing an increased discharge into the Arctic Ocean and a decreased discharge in the Indian Ocean over the last decade.

==== Local impacts of river runoff ====
The input of freshwater from river runoff may seem negligible compared to that precipitation, but several studies have shown that its impact can't be neglected

The largest annual changes in surface salinity have been observed on the western tropical Atlantic, peaking between spring and summer, when the precipitation peak in the ITCZ coincides with the peak in the Amazon discharge. The low salinity water influx have also been shown to follow the seasonal variation of currents on the Brazil coast (northwestward in spring, eastward in summer)

As a direct consequence of the freshwater discharge, rivers have an impact on the local Sea Surface Temperature (SST). This effect is theorethically present at all river mouths, but it was possible to measure it only for very large rivers.

The freshwater placed on top of the saline water serves to stabilize the stratification, restricting the vertical mixing of colder water from higher depths, hence increasing the local SST. Simulations have shown a large SST anomaly especially close to the mouth of the Congo river between July and April, up to +1 °C; a similar anomaly has also been simulated near the mouth of the Amazon river between May and October.

River discharge also has an impact on the local sea level, through two different processes:. Those are roughly represented by the first two terms of the following equation

$\eta=P'_b/(g\rho_0)-1/\rho_0 \cdot \int\limits_{0}^{-H} \rho' dz+ P_{atm}/(g\rho_0)$

In which $\eta$ is the sea surface variation from the mean, $P'_b$ is the variation of bottom sea pressure, $\rho'$ is the variation of sea water density from the mean ($\rho_0$), and $P_{atm}$ is the atmospheric pressure at sea level.

The first term represents the simple increase of the ocean mass: the importance of this contribution can be established through "hosing experiment", which entails simulating the same water input of the river but with the same salinity as ocean water. While it has been shown that sea level increase caused by this contribution is carried away by bartropic waves in the timescale of days, it can still have an impact when the water basin is semi-enclosed (as in the Arctic) or the water input is particularly large. Durand et altr. simulated a "hosing experiment" with seasonally variable input in the Bay of Bengal, that showed sea level oscillation to the order of 0.1 m

Further, since the freshwater from the river runoff has a lower density than the seawater, the term $\rho'$ is negative across the first water layer, which results in a positive contribution to the sea level from the second term. This phenomenon is called halosteric effect. The contribution of the halosteric effect generally has a longer lasting effect compared to the ocean mass contribution, while still being in the same order of margnitude (0.1-0-2 m).

The third term of the equation represents the dependency on atmospheric pressure which is unaffected by river runoff.

=== Other oceanic freshwater fluxes ===
==== Groundwater ====
The total flux of groundwater to the ocean can be divided into three different fluxes: fresh submarine groundwater discharge, near-shore terrestrial groundwater discharge and recirculated sea water. The contribution of fresh groundwater accounts for less than 1% of the total freshwater input into the ocean and is therefore negligible on a global scale. However, due to a high variability of groundwater discharge there can be an important contribution to coastal ecosystems on a local scale.

==== Ice freezing and melting ====
Two categories of ice have to be considered in context of oceanic freshwater fluxes: sea ice and (recently) grounded ice like ice shelfs and icebergs.

Sea ice is considered as part of the oceanic water budget, therefore, its melting or freezing states not an input or output of water in general. However, at a regional scale and intraannually timescale, it can present an important determinator of ocean salinity, by adding freshwater during melting process or by rejecting salt during the freezing process. For example, over the Arctic Ocean evaporation and precipitation rates are quite low, respectively, about 5±10 cm/yr and 20±30 cm/yr in liquid water equivalent. The freshwater cycle in the Arctic Ocean is, therefore, significantly determined by freezing and melting of sea ice, for which characteristic rates are about 100 and 50 cm/yr, respectively. If the ice drifts during the long intervals between the phase changes (frozen and liquid), the result is a net local distillation, where the sea ice was formed and a net local freshening of water, where the sea ice melts. This freezing and melting of sea ice, with their accompanying salinity changes, supply local buoyancy forcing that influences ocean circulation.

The calving of a previously grounded ice sheet into the ocean as an iceberg as well as the melting of ice shelfs related to warm ocean water constitute a net freshwater influx, not only on a local but whole ocean scale. Although, the total input from the cryosphere is small compared to the total input of precipitation and riverine discharge (less than 1% on a global scale), on a local scale this can be an important contributor of freshwater and influencing ocean circulation.

== Influence on thermohaline circulation (THC) ==
The Thermohaline Circulation is part of the global ocean circulation. Although this phenomenon is not fully understood yet, it is known that its driving processes are thermohaline forcing and turbulent mixing. Thermohaline forcing refers to density-gradient driven motions, whereby density is determined by the temperature ('thermo') and salt concentration ('haline') of the water. Heat and freshwater fluxes at the ocean's surface play therefore a key role in forming ocean currents. Those currents exert a major effect on regional and global climate.

The Atlantic Meridional Overturning Circulation (AMOC) is the Atlantic branch of the THC. Hereby, northward moving surface water release heat and water to the atmosphere and gets therefore colder, more saline and consequently denser. This leads to the formation of cold deep water in the North Atlantic. This cold deep water flows back to the south a depth of 2–3 km until it joins the Antarctic Circumpolar Current.

The described differences in net precipitation-evaporation patterns between the Atlantic and the Pacific, with the Atlantic being net evaporative and the Pacific experiencing net precipitation, leads to a distinct difference in salinity contrast, with the Atlantic being more saline than the Pacific. This freshwater flux driven salinity contrast is the main reason that the Atlantic supports a meridional overturning circulation and the Pacific does not. The lower surface salinity of the North Pacific, due to high precipitation rates, inhibits deep convection in the Pacific. AR6 concluded from model simulations from the Climate Model Intercomparison Project 6 (CMIP6) that the AMOC will very likely weaken in the 21st century, but there is low confidence in the models' projected timing and magnitude of AMOC decline. The projected AMOC weakening can be explained by the CMIP6 projection of an increase in high-latitude temperature and precipitation, along with freshwater input from increased melting of the Greenland Ice Sheet, which cause high-latitude North Atlantic surface waters to become less dense and more stable, preventing overturning and weakening AMOC.

=== Impacts of river runoff on the large-scale thermohaline circulation ===
While evaporation and precipitation processes are the main cause of the salinity anomalies that drive the THC, large rivers seem to have a not negligible impact as well. In particular, a 2017 study simulated the shutdown of the Amazon runoff, and measured its impact on the AMOC. It was found that the Amazon shutdown could cause a strengthening in the AMOC, increased upwelling and lower SST in the equator and southern tropics. The cooler SST over the equator consequently could cause a reduction of the rainfall in the ITCZ, weakening of the meridional atmospheric cells and the westerlies winds in the extratropics. North America and the Arctic would then experience warmer winters (with anomalies up to 1.3 °C), while Northern Eurasia would have cooler and drier condition. In the southern hemisphere, the Amazonia region could also experience drier conditions, possibly causing a positive feedback. The paper concluded by advising caution in the building of dams over the Amazon river (more than a hundred new dams are being considered for construction in the next few decades)

In what could be seen as a small-scale case study, the damming of the Nile river in 1964 (Aswan High Dam) has been shown to have had an impact on the THC of the Mediterranean Sea. A steady increase in the surface and intermediate waters' salinity has been recorded in the West Mediterranean over the last 40 years. This is connected to a growth of the activity in the deep water formation sites in the South Adriatic. The damming of the Nile has been found to be responsible for about 40% of this salinity increase (and hence the increase in deep water formation)
