= Trevor McDougall =

Oceanographer

Professor Trevor McDougall AC FRS FAA FAGU FAMS FInstP FRSN
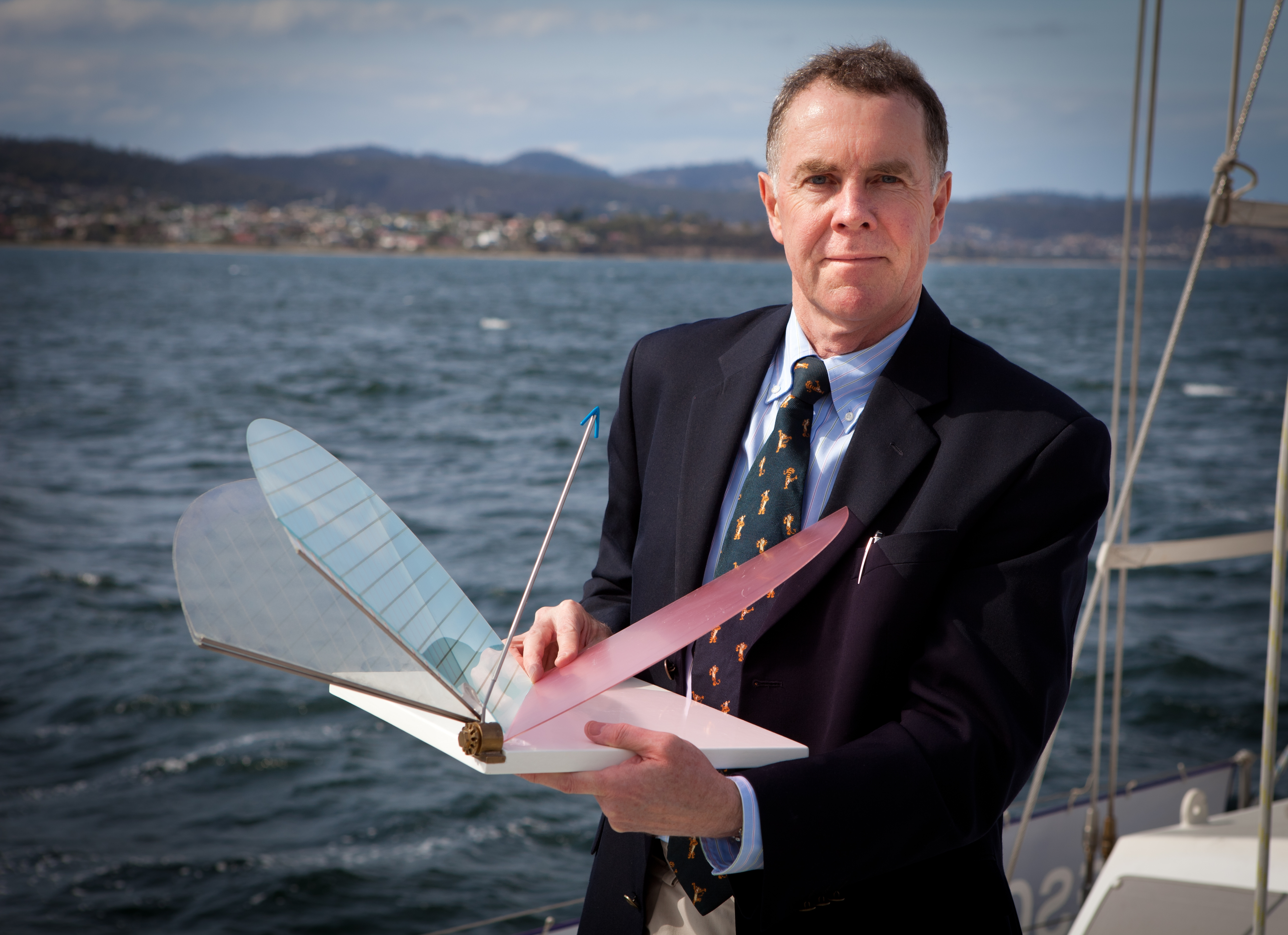
- Born: Trevor John McDougall; 1 July 1952 (age 74); Adelaide, South Australia, Australia
- Education: Unley High School
- Alma mater: University of Adelaide (BEng); University of Cambridge (PhD)
- Awards: Australian Laureate Fellowship (2015), Companion of the Order of Australia (2018), Prime Minister's Prize for Science (2022)
- Scientific career
- Fields: Applied mathematics; Physical oceanography
- Workplaces: University of New South Wales
- Doctoral advisors: Stewart Turner; Paul Linden

Trevor John McDougall is an Australian physical oceanographer specialising in ocean mixing and the thermodynamics of seawater. He is Emeritus Scientia Professor of Ocean Physics in the School of Mathematics and Statistics at the University of New South Wales, Sydney, Australia, and is past president of the International Association for the Physical Sciences of the Oceans (IAPSO) of the International Union of Geodesy and Geophysics.

== Education ==
After attending Unley High School in Adelaide, South Australia, McDougall went to St Mark's College (University of Adelaide) and graduated from the University of Adelaide in Mechanical Engineering in 1974. He obtained a Doctor of Philosophy in 1978 from the University of Cambridge and a Graduate Diploma in Economics from the Australian National University in 1982.

== Research and career ==
McDougall undertook his PhD studies in the Department of Applied Mathematics and Theoretical Physics and St John's College, Cambridge of the University of Cambridge where he was supervised by Professors Stewart Turner and Paul Linden. In 1978 he returned to Australia on a Queen's Fellowship in Marine Science at the Research School of Earth Sciences, Australian National University (ANU). After five years at ANU he was appointed to CSIRO in Hobart as a physical oceanographer. Since 2012 he has been Scientia Professor of Ocean Physics in the School of Mathematics and Statistics at the University of New South Wales, Sydney.

McDougall's research in physical oceanography has provided insight into how seawater mixes under different conditions, which is important for understanding climate change. The ocean and the atmosphere play roughly equal roles in transporting heat from the equatorial region to the poles, and McDougall's research is concerned with how the ocean reduces the equator-to-pole temperature differences, thus making Earth habitable.

McDougall is known for developing, together with David Jackett, an algorithm for defining neutral density surfaces. These are the surfaces along which swirling ocean eddies — that are 10–500 kilometres wide and persist for many months — mix. The rate of turbulent mixing in the ocean is a factor of ten million times stronger along "density" surfaces than in the direction across these surfaces. The accurate modelling of the ocean’s role in climate relies on being able to accurately define and evaluate these surfaces. McDougall has also made significant contributions to incorporating the concepts of mixing and heat into ocean models.

He was president of the International Association for the Physical Sciences of the Oceans (IAPSO) of the International Union of Geodesy and Geophysics from 2019-2023 and is past president for 2023-2027. He chaired the working group of SCOR and IAPSO that developed the international standard definitions of the thermodynamic properties of seawater, humid air, and ice (TEOS-10, Thermodynamic Equation of Seawater - 2010), which were adopted by the Intergovernmental Oceanographic Commission in 2009.

== Awards and honours ==
McDougall was elected a Fellow of the Royal Society in 2012. He is also a fellow of the Australian Academy of Science (1997), the CSIRO (2007), the Australian Meteorological and Oceanographic Society (2004), the Institute of Physics (UK) (2012), the Royal Society of New South Wales (2015), the American Geophysical Union (2018), the American Meteorological Society (2027), and the International Union of Geodesy and Geophysics (2023). He was awarded Honorary Life Membership of the European Geosciences Union in 2025. His other awards include:

- Zillman Medal, 2025, awarded by the Australian Meteorological and Oceanographic Society to a scientist who has made a substantial learned research contribution in Australia
- Alfred Wegener Medal, 2025, awarded by the European Geosciences Union, for outstanding contributions to ocean science that have fundamentally changed how we understand the ocean and its role in shaping the Earth’s climate
- 2023 NSW Scientist of the Year, awarded by the Premier of New South Wales, Australia.
- Prime Minister's Prize for Science, 2022, for his discovery of four new ocean mixing processes and his work to define the thermodynamic properties of seawater
- Prize of Excellence, Werner Petersen Foundation, Germany, 2018.
- Companion of the Order of Australia in 2018 for eminent service to science, and to education, particularly in the area of ocean thermodynamics, as an academic, and researcher, to furthering the understanding of climate science, and as a mentor of young scientists.
- New South Wales Premier's Prize for Excellence in Mathematics, Earth Sciences, Chemistry and Physics, 2017.
- John Conrad Jaeger Medal 2015, awarded by the Australian Academy of Science.
- Henry Houghton chair for visiting senior earth scientists, Massachusetts Institute of Technology, 2015
- Australian Laureate Fellowship, 2015, awarded by the Australian Research Council
- Royal Society of Tasmania Medal 2013, awarded by the Royal Society of Tasmania.
- Prince Albert I Medal, 2011, awarded by the International Association for the Physical Sciences of the Oceans (IAPSO) of the IUGG for outstanding contributions to the advancement of the physical and/or chemical sciences of the ocean.
- Anton Bruun Medal, awarded by the Intergovernmental Oceanographic Commission, 2009.
- A.G. Huntsman Award for Excellence in the Marine Sciences, presented by the Royal Society of Canada, 2005.
- Centenary Medal, 2001. For service to Australian society and science in marine science.
- M. R. Banks Medal, awarded by the Royal Society of Tasmania, 1998.
- Humboldt Prize, given by the Alexander von Humboldt Foundation, Germany, 1997.
- David Rivett Medal, awarded to a CSIRO Scientist who is less than 40 years old, 1992.
- Frederick White Prize, awarded by the Australian Academy of Science, 1988.
- J. T. Knight Prize, 1976, awarded by the University of Cambridge.
- South Australian Engineering Design Award, with Dr Garry L. Brown, awarded by Engineers Australia, 1975.
