= Melvin Stern =

American oceanographer

Melvin Ernest Stern
- Born: January 22, 1929; New York City
- Died: February 2, 2010 (aged 81); Philadelphia, Pennsylvania
- Occupation: Oceanographer

Melvin Ernest Stern (January 22, 1929 – February 2, 2010) was a U.S. academic oceanographer who focused on fluid dynamics. He served as the Ekman Professor of Oceanography at Florida State University and was an elected member of both the National Academy of Sciences and the American Academy of Arts & Sciences. Dr. Stern was the first researcher in the world to mathematically describe salt fingering, a phenomenon produced by Double diffusive convection.

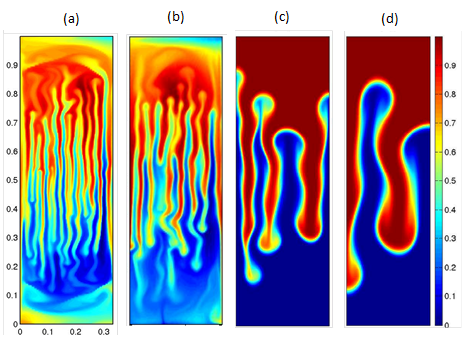
Numerical simulation of salt fingering

== Biography ==
Born January 22, 1929, and a native of New York City, Melvin received his B.E.E. degree in Electrical Engineering from Cooper Union in 1950; a M.S. in Physics from Illinois Tech in 1952; and a Ph.D. in Meteorology from M.I.T. in 1956.

He began his career at Woods Hole Oceanographic Institution as a research assistant in Physics from 1951- 1952. On military leave to serve in the Air Force from 1952-1957, he returned to WHOI in the same position from 1957- 1964. He went on to join the faculty at the Graduate School of Oceanography, University of Rhode Island in 1964 and then to Florida State University in 1987 where he was a professor for many years.

A pioneer in his field, Melvin was one of the founders of the WHOI Geophysical Fluid Dynamics (GFD) program, which he continued to attend through 2004. He returned for the program's 50th year celebration in 2008 and then again in 2009 to deliver a lecture at a special dinner for Lou Howard. He was elected to the National Academy of Sciences in 1998.

Melvin Stern died on February 2, 2010, in Philadelphia, PA. He was 81. He is survived by Astrid, his wife of 55 years, and children Darienne Stern, Amanda Stern, and Philip Stern.

== Honours, decorations, awards and distinctions ==
- National Academy of Sciences
- American Academy of Arts & Sciences

== See also ==
- Salt fingering
