= Stable and unstable stratification =

A simple model of an unstable stratification converting to a stable one (in immiscible fluids, like oil and water, or the wax and water of a lava lamp). Note Rayleigh–Taylor instability plumes (with "mushroom" heads) in both colours/directions.

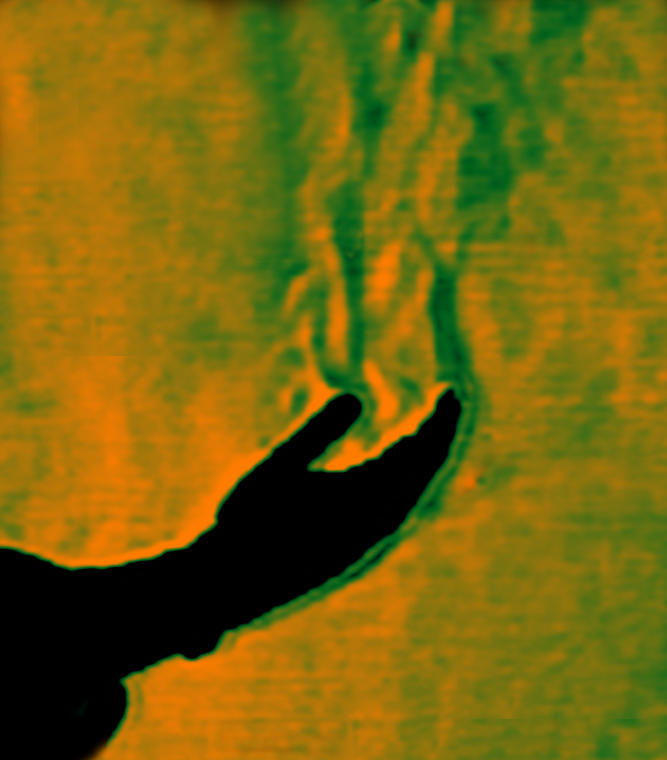
A human hand heating air. The heated air is underneath unheated air, an unstable stratification, so the hand-heated air rises and the cool air sinks, causing convection.

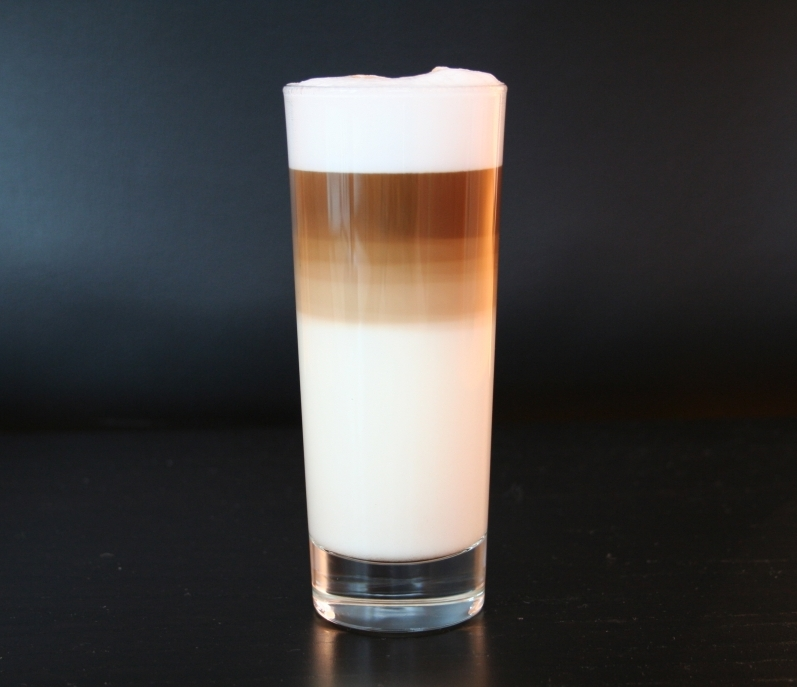
A stably-stratified beverage of cold milk, warm coffee, and cream. The least dense layer is on top. The milk and coffee are slowly mixing to form new diffusive layers, visible in intermediate shades of brown, as the milk warms and the coffee cools at the interface.

Diffusive layers may internally be homogeneously-mixed, but with each layer different from the next. This leads to stair-step profiles in physical properties (here, temperature and salinity; in the previous photo, colour).

Stable stratification of fluids occurs when each layer is less dense than the one below it. Unstable stratification is when each layer is denser than the one below it.

Buoyancy forces tend to preserve stable stratification; the higher layers float on the lower ones. In unstable stratification, on the other hand, buoyancy forces cause convection. The less-dense layers rise though the denser layers above, and the denser layers sink though the less-dense layers below. Stratifications can become more or less stable if layers change density. The processes involved are important in many science and engineering fields.

== Destablization and mixing ==
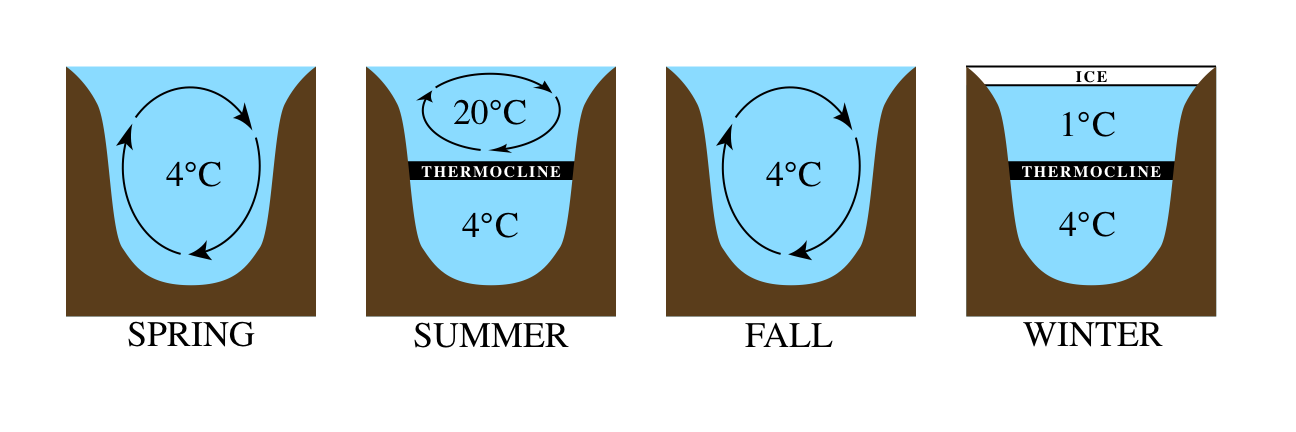
Typical mixing pattern for many lakes, caused by the fact that water is less dense at the freezing point than at 4 Celsius. Lake stratification is stable in summer and winter, becoming unstable in spring and fall when the surface waters cross the 4 Celsius mark.

Stable stratifications can become unstable if layers change density. This can happen due to outside influences (for instance, if water evaporates from a freshwater lens, making it saltier and denser, or if a pot or layered beverage is heated from below, making the bottom layer less dense). However, it can also happen due to internal diffusion of heat (the warmer layer slowly heats the adjacent cooler one) or other physical properties. This often causes mixing at the interface, creating new diffusive layers (see photo of coffee and milk).

Sometimes, two physical properties diffuse between layers simultaneously; salt and temperature, for instance. This may form diffusive layers or even salt fingering, when the surfaces of the diffusive layers become so wavy that there are "fingers" of layers reaching up and down.

Not all mixing is driven by density changes. Other physical forces may also mix stably-stratified layers. Sea spray and whitecaps (foaming whitewater on waves) are examples of water mixed into air, and air into water, respectively. In a fierce storm the air/water boundary may grow indistinct. Some of these wind waves are Kelvin-Helmholtz waves.

Depending on the size of the velocity difference and the size of the density contrast between the layers, Kelvin-Helmholtz waves can look different. For instance, between two layers of air or two layers of water, the density difference is much smaller and the layers are miscible; see black-and-white model video.

== Applications ==
=== Planetary science ===
When two stably-stratified layers are moving relative to one another, Kelvin-Helmholtz waves may form at the interface. These patterns are also seen on other planets.

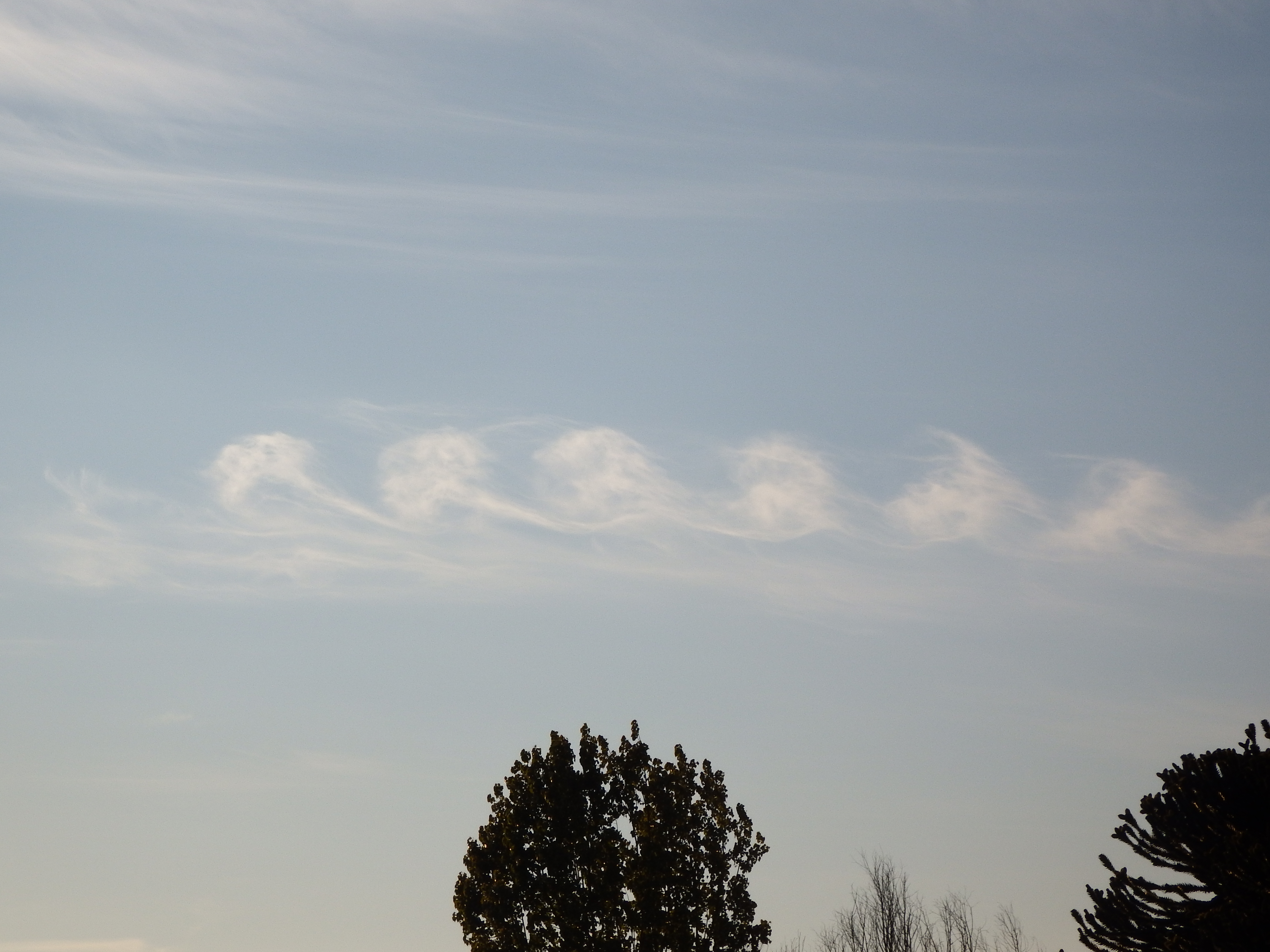
These clouds trace the Kelvin-Helmholtz waves between two thermally-stratified layers of the atmosphere.

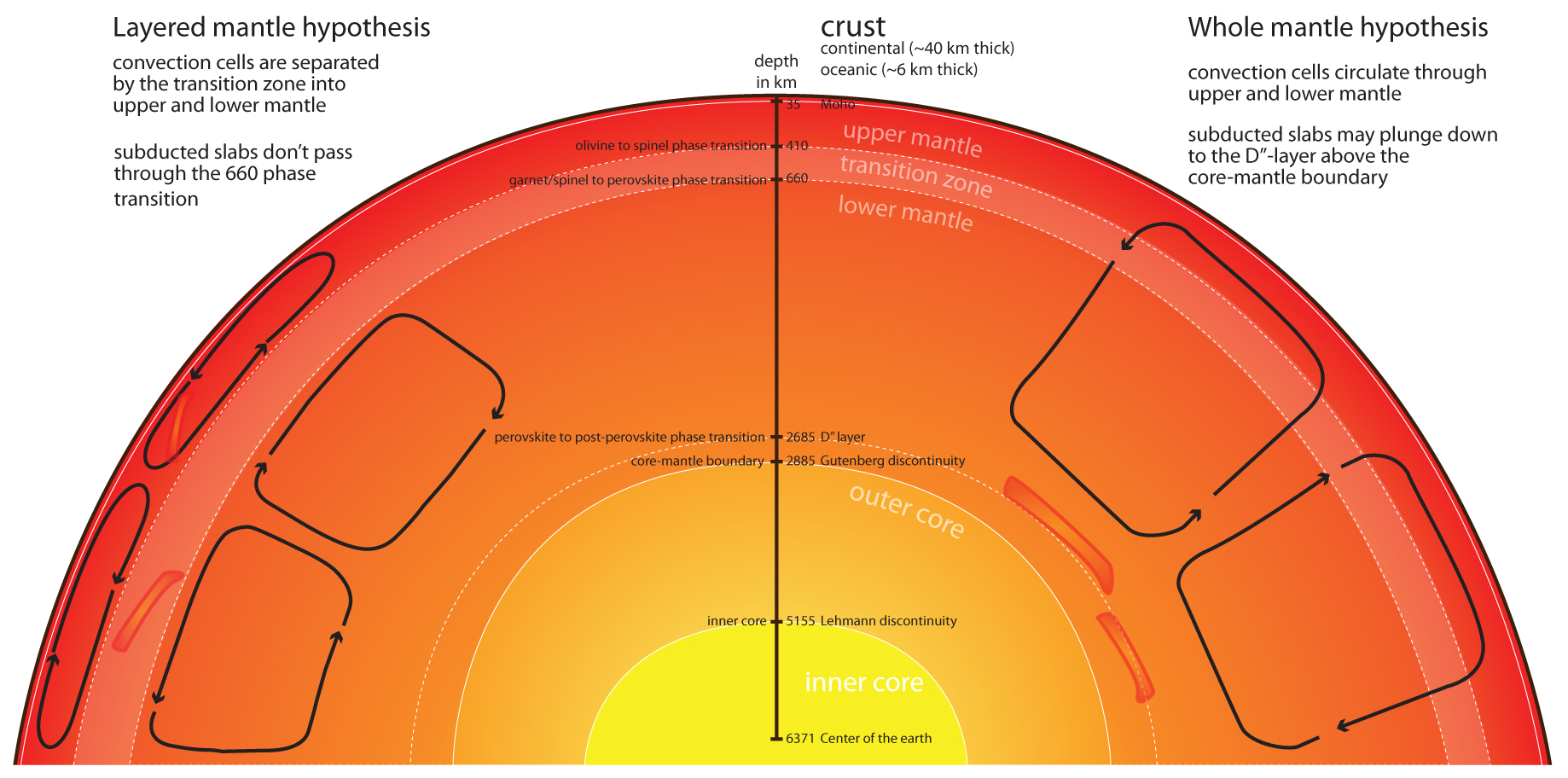
Earth's lithosphere includes upwards heat flow, partial convection, and a metal-layer core.

Stratification is commonly seen in the planetary sciences.

Solar energy passes as visible radiation through the air, and is absorbed by the ground, to be re-emitted as heat radiation. The lower atmosphere is therefore heated from below (UV absorption in the ozone layer heats that layer from within). Outdoor air is thus usually unstably stratified and convecting, giving us wind. Temperature inversions are a weather event which happens whenever an area of the lower atmosphere becomes stably-stratified and thus stops moving.

Oceans, on the other hand, are heated from above, and are usually stably stratified. Only near the poles does the coldest and saltiest water sink. The deep ocean waters slowly warm and freshen through internal mixing (a form of double diffusion), and then rise back to the surface.

Examples:

- Stratification (water)
  - Ocean stratification, the formation of water layers based on temperature and salinity in oceans
  - Lake stratification, the formation of water layers based on temperature, with mixing in the spring and fall in seasonal climates.
- Atmospheric instability
- Atmospheric stratification, the dividing of the upper reaches of the Earth's atmosphere into stably-stratified layers
- Atmospheric circulation, caused by the unstable stratification of the atmosphere
- Thermohaline circulation, circulation in the oceans despite stable stratification.
- Stratified flows (such as the flow through the Straits of Gibraltar)

=== Engineering ===
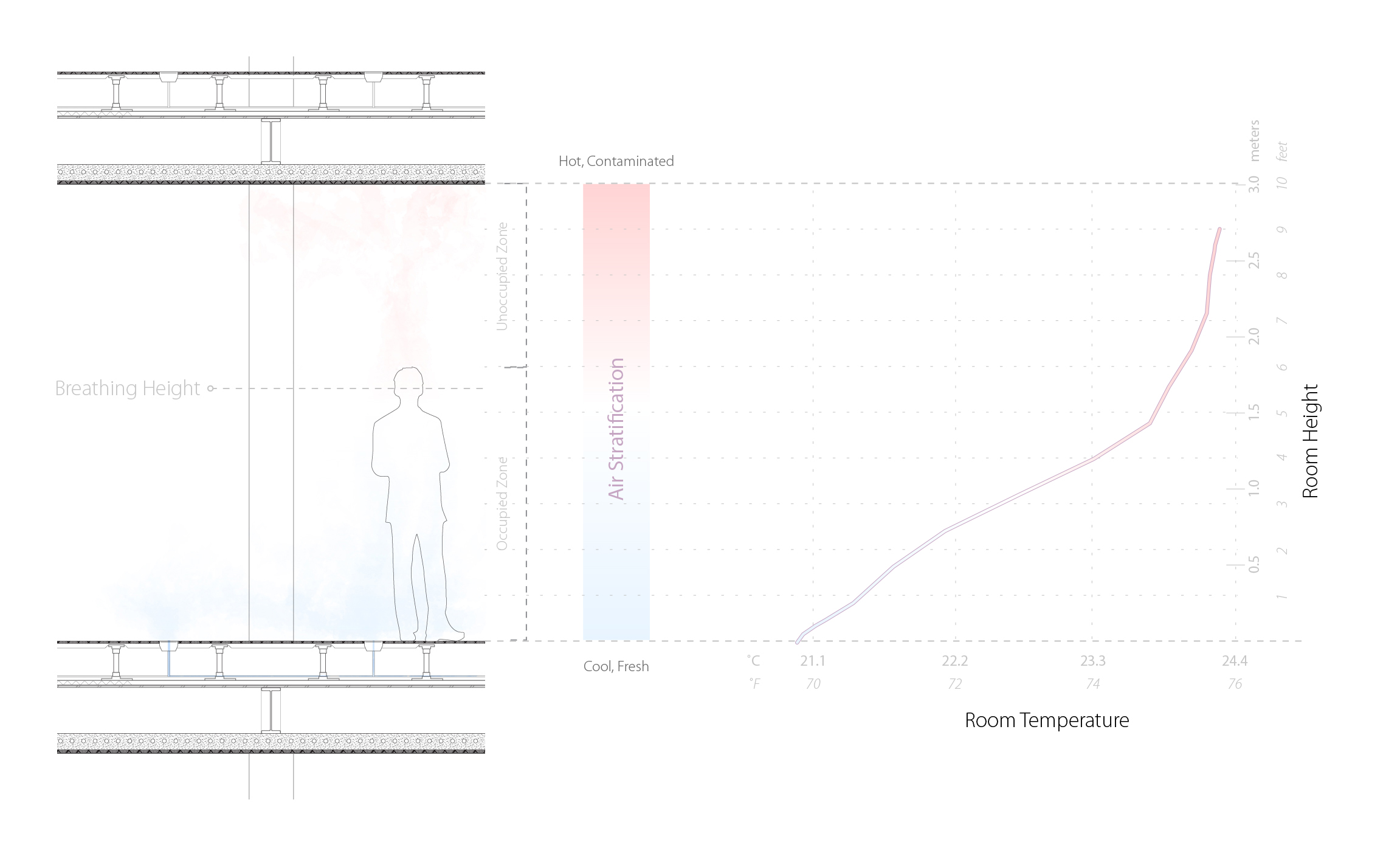
Vertical temperature gradient cause by stable stratification of air inside a room. Note hot air rising convectively from the person; bodyheat temporarily disrupts the stable stratification.

In engineering applications, stable stratification or convection may or may not be desirable. In either case it may be deliberately manipulated. Stratification can strongly affect the mixing of fluids, which is important in many manufacturing processes.

- Underfloor heating deliberately creates unstable stratification of the air in a room.
- Passive cooling relies on selectively encouraging and disrupting stable stratification to cool rooms.
