= Paul Linden =

British mathematician

- Born: Paul Frederick Linden; 29 January 1947 (age 79)
- Education: University of Adelaide (BSc); Flinders University (MSc); University of Cambridge (PhD)
- Awards: FRS (2007)
- Scientific career
- Fields: Fluid dynamics
- Workplaces: University of California, San Diego; University of Cambridge
- Thesis: The Effect of Turbulence and Shear on Salt Fingers (1972)
- Doctoral advisor: Stewart Turner
- Doctoral students: Claudia Cenedese
- Website: http://www.damtp.cam.ac.uk/user/pfl4

Paul Frederick Linden (born 29 January 1947) is a British mathematician specialising in fluid dynamics. He was the third G. I. Taylor Professor of Fluid Mechanics at the University of Cambridge, inaugural Blasker Distinguished Professor Emeritus of Environmental Science and Engineering at the UC San Diego and a fellow of Downing College.

== Education ==
Linden earned his PhD from the University of Cambridge in 1972, under the supervision of Stewart Turner. His thesis was entitled The Effect of Turbulence and Shear on Salt Fingers.

== Awards and honours ==
He was elected a Fellow of the American Physical Society in 2003.

Linden was elected a Fellow of the Royal Society (FRS) in 2007. His certificate of election reads:

Linden is world renowned for his laboratory experiments and theoretical analyses of fluid flows relevant to oceanography, meteorology and environmental and industrial problems. He has demonstrated great skill and originality in isolating the basic physical processes underlying a diverse range phenomena. His studies of double-diffusive convective processes have shown how they influence the development of density structures in the ocean. His research on stably stratified turbulence has illuminated the mixing mechanisms at density interfaces, and the unifying concept of mixing efficiency which he introduced is now widely used to characterise stratified turbulence. He has also investigated instabilities of fronts and vortices in rotating, stratified flows and has shown how these lead to the formation of stable vortex dipoles. Linden's work on gravity-driven flows has led to a better understanding of the formation of fronts in the atmosphere and ocean, and it also has industrial applications. He has pioneered the current approach to modelling natural ventilation flows in complex buildings. His concepts have already been used on a number of prestigious projects, including the novel New York Times building. Linden has played a crucial role in stimulating the development of innovative imaging and measuring techniques which have had an important influence on experimental fluid dynamics worldwide.
