= Claudia Cenedese =

Italian oceanographer

Claudia Cenedese (born 1971) is an Italian physical oceanographer and applied mathematician whose research focuses on the circulation and flow of water in the ocean, and on the theoretical fluid dynamics needed to model these flows, including phenomena such as mesoscale vortices, buoyancy-driven flow, coastal currents, dense overflows, and the melting patterns of icebergs. She is a senior scientist at the Woods Hole Oceanographic Institution.

== Education and career ==
Cenedese's father, Antonio Cenedese, is also a fluid dynamics researcher at Sapienza University of Rome, and as a child, she became fascinated by the motion of water in his experimental tanks. She earned a laurea in environmental engineering from Sapienza University in 1995, and completed a Ph.D. in applied mathematics and theoretical physics at the University of Cambridge in 1998, under the supervision of Paul Linden.

She came to the Woods Hole Oceanographic Institution in 1998 as a postdoctoral scholar working with John A. Whitehead. She remained there for the rest of her career, becoming an assistant scientist in 2000 and obtaining a permanent research staff position in 2004. She was promoted to senior scientist in 2015. At Woods Hole, she established an exchange program for Italian students to visit, and has been active in mentoring women in oceanography.

Since 2015, she has also held an adjunct faculty position in the Department of Civil and Natural Resources Engineering of the University of Canterbury in New Zealand.

== Recognition ==
In 2018, Cenedese was elected as a Fellow of the American Physical Society (APS), after a nomination from the APS Division of Fluid Dynamics, "for fundamental contributions to the understanding of fluid-dynamical processes in the world's oceans, particularly turbulent entrainment into overflows and the melting of glaciers and icebergs, obtained through elegant and physically insightful laboratory experiments".
