= Density ratio =

Measure used in calculating seawater density gradient

The density ratio of a column of seawater is a measure of the relative contributions of temperature and salinity in determining the density gradient. At a density ratio of 1, temperature and salinity are said to be compensated: their density signatures cancel, leaving a density gradient of zero. The formula for the density ratio, $R_\rho$, is:

$$R_\rho= \frac{\alpha d\theta/dz}{\beta dS/dz}$$

where

- θ is the potential temperature
- S is the salinity
- z is the vertical coordinate (with subscript denoting differentiation by z)
- ρ is the density
- α = −ρ^{−1}∂ρ/∂θ is the thermal expansion coefficient
- β = ρ^{−1}∂ρ/∂S is the haline contraction coefficient

When a water column is "doubly stable"—both temperature and salinity contribute to the stable density gradient—the density ratio is negative (a doubly unstable water column would also have a negative density ratio but does not commonly occur). When either the temperature- or salinity-induced stratification is statically unstable, while the overall density stratification is statically stable, double-diffusive instability exists in the water column. Double-diffusive instability can be separated into two different regimes of statically stable density stratification: a salt fingering regime (warm salty overlying cool fresh) when the density ratio is greater than 1, and a diffusive convection regime (cool fresh overlying warm salty) when the density ratio is between 0 and 1.

Density ratio may also be used to describe thermohaline variability over a non-vertical spatial interval, such as across a front in the mixed layer.

== Diffusive density ratio ==
In place of the density ratio, sometimes the diffusive density ratio $R_\rho^*$ is used, which is defined as

$$R_\rho^*=\frac{1}{R_{\rho}}= \frac{\beta dS/dz}{\alpha d\theta/dz}$$

== Turner Angle ==
If the signs of both the numerator and denominator are reversed, the density ratio remains unchanged. A related quantity which avoids this ambiguity as well as the infinite values possible when the denominator vanishes is the Turner angle, $Tu$, which was introduced by Barry Ruddick and named after Stewart Turner. It is defined by

$$Tu = \frac{3\pi}{4}-\mathrm{arg}\left(\beta \frac{dS}{dz}+i\alpha \frac{d\theta}{dz}\right).$$

The Turner angle is related to the density ratio by

$$R_\rho =- \tan\left(Tu +\frac{\pi}{4}\right).$$

== See also ==
- Spice (oceanography)
- Double diffusive convection
