= Stewart Turner =

Australian geophysicist (1930–2022)

John Stewart Turner
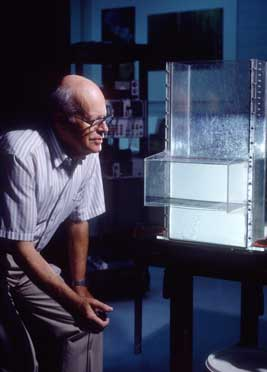
- Stewart Turner in his laboratory
- Born: 11 January 1930
- Died: 3 July 2022 (aged 92)
- Education: University of Sydney; University of Cambridge
- Known for: Turner angle
- Scientific career
- Workplaces: University of Cambridge; University of Manchester; Woods Hole Oceanographic Institution; CSIRO; Australian National University
- Thesis: Dynamical aspects of cloud physics (1956)
- Doctoral advisor: G. I. Taylor
- Doctoral students: Paul Linden; Trevor McDougall

John Stewart Turner, FAA, FRS (11 January 1930 – 3 July 2022) was an Australian geophysicist.

== Early life ==
Stewart Turner was educated at North Sydney Boys High School and Sydney University. He then joined the Cloud Physics Group, CSIRO Division of Radiophysics as a Research Officer. He was awarded the 1851 Exhibition Scholarship to University of Cambridge.

== Cambridge ==
Turner completed his PhD thesis at Cambridge University in 1956 under the supervision of Sir G.I. Taylor. His thesis title was "Dynamical aspects of cloud physics". A section of this work on cloud formation contributed to the 2nd paper in the first issue of The Journal of Fluid Mechanics His contemporaries in the laboratory included Owen Philips, Harold Grant and Philip Saffman.

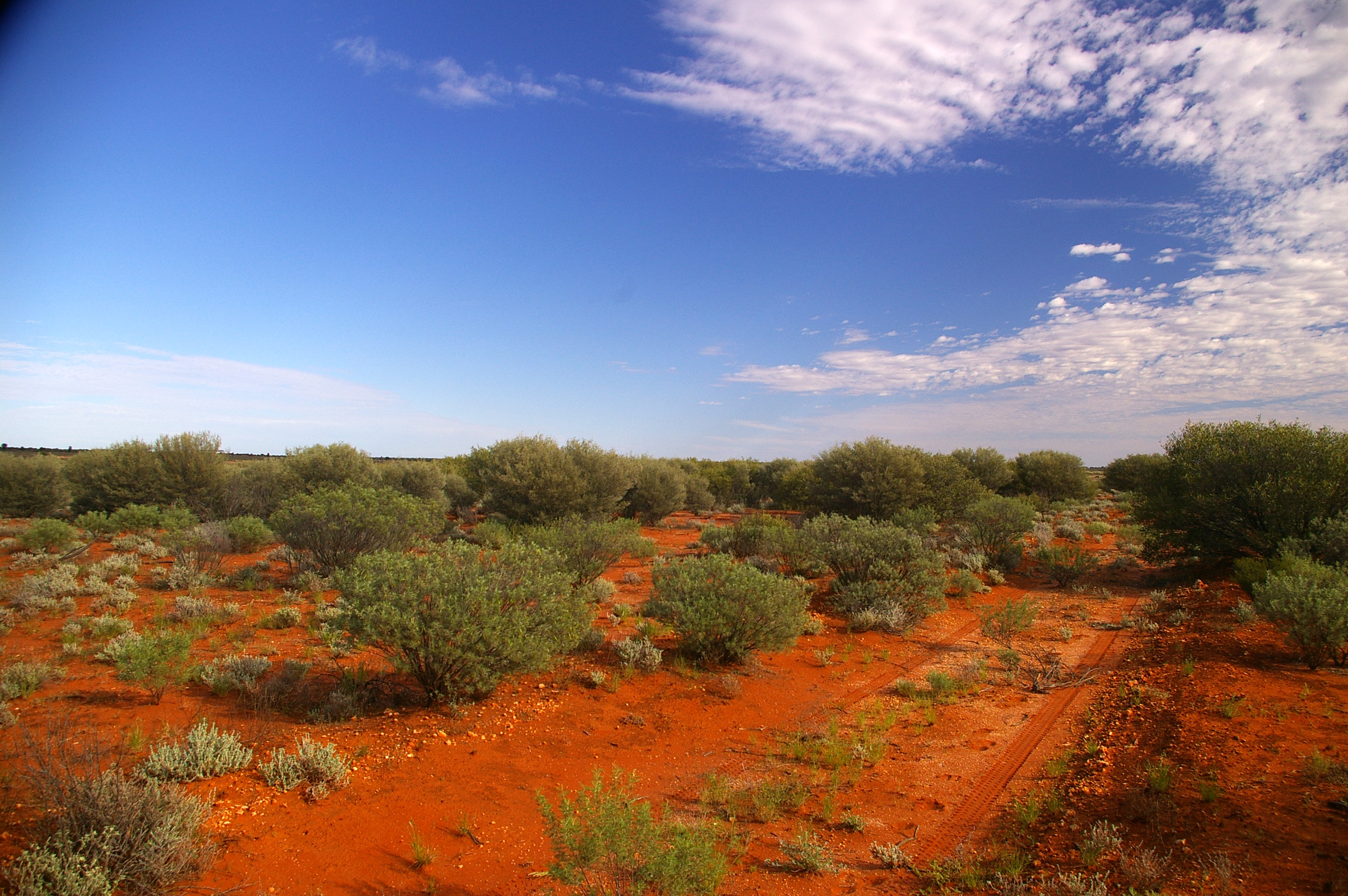
Landscape at former British nuclear test site, Maralinga, South Australia

The work on cloud formation had application to clouds formed by nuclear explosion clouds. This work was contemporary with the Maralinga tests being carried out in Australia. Analysis by the Atomic Weapons Research Establishment on cloud formation had proved inadequate as their predictions of the height to which the clouds had extended in the South Australian explosions were too small by a factor of over two. Turner and colleagues experiments and theory provided an improved explanation.

Another piece of work from this time involved collaboration with Bruce Morton, a student of George Batchelor's, on convection forced by a buoyancy source. This became the much cited Morton, Taylor and Turner result.

== University of Manchester ==
Turner was employed for a time (1958-1959) in the Department of the Mechanics of Fluids at the University of Manchester on a project seeking to understand the mixing of methane in coal mines. This well-known problem issue results in explosive disasters in mines around the world and was historically referred to as firedamp. The work developed laboratory experiments, using salt water and fresh water, on the mixing of wall layers into a surrounding flow. The results showed that, counter to the established practice which was to try and ventilate mines in accordance with gravity, the most effective way of getting rid of the layers was to ventilate downhill. This was because the resulting more vigorous mixing reduced methane concentrations beneath critical levels very rapidly. Within a year the recommendations were enacted through in the mining regulations in Britain.

== CSIRO ==
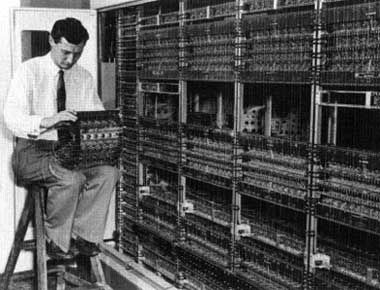
Peter Aplin of the University of Sydney works on a component of the SILLIAC computer (unknown date; early 1950s)

Turner returned to Australia and joined the Cloud Physics group in Sydney. The work at this time involved development of results using SILLIAC an early computer operated by the University of Sydney from 1956-1968 and one of the few times Turner worked directly with numerical tools. While working at CSIRO he was given the opportunity for a short-term Rossby Fellowship to work at the Woods Hole Oceanographic Institute in the USA.

== Woods Hole Oceanographic Institute ==
The 1962 shift to the Woods Hole Oceanographic Institute enabled him to work on problems primarily focusing on double diffusion. This was inspired by discussions with Henry Stommel who was interested in how differing rates of molecular diffusivity could drive turbulence convection and mixing. The period saw Turner branch out getting involved in rotating experiments on vortices and he even availed himself of an opportunity to descend into the ocean onboard the submersible DSV Alvin. After finishing his tenure at WHOI he would regularly return to work on problems and participate in their Geophysical Fluid Dynamics Summer School.

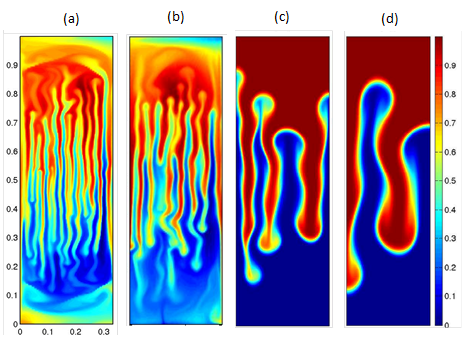
Computational modelling of salt fingers

== Return to DAMTP ==
Turner returned to Cambridge in 1966 when he was offered a position at the Department of Applied Mathematics and Theoretical Physics, University of Cambridge. It was unusual to have a laboratory in a mathematics department, despite this the laboratory maintained a significant profile internationally. Work at this time explored further facets of salt fingering including a study that appeared in Nature with the New Zealander, Tim Shirtcliffe.

== 1973 monograph ==
In 1969 Turner published a review article on buoyant plumes which appeared in the first volume of the Annual Reviews of Fluid Mechanics. Based on this he was invited to produce a monograph. This appeared as the 1973 text "Buoyancy Effects in Fluids" (with a 1979 paperback edition) that brought together the developments in the field including his own seminal work on plumes, gravity currents entrainment in density stratified shear flows, double diffusive convection mixed layer dynamics in the ocean and the dynamics of ventilated flows. Much of his work used laboratory experiment to understand the basic physics and associated scaling relationships.

== Australian National University ==
In 1975 he returned to Australia to become the Foundation Professor of Geophysical Fluid Dynamics, Research School of Earth Sciences, Australian National University in Canberra. As Foundation Professor of Geophysical Fluid Dynamics Turner was able to set up a new geophysical fluid dynamics group. Research problems at this time included crystal formation and seafloor convection.

== Emeritus work ==
Turner retired in 1996, although remained active as an emeritus professor and visiting fellow at the Australian National University for many years. It was only after his retirement that the laboratory was housed in a purpose-built space. Turner's fundamental research of stratified fluid dynamics has made a significant impact on the fields of physical oceanography, limnology and civil engineering. Some examples of his videos of double diffusive laboratory experiments are available on YouTube.

In 2010 he was made the Inaugural Fellow, Australian Fluid Mechanics Society recognising his role as one of the nation's preeminent geophysical scientists. His doctoral students include Paul Linden, Trevor McDougall, Peter Baines, Peter Manins, Ross Griffiths.

== Death ==
Turner died on 3 July 2022, at the age of 92.

== Awards ==
- 1958 - Fellow, Royal Meteorological Society
- 1969 - Fellow, Institute of Physics
- 1979 - Australian Academy of Science
- 1980 - Fellow, Australian Institute of Physics
- 1982 - Fellow, Royal Society, London
- 1990 - Matthew Flinders Medal and Lecture
- 2001 - Centenary Medal for service to Australian society and earth sciences
- 2010 - Inaugural Fellow, Australian Fluid Mechanics Society
