= Haline contraction coefficient =

The Haline contraction coefficient, abbreviated as β, is a coefficient that describes the change in ocean density due to a salinity change, while the potential temperature and the pressure are kept constant. It is a parameter in the Equation Of State (EOS) of the ocean. β is also described as the saline contraction coefficient and is measured in [kg]/[g] in the EOS that describes the ocean. An example is TEOS-10. This is the thermodynamic equation of state.

β is the salinity variant of the thermal expansion coefficient α, where the density changes due to a change in temperature instead of salinity. With these two coefficients, the density ratio can be calculated. This determines the contribution of the temperature and salinity to the density of a water parcel.

β is called a contraction coefficient, because when salinity increases, water becomes denser, and if the temperature increases, water becomes less dense.

== Definition ==
The haline contraction coefficient is defined as:

$\beta = \frac{1}{\rho} \frac{\partial \rho}{\partial S_A}\Bigg |_{\Theta,p}$

where ρ is the density of a water parcel in the ocean and S$_A$ is the absolute salinity. The subscripts Θ and p indicate that β is defined at constant potential temperature Θ and constant pressure p. The haline contraction coefficient is constant when a water parcel moves adiabatically along the isobars.

== Application ==
The amount that density is influenced by a change in salinity or temperature can be computed from the density formula that is derived from the thermal wind balance.

$\rho = \rho_0 \left( -\alpha \Theta + \beta S_A \right)$

The Brunt–Väisälä frequency can also be defined when β is known, in combination with α, Θ and S$_A$. This frequency is a measure of the stratification of a fluid column and is defined over depth as:

$N^2 = g \left( \alpha \frac{\partial \Theta}{\partial z} - \beta \frac{\partial S_A}{\partial z} \right)$.

The direction of the mixing and whether the mixing is temperature- or salinity-driven can be determined from the density difference and the Brunt-Väisälä frequency.

== Computation ==
β can be computed when the conserved temperature, the absolute salinity and the pressure are known from a water parcel. Python offers the Gibbs SeaWater (GSW) oceanographic toolbox. It contains coupled non-linear equations that are derived from the Gibbs function. These equations are formulated in the equation of state of seawater, also called the equation of seawater. This equation relates the thermodynamic properties of the ocean (density, temperature, salinity and pressure). These equations are based on empirical thermodynamic properties. This means that the properties of the ocean can be computed from other thermodynamic properties. The difference between the EOS and TEOS-10 is that in TEOS-10, salinity is stated as absolute salinity, while in the previous EOS version salinity was stated as conductivity-based salinity. The absolute salinity is based on density, where it uses the mass off all non-H_{2}O molecules. Conductivity-based salinity is calculated directly from conductivity measurements taken by (for example) buoys.

The GSW beta(SA,CT,p) function can calculate β when the absolute salinity (SA), conserved temperature (CT) and the pressure are known. The conserved temperature cannot be obtained directly from assimilation data bases like GODAS. But these variables can be calculated with GSW.

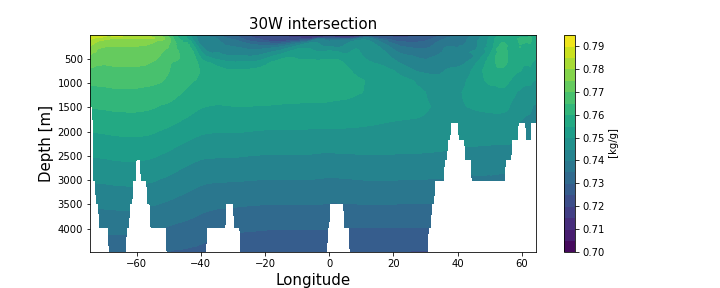
This is the 2020 average for the haline contraction coefficient β (multiplied by 1000 - the units in the figure are incorrect). At the locations where the salinity is high, in the tropics, the haline contraction coefficient is low and where the salinity is low, the haline contraction coefficient is high. This means that changing the salinity will have a large effect on the density when the haline contraction coefficient is high.

=== Physical examples ===
β is not a constant, it mostly changes with latitude and depth. At locations where salinity is high, as in the tropics, β is low and where salinity is low, β is high. A high β means that the increase in density is more than when β is low.

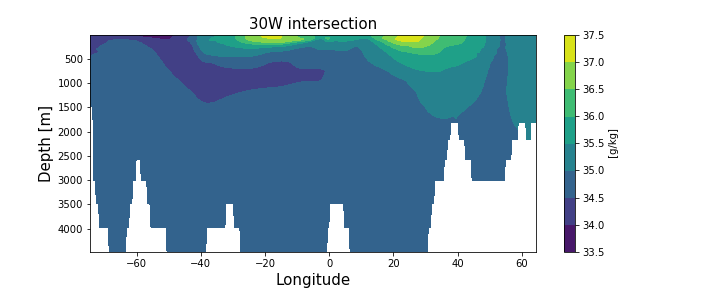
This graph shows the 2020 average salinity in an intersection in the Atlantic ocean at 30W. The salinity is low near Antarctica and high in the tropics.

The effect of β is shown in the figures. Near Antarctica, ocean salinity is low. This is because meltwater that runs off Antarctica dilutes the ocean. This water is dense, because it is cold. β around Antarctica is relatively high. Near Antarctica, temperature is the main contributor for the high density there. Water near the tropics already has high salinity. Evaporation leaves salt behind in the water, increasing salinity and therefore density. As water temperatures are a lot higher, density in the tropics is lower than around the poles. In the tropics, salinity is the main contributor to density.
