= Potential density =

The potential density of a fluid parcel at pressure $P$ is the density that the parcel would acquire if adiabatically brought to a reference pressure $P_{0}$, often 1 bar (100 kPa). Whereas density changes with changing pressure, potential density of a fluid parcel is conserved as the pressure experienced by the parcel changes (provided no mixing with other parcels or net heat flux occurs). The concept is used in oceanography and (to a lesser extent) atmospheric science.

Potential density is a dynamically important property: for static stability potential density must decrease upward. If it doesn't, a fluid parcel displaced upward finds itself lighter than its neighbors, and continues to move upward; similarly, a fluid parcel displaced downward would be heavier than its neighbors. This is true even if the density of the fluid decreases upward. In stable conditions (potential density decreasing upward) motion along surfaces of constant potential density (isopycnals) is energetically favored over flow across these surfaces (diapycnal flow), so most of the motion within a 3-D geophysical fluid takes place along these 2-D surfaces.

In oceanography, the symbol $\rho_\theta$ is used to denote potential density, with the reference pressure $P_0$ taken to be the pressure at the ocean surface. The corresponding potential density anomaly is denoted by $\sigma_\theta = \rho_\theta - 1000$ kg/m^{3}. Because the compressibility of seawater varies with salinity and temperature, the reference pressure must be chosen to be near the actual pressure to keep the definition of potential density dynamically meaningful. Reference pressures are often chosen as a whole multiple of 100 bar; for water near a pressure of 400 bar (40 MPa), say, the reference pressure 400 bar would be used, and the potential density anomaly symbol would be written $\sigma_4$. Surfaces of constant potential density (relative to and in the vicinity of a given reference pressure) are used in the analyses of ocean data and to construct models of ocean currents. Neutral density surfaces, defined using another variable called neutral density ($\gamma^n$), can be considered the continuous analog of these potential density surfaces.

Potential density adjusts for the effect of compression in two ways:

- The effect of a parcel's change in volume due to a change in pressure (as pressure increases, volume decreases).
- The effect of the parcel's change in temperature due to adiabatic change in pressure (as pressure increases, temperature increases).

A parcel's density may be calculated from an equation of state: $\rho = \rho(P,T,S_1,S_2,...)$ where $T$ is temperature, $P$ is pressure, and $S_n$ are other tracers that affect density (e.g. salinity of seawater). The potential density would then be calculated as: $\rho_\theta = \rho(P_0,\theta,S_1,S_2,...)$ where $\theta$ is the potential temperature of the fluid parcel for the same reference pressure $P_0$.

== See also ==
- Potential energy
