= Salt fingering =

Mixing process of warm, salty water with colder, fresher water

Salt fingering is a mixing process, example of double diffusive instability, that occurs when relatively warm, salty water overlies relatively colder, fresher water. It is driven by the fact that heat diffuses in water more readily than salt. A small parcel of warm, salty water sinking downwards into a colder, fresher region will lose its heat before losing its salt, making the parcel of water increasingly denser than the water around it and sinking further. Likewise, a small parcel of colder, fresher water will be displaced upwards and gain heat by diffusion from surrounding water, which will then make it lighter than the surrounding waters, and cause it to rise further. Paradoxically, the fact that salinity diffuses less readily than temperature means that salinity mixes more efficiently than temperature due to the turbulence caused by salt fingers.

Salt fingering was first described mathematically by Professor Melvin Stern of Florida State University in 1960, and important field measurements of the process have been made by Raymond Schmitt of the Woods Hole Oceanographic Institution and Mike Gregg and Eric Kunze of the University of Washington, Seattle. Salt fingering can lead to an interesting phenomenon called thermohaline staircases in which a "staircase" of well-mixed layers that are a few metres thick extend for hundreds of kilometres. One example of these can be found in the Caribbean Sea.

Pre-dating the work of Stern, a paper by the American oceanographer Henry Stommel discussed the creation of a large-scale salt finger in which a column of water would be surrounded by a membrane that would allow diffusion of temperature but not salinity. Once primed by the upward movement of the colder and fresher intermediate water, the resultant "perpetual salt fountain" would be able to draw energy (heat) from the local ocean-water stratification.
