= Double diffusive convection =

Convection with two density gradients

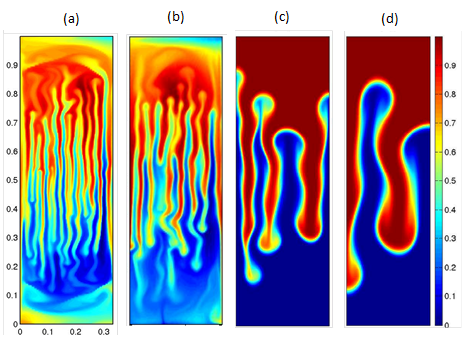
Numerical simulations results show concentration fields at different Rayleigh numbers for fixed value of R_{ρ} = 6. The parameters are: (a) Ra_{T} = 7×10^{8}, t = 1.12×10^{−2}, (b) Ra_{T} = 3.5×10^{8}, t = 1.12×10^{−2}, (c) Ra_{T} = 7×10^{6}, t = 1.31×10^{−2}, (d) Ra_{T} = 7×10^{5}, t = 3.69×10^{−2}. It is seen from the figure that finger characteristics such as width, evolution pattern are a function of Rayleigh numbers.

Double diffusive convection is a fluid-dynamical phenomenon that describes a form of convection driven by two different density gradients, which have different rates of diffusion.

Convection in fluids is driven by density variations within them under the influence of gravity. These density variations may be caused by gradients in the composition of the fluid, or by differences in temperature (through thermal expansion). Thermal and compositional gradients can often diffuse with time, reducing their ability to drive the convection, and requiring that gradients in other regions of the flow exist in order for convection to continue. A common example of double diffusive convection is in oceanography, where heat and salt concentrations exist with different gradients and diffuse at differing rates. An effect that affects both of these variables is the input of cold freshwater from an iceberg. Another example of double diffusion is the formation of false bottoms at the interface of sea ice and under-ice meltwater layers. A good discussion of many of these processes is in Stewart Turner's monograph "Buoyancy effects in fluids".

Double diffusive convection is important in understanding the evolution of a number of systems that have multiple causes for density variations. These include convection in the Earth's oceans (as mentioned above), in magma chambers, and in stars such as the Sun (where heat and helium diffuse at differing rates). Sediment can also be thought as having a slow Brownian diffusion rate compared to salt or heat, so double diffusive convection is thought to be important below sediment-laden rivers in lakes and the ocean.

Two quite different types of fluid motion exist—and therefore are classified accordingly—depending on whether the stable stratification is provided by the density-affecting component with the lower or the higher molecular diffusivity. If the stratification is provided by the component with the lower molecular diffusivity (for example, in case of a stable salt-stratified ocean perturbed by a thermal gradient due to an iceberg—a density ratio between 0 and 1), the stratification is called to be of "diffusive" type (see external link below); otherwise, it is of "finger" type, occurring frequently in oceanographic studies as salt fingers. These long fingers of rising and sinking water occur when hot saline water lies over cold fresh water of a higher density. A perturbation to the surface of hot salty water results in an element of hot salty water surrounded by cold fresh water. This element loses its heat more rapidly than its salinity because the diffusion of heat is faster than of salt; this is analogous to the way in which just unstirred coffee goes cold before the sugar has diffused to the top. Because the water becomes cooler but remains salty, it becomes denser than the fluid layer beneath it. This makes the perturbation grow and causes the downward extension of a salt finger. As this finger grows, additional thermal diffusion accelerates this effect.

== Role of salt fingers in oceans ==
Double diffusive convection plays a significant role in upwelling of nutrients and vertical transport of heat and salt in oceans. Salt fingering contributes to vertical mixing in the oceans. Such mixing helps regulate the gradual overturning circulation of the ocean, which controls the climate of the earth. Apart from playing an important role in controlling the climate, fingers are responsible for upwelling of nutrients which support flora and fauna. The most significant aspect of finger convection is that it transports the fluxes of heat and salt vertically, which has been studied extensively during the last five decades.

== Governing equations ==
The conservation equations for vertical momentum, heat, and salinity (under Boussinesq's approximation) have the following form for double diffusive salt fingers:
$${\nabla}\cdot U =0$$
$$\frac{\partial U}{\partial t} + U\cdot\nabla  U  = \nu {\nabla}^2 U - g(\beta \Delta S-\alpha \Delta T)\mathbf{k}$$
$$\frac{\partial T}{\partial t} + U\cdot\nabla T = k_T {\nabla}^2 T$$
$$\frac{\partial S}{\partial t} + U\cdot\nabla S = k_S {\nabla}^2 S,$$
where U and W are velocity components in horizontal (x axis) and vertical (z axis) directions, k is the unit vector in the z-direction, k_{T} is the molecular diffusivity of heat, k_{S} is the molecular diffusivity of salt, α is the coefficient of thermal expansion at constant pressure and salinity, and β is the haline contraction coefficient at constant pressure and temperature.

The above set of conservation equations governing the two-dimensional finger-convection system is non-dimensionalised using the following scaling: the depth of the total layer height H is chosen as the characteristic length, and velocity (U, W), salinity (S), temperature (T), and time (t) are non-dimensionalised as
$$x=\frac{X}{H} ,  z=\frac{Z}{H},  u=\frac{U}{k_T /H},  w= \frac{W}{k_T /H},  S^*= \frac{S-S_B}{S_T-S_B} ,   T^*= \frac{T-T_B}{T_T-T_B}, t^* = \frac{t}{H^2 /k_T },$$
where (T_{T}, S_{T}) and (T_{B}, S_{B}) are the temperature and concentration of the top and bottom layers respectively. On introducing the above non-dimensional variables, the above governing equations reduce to the following form:
$${\nabla}\cdot u =0$$
$$\frac{\partial u}{\partial t^*} + u\cdot\nabla  u  = Pr {\nabla}^2 u - \left[Pr Ra_T (\frac{S^*}{R_\rho}-T^*)\right] \mathbf{k}$$
$$\frac{\partial T^*}{\partial t^*} + u\cdot\Delta T^* = {\nabla}^2 T^*$$
$$\frac{\partial S^*}{\partial t^*} + u\cdot\Delta S^* = \frac{1}{Le} {\nabla}^2 S^*,$$
where R_{ρ} is the density stability ratio, Ra_{T} is the thermal Rayleigh number, Pr is the Prandtl number, and Le is the Lewis number. These are defined as
$$R_\rho  = \frac{\alpha \Delta T }{\beta \Delta S}, Ra_T = \frac{g\alpha \Delta T H^3}{\nu k_T}, Pr=\frac{\nu}{k_T}, Le=\frac{k_T}{k_S} .$$
Figure 1 shows the evolution of salt fingers in a heat-salt system for different Rayleigh numbers at a fixed R_{ρ}. It can be noticed that thin and thick fingers form at different Ra_{T}. The fingers' flux ratio, growth rate, kinetic energy, evolution pattern, width, etc. are found to be functions of Rayleigh numbers and R_{ρ}. The flux ratio is another important non-dimensional parameter. It is the ratio of heat and salinity fluxes, defined as
$$R_f=\frac{\alpha T'}{\beta S'}.$$
Time-dependent analytic self-similar solutions can be derived which contain Gaussian and error functions.

== Applications ==
Double diffusive convection holds importance in natural processes and engineering applications. The effect of double diffusive convection is not limited to oceanography; it also occurs in geology, astrophysics, and metallurgy.

== See also ==
- Rayleigh number
- Prandtl number
- Schmidt number
- Diffusive–thermal instability
- Turing instability
