= Vaisala (disambiguation) =

Vaisala can refer to:

== Last name ==
- Vilho Väisälä (1899–1969), Finnish meteorologist and businessman
- Yrjö Väisälä (1891–1971), Finnish astronomer and physicist

== Other ==
- 139P/Väisälä–Oterma, a periodic comet discovered by Yrjö Väisälä and Liisi Oterma
- 1573 Väisälä, a minor planet named for Yrjö Väisälä
- Brunt–Väisälä frequency, the angular frequency at which a vertically displaced parcel will oscillate within a statically stable environment
- Schmidt-Väisälä camera, a type of telescope
- Vaisala (crater), a lunar crater named for Yrjö Väisälä
- Vaisala, Samoa, a village in Samoa
- Vaisala, a Finnish company founded by Vilho Väisälä
