= Väisälä =

Väisälä may refer to:

- Vaisala, Samoa, a village in the island of Savai'i
- Vilho Väisälä (1889–1969), Finnish meteorologist and physicist
  - Vaisala, a company founded by Vilho Väisälä
- Yrjö Väisälä (1891–1971), Finnish astronomer and physicist
  - 1573 Väisälä, a main belt asteroid
  - Väisälä (crater), a lunar impact crater

== See also ==
- Brunt–Väisälä frequency
- Schmidt-Väisälä camera, an astronomical telescope
- 139P/Väisälä–Oterma, a periodic comet in the Solar System
