= Channel drift =

Phenomena of programming format changes by television networks

Channel drift or network decay is the gradual shift of a television network away from its original programming in order to target a different, more profitable audience. Channel drift can also be a network's attempts to broaden its viewership by incorporating less specialized content. This drift often results in a shift from informative or artistic quality programming—designed for educated viewers—toward sensational, ratings-based, or reality-style programming designed to entertain a mass audience. With channel drift, a channel's schedule often incorporates infotainment, reality television, and substantial advertising.

== United States ==
=== Cable ===
Networks that focus primarily on a specific topic—such as the History Channel—tend to add shows that the channel's management feels are wanted by a larger audience. The degree of channel drift can vary. Some nonconforming programming may retain an association with the channel's original purpose; examples on the History Channel include shows such as Pawn Stars, American Pickers, and Top Shot. A channel such as Animal Planet offers the show Tanked. Some programming may have no association with a network's original focus; examples include Ax Men and Ice Road Truckers, which aired on the History Channel.

Channel drift can also result from acquiring sports rights or reruns of popular television series that would otherwise not fit a channel's format. Outdoor Life Network, for instance, acquired the rights for the National Hockey League in 2005. This acquisition caused the network to transition toward a general sports network known as NBC Sports Network (NBCSN). Conversely, WGN America abandoned its expensive sports packages in 2014 as part of drifting from a Chicago-centered superstation into a nationally oriented general entertainment channel. WGN America eventually began a gradual transition away from entertainment programming (which was structured so as to fulfill contractual commitments for existing syndicated programming); the network adopted a cable news format and rebranded itself as NewsNation in March 2021.

A channel may rebrand itself to more accurately reflect the new content. The Sci-Fi Channel changed its name to Syfy for two reasons: to protect its trademark, and to allow stretching the network's definition of appropriate programming to include content such as Law & Order: Special Victims Unit reruns and ECW professional wrestling. Another example of rebranding is the conversion of Warner Bros' Court TV—which was revived as a digital subchannel network in 2019—to TruTV. This rebranding allowed the channel to include more reality-based programming, though initially retaining a focus on law enforcement, including reruns of World's Wildest Police Videos. This rebranding also allowed the channel to slowly phase out its legal system and courtroom programming, which were unappealing for advertisers. This process ended in October 2009, when the remaining courtroom analysis programs transitioned to CNN's legal news section with occasional courtroom coverage from CNN Center on the mainline channel. TruTV then aired competitions, hidden camera prank shows, and the first three rounds of the NCAA Division I men's basketball tournament. TruTV was further reformatted toward a more conventional reality network, strongly emphasizing comedy, on October 27, 2014; then it was reformatted for full-time comedy programming in 2016 with the addition of scripted programming. Other rebranding examples include the following: The Learning Channel, which has officially renamed itself using the orphan initialism TLC since the channel transitioned primarily to reality television series; and the Travel Channel, renamed as the Trvl Channel, which abandoned its destination-themed shows for paranormal programming.

MTV Networks (now part of the conglomerate Paramount Skydance) was an early example of channel drift. Music Television (as MTV was originally called) was originally devoted to music videos when launched in August 1981. But in the 1990s, MTV began adding reality programs and other entertainment aimed at a young adult audience, beginning a gradual progression toward its current focus on reality and scripted programming. Music videos on the main channel were eventually limited to overnight and morning times, and these were eventually pushed to the spin-off networks MTV2 and later to MTV Hits. MTV2 gradually drifted from an all-music video format to include reruns of MTV programs, original series, and acquired off-network sitcoms. In the fall of 2016, MTV Hits was discontinued in favor of NickMusic.

Likewise, Video Hits One began as an outlet for adult contemporary music, before transitioning to a Black-targeted pop-culture channel with the name VH1. Country Music Television drifted toward Southern culture and general rerun programming under the name CMT. Perhaps most dramatically, The Nashville Network drifted toward a general entertainment format as The National Network, now known as TNN; then it drifted to heavily male-oriented programming under the name Spike, only to drift back toward general entertainment in 2015, and then become the Paramount Network in 2018.

While Nickelodeon has largely remained a children's channel historically, its late-night Nick at Nite programming block (which Nielsen TV ratings treat as a different channel than Nickelodeon) has drifted significantly—from classic television (first from the Golden Age of Television, and later also from the 1960s and 1970s), to more recent shows still airing in local syndication, to its current focus on teenage and young adult audiences similar to those of ABC Family (now Freeform). Nick at Nite launched TV Land as a spin-off channel because of the channel's increased focus on more recent programming (as well as the elimination of non-sitcom programming on Nick at Nite); ironically, TV Land eventually shifted to more recent programming and original programming. In recent years, networks such as Cozi TV and MeTV have emerged to fill the gap, programming mainly television shows from the 1950s and 1960s; even these networks have relegated older content to the early hours of their broadcast days, in favor of more recent content. Retro Television Network is the most prominent network still focused on television shows from the 1950s and 1960s.

Nickelodeon's cable channel Nicktoons provides another example of channel drift, though that channel was already an overflow channel for Nickelodeon. In 2014, Nicktoons added sports content to its lineup with little resulting viewer interest, but the new sports block continued, as three of the programs—NFL Rush Zone, WWE Slam City, and Wild Grinders—were produced by sports leagues or to promote Viacom personalities on other networks (e.g., Wild Grinders to promote MTV host Rob Dyrdek). For a time, Nicktoons' schedule began to feature live-action sitcoms on a cyclical basis, depending on the output and success of Nickelodeon's animated series. As of mid-2024, animation-focused spin-off Nicktoons became fully dedicated to reruns of SpongeBob SquarePants.

Channel drift can also result from a network's owner purchasing a competing channel, and then drifting one or both channels' formats to avoid any resulting overlap. TNN was an example of such media cross-ownership, as its Southern cultural programming overlapped extensively with CMT's. ABC Family was another example: The Walt Disney Company's 2001 purchase of the channel from News Corporation dramatically reduced ABC Family's children's programming to avoid redundancy with the Disney Channel. Destination America, a channel prone to frequent format changes historically, began as a network targeting rural middle America. Destination America's parent company, Discovery Communications, purchased the former Scripps cable networks, bringing it under the same corporate umbrella as Great American Country. Thus, Destination America began to add professional wrestling (briefly) and paranormal ghost-hunting programs to its schedule; the paranormal programming has since shifted to the Travel Channel. Both GAC and Destination America were candidates for complete reformatting in 2019 to make way for the Magnolia Network, which replaced the DIY Network when it launched in 2021. GAC was spun off to Great American Media that same year.

Another case of channel drift is HLN, which began as CNN2. This channel's format originally consisted of rolling half-hour newscasts that were updated periodically throughout the day. A year after its launch, the channel changed its name to CNN Headline News to better reflect this rolling news format. By 2005, the channel's programming began to include hour-long specialty and discussion-based news programs similar to those found on the main CNN channel. Examples include Showbiz Tonight, Nancy Grace, and Issues with Jane Velez-Mitchell. By 2013, the channel had further reduced its rolling news coverage—relegating it to morning and early afternoon time slots—and shifted toward crime mysteries and docudramas, showing programs such as Forensic Files.

The drift of channels to lineups dominated by reruns—as a cost-cutting measure—has become a major trend in the 2020s; cable television has lost subscribers, with general interest channels being especially prone to the trend. Such channels remain with little to distinguish between them, other than price; they range from free ad-supported streaming television channels to Internet television channels designed to compile mostly free archival programming.

=== Broadcast ===
One of the earliest examples of channel drift, predating modern cable television, was programming change at CBS. During the late 1960s, CBS had a reputation for having a disproportionate number of shows that targeted rural and older viewers. Beginning in 1970, incoming network Vice President Fred Silverman orchestrated the "rural purge", which canceled these shows in favor of shows targeting younger, suburban viewers.

A less obvious example of the phenomenon has occurred in American public television since the 1980s. Since the start of the medium in the late 1950s, public television stations—then affiliated with National Educational Television (NET), the precursor to the current PBS—served two specific audiences: on weekdays, they provided instructional programming for children, which was used in schools to supplement traditional curricula; on evenings and weekends, these stations served adults, by scheduling shows offering alternatives to mainstream commercial broadcasting. Such shows included theater, classical music, and literary dramas; they also included serious public affairs initiatives, such as investigative reporting and civil political discussion, formats that had been mostly abandoned by the commercial networks with the end of the Golden Age of Television around 1960. Starting with the Public Broadcasting Act of 1967, the federal government—together with most state governments—invested in the production and distribution of such programming via NET/PBS, as well as the construction of many new stations. The political climate of the time was liberal and thus supportive of governmental funding for television, which developed its institutions accordingly.

However, the 1970s saw a political turn toward conservatism, which led to general suspicion of federal programs; the expected steady increase in public taxpayer support did not materialize, leaving the new PBS and its affiliates with significant budget gaps that needed to be filled from other sources. Pledge drives—an annual or more frequent activity—emerged during the mid-1970s to address cutbacks from the Corporation for Public Broadcasting, which occurred because of political changes and economic recessions. Members of the general public donated money to the station in exchange for certain privileges. Also, stations and program producers began to cultivate so-called underwriting, a modified form of advertising that did not interrupt shows in progress; this underwriting was sought from businesses, particularly large corporations who were motivated by a sense of noblesse oblige (social responsibility) toward their communities and the country at large. In later years, these grants were targeted more toward certain genres, raising suspicions by critics that they constituted de facto commercial advertising. This innovation created another significant source of revenue. Some stations even held week-long auctions of merchandise or services donated by retailers and other businesses; in these auctions, viewers placed bids, and the highest bidder received the item or service in exchange for a donation to the station. These auctions were highly successful in many markets from the 1970s through the 2000s.

To attract audiences who would donate to stations—which, in turn, purchased programming from other stations and producers within the PBS system—program managers increasingly felt it necessary to reduce the proportion of cultural and informational shows, in order to appeal to a broader audience than a small, educated cohort. This reduction was particularly evident during pledge drives, seen as opportunities when new or occasional viewers could be attracted with special programming. This period saw the aging of audiences who were most enthusiastic about serious programming. As a result, program managers felt that younger viewers with more disposable income would be interested in programming more similar to commercial television, rather than formats such as classical dramas (including imports from the British Broadcasting Corporation [BBC]) and documentaries. This perspective led to the introduction of formats such as the following:

- lifestyle-oriented shows featuring hobbies, such as gardening, cooking, and home repair
- specialty or niche informational programs, such as the Nightly Business Report and The Charlie Rose Show
- reruns of some former commercial television shows, such as The Lawrence Welk Show and National Geographic specials
- British and Canadian situation comedies, such as Are You Being Served?, Monty Python's Flying Circus, and The Red Green Show.

This change amounted to exchanging so-called "high-brow" material for more "middle-brow" programming, while avoiding conspicuously mass-appeal formats, such as game shows, crime dramas, sensationalistic news, and celebrity talk shows. By the 1990s and 2000s, pledge drives mainly relied on content such as host TJ Lubinsky's nostalgic music specials (themselves focusing on oldies and adult standards music), as well as self-help seminars of uncertain integrity. Such seminars were not officially sanctioned by PBS, and they were rebuked by the network's ombudsman. Despite the stated goal of appealing to a young or middle-aged audience, PBS could not keep up with rapid developments in cable television, which had begun to offer more sensationalistic and visually compelling media. Some of those new networks began to adopt the "how-to" and lifestyle formats that were originally popularized by PBS (e.g., HGTV and Food Network). That competition, in turn, began influencing programmers to further diminish or even remove shows considered "stuffy" or slow-paced; this process eliminated several long-running staples of the network (e.g., Firing Line [original version] and Wall Street Week).

Around this time, developing technologies such as video cassette recorders (VCRs) gave schoolteachers the flexibility to schedule their classes independently of broadcast schedules for instructional material; typically, either school support staff recorded instructional shows, or teachers did so using their VCRs' overnight silent-record function. (Some stations accommodated this practice by using what would otherwise be "dead air" time.) Some PBS stations took advantage of these changes to provide educational programs directly to schools without using any airtime, a practice that accelerated with the emergence of video on demand via the Internet in the 2000s. This practice created a void during daytime hours, which PBS executives filled with a new generation of children's programming, aimed at preschoolers. To supplement popular historic programs such as Sesame Street and Reading Rainbow, the network and leading stations developed several animated series with an educational or ethical emphasis. Around this time, commercial stations and networks were generally canceling children's cartoons, many of which were considered of dubious quality. These cancellations followed changing viewing habits, as well as the Federal Communications Commission (FCC) mandate in 1996 requiring all broadcast stations to include at least three hours per week of informational and educational programs for young people.

As a result, because the original mission of public television had drastically changed in both dimensions since the 1950s—after technological, political, and cultural shifts—channel drift became endemic to PBS and its affiliates. This trend has left a void for adult viewers, which has been filled by other sources, such as the Classic Arts Showcase (distributed via cable and satellite), which is funded entirely by an endowment from the estate of its founder; this channel does not depend on any donations or government funding, unlike the PBS system. Serious, civil public affairs programming can be found on the C-SPAN networks, non-profit public services provided by cable companies and paid for by a portion of each customer's monthly bill. This offering supplements PBS news programming such as the PBS Newshour and Washington Week, two of the remaining public affairs programs on a national schedule.

=== Counterexamples ===
Channel drift does not always succeed, and often leads to backlash. For instance, The Weather Channel (TWC) faced criticism for attempting to add entertainment programming to its schedule, which had historically focused on weather news and information; this criticism culminated in the controversial introduction of a Friday-night movie block featuring films somehow using weather as a plot point (such as The Perfect Storm). Citing the network's carriage fees and drift toward entertainment content, Dish Network dropped TWC and replaced it with WeatherNation's The Weather Cast on 21 May 2010—and then reached a deal to carry TWC again three days later. In January 2014, TWC faced a similar carriage dispute with DirecTV, which dropped the channel citing its carriage fees and complaints from viewers over its amount of reality programming. DirecTV added a competing channel, WeatherNation TV, as an alternative to TWC. TWC reached a new carriage agreement with DirecTV on 8 April 2014, with the network agreeing to reduce its amount of reality programming on weekdays.

The former Family Channel is one of a few instances in which the amount of channel drift was limited to some degree. Launching as the religious network CBN Satellite Service (a cable extension of televangelist Pat Robertson's Christian Broadcasting Network) in 1977, the Family Channel later incorporated family-oriented secular programs by 1984, which became the channel's dominant form of programming for nearly two decades. In 1990, CBN agreed to spin off the network to International Family Entertainment, but with strings attached: the channel was required to air CBN's flagship program The 700 Club twice each weekday, in addition to a day-long CBN telethon each January in perpetuity, as part of a long-term time-buy (brokered programming). Following its sale to News Corporation, CBN made another long-term time-buy on the Family Channel to add a daily half-hour CBN talk show, then known as Living the Life, to the lineup.

After The Walt Disney Company acquired the Family Channel from News Corporation in 2001, Disney planned to reformat the channel as "XYZ" (a reverse reference to the American Broadcasting Company's abbreviation), and shift its target to a hipper audience, such as college students or young women. (This was possibly done to avoid redundancies with their existing family-friendly Disney Channel.) To create XYZ, it would have been necessary to end Fox Family—Disney would have needed to create XYZ as an entirely new network, as well as negotiate carriage agreements with pay television providers from scratch. That process is fairly common in modern times, but it would have been relatively disruptive for one of the most widely distributed channels on cable. Nevertheless, under the ABC Family brand, the Family Channel drifted from its strictly family-friendly format under Disney ownership. The channel gradually dropped series aimed at children, and it incorporated instead programs aimed at young adults featuring profanity, some violence, and some sexual content—alongside its family-oriented series and films. The channel now airs a standard disclaimer before each broadcast of The 700 Club, in which The Walt Disney Company disclaims any connection to the show. Disney further denied that any "family" stipulation existed in late 2015, when it announced plans to rename the channel "Freeform" in January 2016.

In February 2009, Disney XD was originally launched as a television channel oriented toward boys, with the parent channel's shows aimed primarily at girls aged 8–16. Four years later, after the network was found to have a surprisingly high female audience, Disney XD added some programs with female protagonists, such as Kim Possible and Star vs. the Forces of Evil, while maintaining a mostly action-driven format.

In the early-2010s, USA Network—which created a niche for lighthearted comedy-dramas during the 2000s—attempted to augment these with original sitcoms (such as Benched and Sirens) to build upon its acquisition of off-network reruns of Modern Family. USA mostly backed away from this approach by 2014, as it prepared a shift away from the previous "blue sky" direction of its drama slate.

Starting in the late 2010s and early 2020s, networks have started abandoning the practice of channel drift, as some of the channels experienced poor results. AMC (originally an outlet for American Movie Classics) drifted successfully into premium scripted dramas in the late 2000s; examples included Mad Men, The Walking Dead, and Breaking Bad. However, a further drift into unscripted shows was mostly unsuccessful. Examples included 4th and Loud, a docuseries focusing on an Arena Football League team owned by members of the rock band Kiss; and Game of Arms, a reality series following competitive arm wrestlers. This failure prompted the network to cancel all but two of the shows, in favor of focusing more on its core scripted slate. The surviving shows were Comic Book Men, a docuseries following a comic book store owned by filmmaker Kevin Smith; and the talk show Talking Dead, related to the horror drama The Walking Dead.

Due to economic forces, HGTV began to channel drift in 2025; after the network lost half its audience that year because of widespread migration away from cable, it canceled much of its expensive original programming and filled the airtime with holiday films from the Warner Bros. Discovery library, dismaying the network's viewers.

== Outside the United States ==
In some countries, cable television channels are subject to rules and regulations from that country's communications bureau and must be licensed accordingly.

=== Canada ===
In Canada, specialty television channels were initially subject to license conditions requiring them to operate within quotas of specific program categories. This system was designed by the country's telecommunications regulator, the Canadian Radio-television and Telecommunications Commission (CRTC), primarily to ensure the integrity of channels that were licensed with the expectation of a specific format, and to prevent undue competition with established channels—a practice referred to as the "genre protection" rules.

For example, the presence of established Canadian music channel MuchMusic led to the application of genre protection rules to the later launch of MTV-branded channels in Canada; Craig Media's MTV Canada was licensed as a channel featuring entertainment and informal education programming targeting youth and young adults, and it could devote a maximum of 10% of weekly programming to "music video clips" in order to protect MuchMusic. However, its owner, CHUM Limited, complained—and also accused Craig of having used the pretense of a youth-based service to contravene the genre protection rule by ultimately offering a music-based service. In response, the CRTC ruled that MTV Canada violated this quota because of music video content within programs such as Making the Video and MTV Select, even though the program categories distinguish music-related programs and music videos. By contrast, the sibling channel MTV2 Canada could devote its full lineup to music video programming, because it was licensed as part of "Music 5"—a specialty service consisting of channels devoted to specific genres of music.

A second incarnation of MTV Canada was launched by CTVglobemedia in 2005; it was also restricted in airing music content, but this time as the result of drifting from its original format as TalkTV.

Over time, many channels found ways to adjust their programming to more popular content, while technically complying with their genre licensing. An example was the original Canadian version of Bravo! (now CTV Drama Channel), which replaced performing arts programming with more scripted drama. In 2015, the CRTC said that it would no longer enforce most remaining genre protection rules, except for those related to sports programming. Since then, many Canadian channels have altered their formats considerably. For example, the former Outdoor Life Network (OLN) first became a male-skewing reality-focused channel under the OLN name; then it rebranded itself as a new version of Bravo, based on the current version of the US channel with that name (now a reality channel targeting women) in 2024.

=== South Africa ===
The South African Broadcasting Corporation originally dedicated its three main channels to specific ethnic groups and their home languages. SABC 1 primarily broadcast shows targeting Bantu speakers, while SABC 2 focused on Afrikaans programming, and SABC 3 aimed at English speakers. After the end of the apartheid system, SABC2 eventually transitioned to a mix of English and other languages, including Afrikaans. More programming—most prominently, KykNET—shifted to other venues, such as the DStv service.

=== Philippines ===
In 2017, when Chot Reyes became president and CEO of TV5 Network Inc., AksyonTV began shifting to a complementary sibling station of TV5. AksyonTV started airing reruns of US series that had previously been aired on TV5, Including Arrow and Supernatural, as well as Movie Max 5 block and home shopping—instead of live sports programming. In December of that year, the channel added classic TV5 local programming. The network also extended its broadcast hours until 1:00 am on selected days. This practice was heavily criticized by viewers—putting news programs and coverage on hold for such programming. In a complementary role, Cignal, a sister company of TV5, launched its 24-hour satellite news channel, One News; this channel combines news content from the media companies owned by MediaQuest, including News5. In 2019, AksyonTV was then rebranded as 5 Plus (later One Sports in 2020).

On a similar note, in September 2020, GMA Network, Inc.'s GMA News TV (formerly QTV) began a gradual transition from its original news format to general entertainment and sports. These changes were met with mounting viewer criticism when entertainment programs should have been preempted by news coverage—notably when the Philippines was hit by Typhoon Goni (Rolly). The channel later rebranded itself as GTV in February 2021.

== See also ==
- Enshittification
- Key demographic
- Radio homogenization
