= Robert J. Sigg =

American media executive

- Occupation: Media executive
- Television: Real America's Voice; WeatherNation TV
- Children: Austin Reed Sigg

Robert J. Sigg is an American media executive and owner of Colorado-based Performance One Media, which is the holding company for Real America's Voice and WeatherNation TV. Sigg's career in media began with Turner Media Group and outdoor sports channel In Country Television.

== History ==
In 2004, Sigg was charged with mortgage fraud in the United States District Court for the District of Colorado and was convicted in 2006. He had previously been arrested for burglary and assault in Jefferson County, Colorado, drug distribution in Weld County, Colorado, domestic violence in Parker, Colorado, and assault and battery in Aurora, Colorado.

In 2006, Sigg founded Performance One Media, which originally focused on placing infomercials on cable television. In 2007, Sigg's previous media venture, Turner Media Group, filed for Chapter 11 bankruptcy protection.

In 2010, Sigg's Performance One Media gained trademark and brand rights to Paul Douglas' WeatherNation. Performance One Media later gained full ownership and control over WeatherNation following a lawsuit against it in 2014.

In 2012, Sigg's son Austin kidnapped and murdered 10-year-old girl Jessica Ridgeway.

In 2018, WeatherNation TV was dropped by DirecTV. In 2019, Sigg's network purchased distribution rights to Steve Bannon's War Room podcast. In 2021, Sigg discussed his desire to turn his network's footage of Donald Trump rallies into non-fungible tokens.
