= SiegedSec =

Hacktivist group

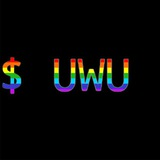
- SiegedSec's Telegram group icon
- Nickname: "Gay Furry Hackers"
- Formation: April 2022; 4 years ago
- Dissolved: July 2024; 2 years ago
- Type: Cybercrime gang
- Region served: International
- Methods: Hacking
- Members: "vio", "Kry", "kit", "mirrorless"
- Official language: English
- Leader: "vio"

SiegedSec, short for Sieged Security and commonly self-described as the "Gay Furry Hackers", was a black-hat criminal hacktivist group that was formed in early 2022, that committed a number of high profile cyber attacks, including attacks on NATO, Idaho National Laboratory, and Real America's Voice. On July 10, 2024, after attacking The Heritage Foundation, the group announced that they would be disbanding in an effort to avoid closer scrutiny.

== Description ==
SiegedSec was led by an individual under the alias "vio". Short for "Sieged Security", SiegedSec's Telegram channel was first created in April 2022, and they commonly referred to themselves as "gay furry hackers". SiegedSec has targeted a wide variety of organisations, ranging from intergovernmental organisations like NATO and federal research facilities like the Idaho National Laboratory to right-wing movements like The Heritage Foundation and Real America's Voice, and various U.S. states that have pursued legislative decisions against gender-affirming care.

== Notable attacks ==
=== Atlassian ===
On February 14, 2023, major Australian software provider Atlassian had its data leaked on the internet by SiegedSec, which used stolen employee credentials. 13,000 employee records were affected in this hack, and SiegedSec was also able to obtain floorplans for Atlassian offices.

=== #OpTransRights movements ===
In June 2023, SiegedSec targeted several United States government entities to protest anti–gender-affirming-care bills. The hackers released a variety of data including data from the city of Fort Worth, Texas, the Nebraska Supreme Court, and South Carolina police files. Later, in April and May 2024, SiegedSec began their second trans rights operation, #OpTransRights2. The hackers successfully targeted and leaked data from Real America's Voice, stole funds from River Valley Church and spent it on "inflatable sea lions", and leaked data from Westboro Baptist Church.

=== University of Connecticut ===
SiegedSec sent a series of spoof emails to undergraduate University of Connecticut students using LISTSERV in July 2023, falsely announcing the "Unfortunate Passing of Radenka Maric". During an interview with the Hartford Courant, "vio" claimed responsibility for the incident, explained the vulnerability which allowed for them to perform the hack, and said that they "did it for the lulz".

=== NATO ===
In 2023, NATO portals were compromised twice by SiegedSec. The leak totalled over 3000 internal documents. The portals compromised were Joint Advanced Distributed Learning, NATO Lessons Learned Portal, Logistics Network Portal, Communities of Interest Cooperation Portal, NATO Investment Division Portal, and NATO Standardization Office. Shortly after the incident, NATO announced that they would be investigating the attack.

=== Bezeq ===
On October 30, 2023, SiegedSec attacked Bezeq, one of the largest Israeli telecommunication providers. The hackers released information on nearly 50,000 customers.

=== Idaho National Laboratory ===
In November 2023, Idaho National Laboratory's Oracle HR system was compromised leading to the leaking of personal employee data, with the group demanding that the laboratory put research into "creating real-life catgirls" in exchange for the data to be removed. On February 7, 2024, a number of employees received ransom payment requests in the mail with their data.

=== The Heritage Foundation ===
In July 2024, SiegedSec announced that they had breached and leaked data from conservative think tank The Heritage Foundation, which has led the Project 2025 proposals. They released a statement on Telegram, calling the proposals "an authoritarian Christian nationalist plan to reform the United States government." A Heritage spokesperson dismissed the attacks as "a false narrative and an exaggeration", stating that all databases, systems and websites remained secure. The hacking group released chatlogs of a conversation on Signal between "vio" and Heritage Foundation executive Mike Howell, in which Howell stated that he, in collaboration with the FBI, was "in the process of identifying and outting [sic] members of your group."

=== Teen Challenge ===
In August 2025, an older SiegedSec breach surfaced on Distributed Denial of Secrets. Over 100 gigabytes of documents from a Christian faith-based rehabilitation organization, Teen Challenge, was published. Teen Challenge was previously under scrutiny for allegations of abuse, cult-like behavior, conversion therapy, and allegedly contributing to the death of a 15 year old. DDoSecrets states the breach was obtained by SiegedSec prior to claims of an FBI raid on SiegedSec's leader.

== Collaborations ==
Anonymous Sudan

On November 8th 2023, SiegedSec collaborated with Anonymous Sudan with a claimed breach of Israeli telecommunications company Cellcom in an operation against Israel during the Gaza–Israel conflict. A week later, on November 14th 2023, SiegedSec and Anonymous Sudan posted a claimed attack of critical infrastructure (Including BACnet and Global navigation satellite system devices) within Israel, in the same operation against Israel.

Five Families

In August 2023, an alliance of hacking groups was founded, consisting of SiegedSec, Ghost Security, BlackForums, ThreatSec, and Stormous Ransomware. This alliance went on to claim multiple breaches until eventual inactivity.

ByteMeCrew

In December 2023, SiegedSec announced a partnership with hacktivist group ByteMeCrew, claiming a breach against Stalkerware app TheTruthSpy. The two groups worked with Maia arson crimew to report on the breach as part of an ongoing effort against stalkerware. SiegedSec and ByteMeCrew continued claiming breaches until ByteMeCrew's disbandment.

KittenSec

SiegedSec collaborated with hacktivist group KittenSec, sharing both "lulz" and anti-NATO motives during attacks on Romania, Greece, France, Chile, Panama, and Italy.

== Disbandment ==
After releasing the Heritage Foundation chatlogs, SiegedSec announced that they would be disbanding "for our own mental health, the stress of mass publicity, and to avoid the eye of the FBI."
