= AerisWeather =

American weather data provider

Whether or Knot LLC
- Trade name: AerisWeather
- Type: Private
- Industry: Environmental data
- Defunct: January 27, 2022
- Fate: Acquired by Vaisala and rebranded as Xweather
- Headquarters: Eden Prairie, Minnesota
- Key people: Paul Douglas, David Hubbard, Michael Vaughan, Craig Mataczynski
- Products: Weather API, tile and vector weather maps, WeatherBlox widgets
- Parent: Vaisala
- Website: xweather.com

Whether or Knot LLC, d/b/a AerisWeather, is a global weather RESTful API and tile mapping layer provider established by Paul Douglas, David Hubbard, Michael Vaughan, and Craig Mataczynski. It is based in Eden Prairie, Minnesota. The company is owned by Vaisala Group following an acquisition in late January 2022.

== History ==
Paul Douglas first had the idea for outsourced weather production in 1979 but shelved it due to the expected high cost, mostly for satellite feeds ($5 to $7 million a month). After being laid off from WCCO-TV in 2008, Douglas started WeatherNation, as broadband's growing availability decreased the costs. Douglas was CEO and Todd Frostad, formerly of Digital River and a commercial real estate businessman, was president and co-owner. The company hired 5 other meteorologists. One of the company's first clients was the St. Cloud Times, who signed on during the summer of 2009. Another was KARE, in the launch of its Weather Now subchannel. In 2009, Media Logic, WeatherNation's parent company, purchased HAMWeather, an Atlanta-based company. By November 2009, the company had about two dozen clients, including some Spanish-language stations. WeatherNation also signed on Independent News Network which uses the company for five of its Spanish-language client stations.

On May 20, 2010, the company launched The Weather Cast, a channel developed for Dish Network with the intent to replace The Weather Channel on the satellite provider. Dish, which had been negotiating with the channel on a new carriage agreement, had planned to drop The Weather Channel as a result of a dispute over a planned increase in retransmission consent payments and the provider's dissatisfaction with the channel's decreased reliance on weather forecasts in favor of reality, documentary and other entertainment programming. Weather Cast existed for four days, ceasing operations on May 24, when The Weather Channel reached a multi-year agreement with Dish Network.

The company licensed its WeatherNation trademarks and brand to Performance One Media in 2010 and changed its name to Broadcast Weather. Broadcast Weather was also contracted to produce the WeatherNation programming. With the license out of the WeatherNation trademarks, the company was split into four companies, Broadcast Weather LLC, HAMWeather LLC, Smart Energy LLC, and Singular Logic.

In June 2010, the company with Insight Communications launched the CN2 cable channel to serve the state of Kentucky, providing the weather. By mid-August 2011, Broadcast Weather was providing weather video to Bay News, a San Francisco Bay area iPad-only news service.

On August 1, 2016, Whether or Knot, LLC announced its acquisition of HAMWeather's assets. Via an announcement on the HAMWeather site, it was announced that AerisWeather was to become the trade name for the future developments in the entity's weather API and mapping products, which are currently taking the place under the umbrella of Whether or Knot LLC. The entity that formerly owned AerisWeather was renamed Praedictix. In early April 2020, AerisWeather refreshed PWSweather.com, a site that allows personal weather station users to collect and share data.

=== Acquisition by Vaisala Group ===
AerisWeather was acquired by Vaisala Group on January 27, 2022. On September 28, 2022, Vaisala announced a new brand, Vaisala Xweather, to bring its various data services and acquisitions, including AerisWeather, together under one umbrella.

== Products and services ==
=== Services ===
- AerisWeather API, a global weather API oriented towards business and enterprise applications offering historical, current, and forecast conditions for nearly any location on Earth. A current subscription to the AerisWeather API includes access to all of AerisWeather's data endpoints, including (but not limited to) the air quality, alerts, conditions, forecasts, tropical cyclones, storm cells, fires, and lightning endpoints.
  - Webhooks can be utilized to improve efficiency when monitoring for changes in conditions or alert status in defined locations or boundaries.
- AerisWeather Maps offers map layers for visualizing weather data in custom applications. A current subscription to AerisWeather Maps includes access to all of AerisWeather's standard mapping layers, including (but not limited to) base maps, overlays, masks, radar, satellite, alerts, storm threats, storm cells, severe, tropical, lightning, forecast, air quality, outlook, and ocean.
- AerisWeather Flex, an offering that provides full access to both AerisWeather API and AerisWeather Maps for one bundled price.
- AerisWeather MapsGL, a WebGL-based weather mapping option, released by AerisWeather in August of 2022. MapsGL layers use vector image files, providing faster loading times and allowing for smooth and seamless weather animations. A subscription to MapsGL provides access to all of AerisWeather's data layers.
- Lightning Add-On, an API and mapping add-on that provides users with access to premium lightning data and visuals from Vaisala's global lightning network.
- WeatherBlox, embeddable weather widgets powered by the AerisWeather API and Maps.
- PWSweather, a site that allows personal weather station owners to monitor, manage, and archive their device's data.
  - AerisWeather Contributor Plan - Limited API and Maps access is granted to PWS contributors who regularly send data.

== Former Units ==
- Broadcast Weather, LLC provides TV station weather reports
- Ham Weather LLC, development of graphics, data streams and mobile API’s
- Smart Energy LLC, wind forecasts for wind farms
- Singular Logic, patent or patent pending holder of user choice advertising
