= Real America's Voice =

Right-wing American television channel

- Country: United States
- Broadcast area: Nationwide
- Headquarters: Centennial, Colorado

Programming
- Language: English

Ownership
- Owner: Robert J. Sigg
- Parent: Performance One Media
- Sister channels: WeatherNation TV

History
- Launched: September 16, 2020; 6 years ago

Links
- Website: americasvoice.news

Real America's Voice (RAV) is an American right-wing streaming, cable and satellite television channel owned by Performance One Media, LLC, a media company based in Centennial, Colorado. The network launched in 2018 originally as America's Voice News and rebranded to Real America's Voice in September 2020.

== History ==
The network is owned by Robert J. Sigg and is a sister channel to WeatherNation TV. Sigg launched Real America's Voice through his company, Performance One Media in 2018. The company had previously operated WeatherNation before expanding into political media.

The rebranding in 2020 coincided with a broader push into conservative political commentary and live-streaming of pro-Trump rallies. During the 2020 election cycle, Real America's Voice gained popularity among conservative viewers and expanded its reach through streaming platforms and satellite TV distribution.

Real America's Voice has been described as a conservative and right-wing outlet. According to Media Matters and Salon.com publications the network has several programs with Qanon tags attached to particular episodes as well as individual instances where hosts covered Qanon conspiracy content on their show

On April 15, 2024, pro-trans hacktivism group SiegedSec claimed that they had hacked Real America's Voice's Amazon Web Services host. They proceeded to leak personal information on 1200+ users, along with wiping their Amazon S3 Buckets.

In 2025, Real America's Voice was granted access to the White House Press Corps under the Trump administration, with Brian Glenn serving as the channel's chief White House correspondent.

== Programming ==
Shows airing on Real America's Voice include "War Room" hosted by Steve Bannon, "Just the News, No Noise" hosted by John Solomon, "American Sunrise" hosted by Terrance Bates, David Brody, Miranda Khan and Dr. Gina Loudon, "The Charlie Kirk show", "Human Events Daily" hosted by Jack Posobiec, "Securing America" hosted by Frank Gaffney, "Ted Nugent Spirit Campfire", "The Royce White Show", "America's Top 10 Countdown" hosted by Wayne Allyn Root, "Cowboy Logic" hosted by Donna Fiducia and Don Neuen, "Firewall" with Lance Wallnau, and "Free Chapel" with Jentezen Franklin. Previous notable network personalities included former Missouri governor Eric Greitens, 2022 Michigan Republican gubernatorial nominee Tudor Dixon, and journalist Ed Henry. Steve Gruber "The Steve Gruber Show"
