= Internal wave =

Type of wave within a fluid medium

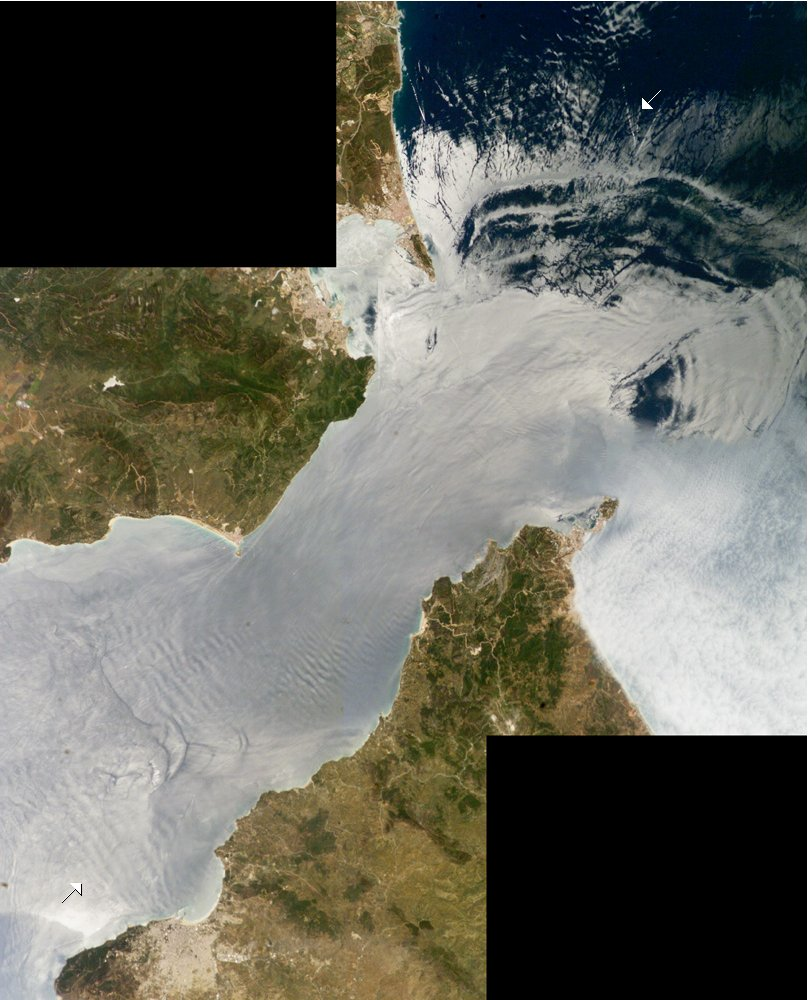
Internal waves (marked with arrows), caused by tidal flow through the Strait of Gibraltar and made visible by sea surface roughness enhance sunlight backscatter

Internal waves are gravity waves that oscillate within a fluid medium, rather than on its surface. To exist, the fluid must be stratified: the density must change (continuously or discontinuously) with depth/height due to changes, for example, in temperature and/or salinity. If the density changes over a small vertical distance (as in the case of the thermocline in lakes and oceans or an atmospheric inversion), the waves propagate horizontally like surface waves, but do so at slower speeds as determined by the density difference of the fluid below and above the interface. If the density changes continuously, the waves can propagate vertically as well as horizontally through the fluid.

Internal waves, also called internal gravity waves, go by many other names depending upon the fluid stratification, generation mechanism, amplitude, and influence of external forces. If propagating horizontally along an interface where the density rapidly decreases with height, they are specifically called interfacial (internal) waves. If the interfacial waves are large amplitude they are called internal solitary waves or internal solitons. If moving vertically through the atmosphere where substantial changes in air density influences their dynamics, they are called anelastic (internal) waves. If generated by flow over topography, they are called Lee waves or mountain waves. If the mountain waves break aloft, they can result in strong warm winds at the ground known as Chinook winds (in North America) or Foehn winds (in Europe). If generated in the ocean by tidal flow over submarine ridges or the continental shelf, they are called internal tides. If they evolve slowly compared to the Earth's rotational frequency so that their dynamics are influenced by the Coriolis effect, they are called inertia gravity waves or, simply, inertial waves. Internal waves are usually distinguished from Rossby waves, which are influenced by the change of Coriolis frequency with latitude.

== Visualization of internal waves ==
An internal wave can readily be observed in the kitchen by slowly tilting back and forth a bottle of salad dressing - the waves exist at the interface between oil and vinegar.

Atmospheric internal waves can be visualized by wave clouds: at the wave crests air rises and cools in the relatively lower pressure, which can result in water vapor condensation if the relative humidity is close to 100%. Clouds that reveal internal waves launched by flow over hills are called lenticular clouds because of their lens-like appearance. Less dramatically, a train of internal waves can be visualized by rippled cloud patterns described as herringbone sky or mackerel sky. The outflow of cold air from a thunderstorm can launch large amplitude internal solitary waves at an atmospheric inversion. In northern Australia, these result in Morning Glory clouds, used by some daredevils to glide along like a surfer riding an ocean wave. Satellites over Australia and elsewhere reveal these waves can span many hundreds of kilometers.

Undulations of the oceanic thermocline can be visualized by satellite because the waves increase the surface roughness where the horizontal flow converges, and this increases the scattering of sunlight (as in the image at the top of this page showing of waves generated by tidal flow through the Strait of Gibraltar).

== Buoyancy, reduced gravity and buoyancy frequency ==
According to Archimedes' principle, the weight of an immersed object is reduced by the weight of fluid it displaces. This holds for a fluid parcel of density $\rho$ surrounded by an ambient fluid of density $\rho_0$. Its weight per unit volume is $g(\rho-\rho_0)$, in which $g$ is the acceleration of gravity. Dividing by a characteristic density, $\rho_{00}$, gives the definition of the reduced gravity:

$$g^\prime \equiv g \frac{\rho-\rho_0}{\rho_{00}}$$

If $\rho>\rho_0$, $g^\prime$ is positive though generally much smaller than $g$. Because water is much more dense than air, the displacement of water by air from a surface gravity wave feels nearly the full force of gravity ($g^\prime \sim g$). The displacement of the thermocline of a lake, which separates warmer surface from cooler deep water, feels the buoyancy force expressed through the reduced gravity. For example, the density difference between ice water and room temperature water is 0.002 the characteristic density of water. So the reduced gravity is 0.2% that of gravity. It is for this reason that internal waves move in slow-motion relative to surface waves.

Whereas the reduced gravity is the key variable describing buoyancy for interfacial internal waves, a different quantity is used to describe buoyancy in continuously stratified fluid whose density varies with height as $\rho_0(z)$. Suppose a water column is in hydrostatic equilibrium and a small parcel of fluid with density $\rho_0(z_0)$ is displaced vertically by a small distance $\Delta z$. The buoyant restoring force results in a vertical acceleration, given by

$$\frac{d^2 \Delta z}{dt^2} = - g^\prime = - g (\rho_0(z_0)-\rho_0(z_0+\Delta z))/\rho_0(z_0) \simeq - g \left(-\frac{d\rho_0}{dz} \Delta z\right)/\rho_0(z_0)$$

This is the spring equation whose solution predicts oscillatory vertical displacement about $z_0$ in time about with frequency given by the buoyancy frequency:

$$N = \left(-\frac{g}{\rho_0} \frac{d\rho_0}{dz}\right)^{1/2}.$$

The above argument can be generalized to predict the frequency, $\omega$, of a fluid parcel that oscillates along a line at an angle $\Theta$ to the vertical:

$$\omega = N \cos\Theta$$.

This is one way to write the dispersion relation for internal waves whose lines of constant phase lie at an angle $\Theta$ to the vertical. In particular, this shows that the buoyancy frequency is an upper limit of allowed internal wave frequencies.

== Mathematical modeling of internal waves ==
The theory for internal waves differs in the description of interfacial waves and vertically propagating internal waves. These are treated separately below.

=== Interfacial waves ===
In the simplest case, one considers a two-layer fluid in which a slab of fluid with uniform density $\rho_1$ overlies a slab of fluid with uniform density $\rho_2$. Arbitrarily the interface between the two layers is taken to be situated at $z=0.$ The fluid in the upper and lower layers are assumed to be irrotational. So the velocity in each layer is given by the gradient of a velocity potential, ${\vec{u}=\nabla\phi,}$ and the potential itself satisfies Laplace's equation:

$$\nabla^2\phi=0.$$

Assuming the domain is unbounded and two-dimensional (in the $x-z$ plane), and assuming the wave is periodic in $x$ with wavenumber $k>0,$ the equations in each layer reduces to a second-order ordinary differential equation in $z$. Insisting on bounded solutions the velocity potential in each layer is

$$\phi_1(x,z,t) = A e^{-kz} \cos(kx - \omega t)$$

and

$$\phi_2(x,z,t) = A e^{kz} \cos(kx - \omega t),$$

with $A$ the amplitude of the wave and $\omega$ its angular frequency. In deriving this structure, matching conditions have been used at the interface requiring continuity of mass and pressure. These conditions also give the dispersion relation:

$$\omega^2 = g^\prime k$$

in which the reduced gravity $g^\prime$ is based on the density difference between the upper and lower layers:

$$g^\prime = \frac{\rho_2-\rho_1}{\rho_2+\rho_1}\, g,$$

with $g$ the Earth's gravity. Note that the dispersion relation is the same as that for deep water surface waves by setting $g^\prime=g.$

=== Internal waves in uniformly stratified fluid ===
The structure and dispersion relation of internal waves in a uniformly stratified fluid is found through the solution of the linearized conservation of mass, momentum, and internal energy equations assuming the fluid is incompressible and the background density varies by a small amount (the Boussinesq approximation). Assuming the waves are two dimensional in the x-z plane, the respective equations are

$$\partial_x u + \partial_z w = 0$$
$$\rho_{00} \partial_t u = - \partial_x p$$
$$\rho_{00} \partial_t w = - \partial_z p - \rho g$$
$$\partial_t \rho = -w d\rho_0/dz$$

in which $\rho$ is the perturbation density, $p$ is the pressure, and $(u,w)$ is the velocity. The ambient density changes linearly with height as given by $\rho_0(z)$ and $\rho_{00}$, a constant, is the characteristic ambient density.

Solving the four equations in four unknowns for a wave of the form $\exp[i(kx+mz-\omega t)]$ gives the dispersion relation

$$\omega^2 = N^2 \frac{k^2}{k^2+m^2} = N^2 \cos^2\Theta$$

in which $N$ is the buoyancy frequency and $\Theta=\tan^{-1}(m/k)$ is the angle of the wavenumber vector to the horizontal, which is also the angle formed by lines of constant phase to the vertical.

The phase velocity and group velocity found from the dispersion relation predict the unusual property that they are perpendicular and that the vertical components of the phase and group velocities have opposite sign: if a wavepacket moves upward to the right, the crests move downward to the right.

== Internal waves in the ocean ==
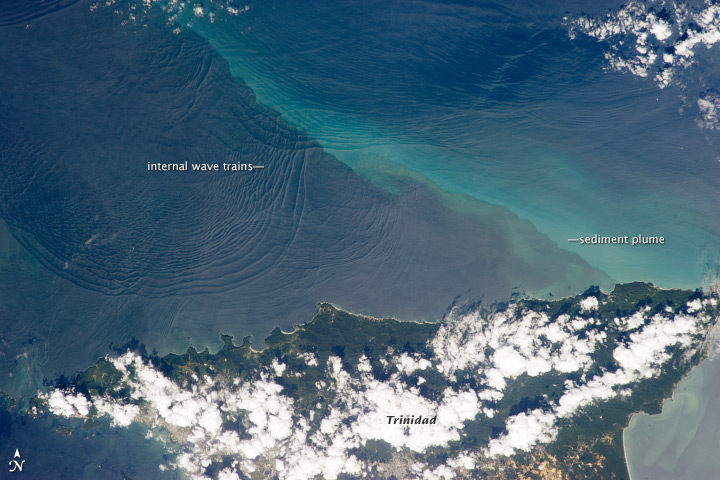
Internal Wave trains around Trinidad, as seen from space

Most people think of waves as a surface phenomenon, which acts between water (as in lakes or oceans) and the air. Where low density water overlies high density water in the ocean, internal waves propagate along the boundary. They are especially common over the continental shelf regions of the world oceans and where brackish water overlies salt water at the outlet of large rivers. There is typically little surface expression of the waves, aside from slick bands that can form over the trough of the waves.

Internal waves are the source of a curious phenomenon called dead water, first reported in 1893 by the Norwegian oceanographer Fridtjof Nansen, in which a boat may experience strong resistance to forward motion in apparently calm conditions. This occurs when the ship is sailing on a layer of relatively fresh water whose depth is comparable to the ship's draft. This causes a wake of internal waves that dissipates a huge amount of energy.

== Properties of internal waves ==
Internal waves typically have much lower frequencies and higher amplitudes than surface gravity waves because the density differences (and therefore the restoring forces) within a fluid are usually much smaller. Wavelengths vary from centimetres to kilometres with periods of seconds to hours respectively.

The atmosphere and ocean are continuously stratified: potential density generally increases steadily downward. Internal waves in a continuously stratified medium may propagate vertically as well as horizontally. The dispersion relation for such waves is curious: For a freely-propagating internal wave packet, the direction of propagation of energy (group velocity) is perpendicular to the direction of propagation of wave crests and troughs (phase velocity). An internal wave may also become confined to a finite region of altitude or depth, as a result of varying stratification or wind. Here, the wave is said to be ducted or trapped, and a vertically standing wave may form, where the vertical component of group velocity approaches zero. A ducted internal wave mode may propagate horizontally, with parallel group and phase velocity vectors, analogous to propagation within a waveguide.

At large scales, internal waves are influenced both by the rotation of the Earth as well as by the stratification of the medium. The frequencies of these geophysical wave motions vary from a lower limit of the Coriolis frequency (inertial motions) up to the Brunt–Väisälä frequency, or buoyancy frequency (buoyancy oscillations). Above the Brunt–Väisälä frequency, there may be evanescent internal wave motions, for example those resulting from partial reflection. Internal waves at tidal frequencies are produced by tidal flow over topography/bathymetry, and are known as internal tides. Similarly, atmospheric tides arise from, for example, non-uniform solar heating associated with diurnal motion.

== Onshore transport of planktonic larvae ==
Cross-shelf transport, the exchange of water between coastal and offshore environments, is of particular interest for its role in delivering meroplanktonic larvae to often disparate adult populations from shared offshore larval pools. Several mechanisms have been proposed for the cross-shelf of planktonic larvae by internal waves. The prevalence of each type of event depends on a variety of factors including bottom topography, stratification of the water body, and tidal influences.

=== Internal tidal bores ===
Similarly to surface waves, internal waves change as they approach the shore. As the ratio of wave amplitude to water depth becomes such that the wave “feels the bottom,” water at the base of the wave slows down due to friction with the sea floor. This causes the wave to become asymmetrical and the face of the wave to steepen, and finally the wave will break, propagating forward as an internal bore. Internal waves are often formed as tides pass over a shelf break. The largest of these waves are generated during springtides and those of sufficient magnitude break and progress across the shelf as bores. These bores are evidenced by rapid, step-like changes in temperature and salinity with depth, the abrupt onset of upslope flows near the bottom and packets of high frequency internal waves following the fronts of the bores.

The arrival of cool, formerly deep water associated with internal bores into warm, shallower waters corresponds with drastic increases in phytoplankton and zooplankton concentrations and changes in plankter species abundances. Additionally, while both surface waters and those at depth tend to have relatively low primary productivity, thermoclines are often associated with a chlorophyll maximum layer. These layers in turn attract large aggregations of mobile zooplankton that internal bores subsequently push inshore. Many taxa can be almost absent in warm surface waters, yet plentiful in these internal bores.

=== Surface slicks ===
While internal waves of higher magnitudes will often break after crossing over the shelf break, smaller trains will proceed across the shelf unbroken. At low wind speeds these internal waves are evidenced by the formation of wide surface slicks, oriented parallel to the bottom topography, which progress shoreward with the internal waves. Waters above an internal wave converge and sink in its trough and upwell and diverge over its crest. The convergence zones associated with internal wave troughs often accumulate oils and flotsam that occasionally progress shoreward with the slicks. These rafts of flotsam can also harbor high concentrations of larvae of invertebrates and fish an order of magnitude higher than the surrounding waters.

=== Predictable downwellings ===
Thermoclines are often associated with chlorophyll maximum layers. Internal waves represent oscillations of these thermoclines and therefore have the potential to transfer these phytoplankton rich waters downward, coupling benthic and pelagic systems. Areas affected by these events show higher growth rates of suspension feeding ascidians and bryozoans, likely due to the periodic influx of high phytoplankton concentrations. Periodic depression of the thermocline and associated downwelling may also play an important role in the vertical transport of planktonic larvae.

=== Trapped cores ===
Large steep internal waves containing trapped, reverse-oscillating cores can also transport parcels of water shoreward. These non-linear waves with trapped cores had previously been observed in the laboratory and predicted theoretically. These waves propagate in environments characterized by high shear and turbulence and likely derive their energy from waves of depression interacting with a shoaling bottom further upstream. The conditions favorable to the generation of these waves are also likely to suspend sediment along the bottom as well as plankton and nutrients found along the benthos in deeper water.

== See also ==
- Dubreil-Jacotin–Long equation, model for internal solitary wave propagation
