= Murder of Jessica Ridgeway =

2012 child murder in Colorado, U.S

Jessica Ridgeway
- Jessica Ridgeway's 5th grade school photo
- Born: January 23, 2002; Colorado, U.S.
- Died: October 5, 2012 (aged 10); Westminster, Colorado, U.S.
- Cause of death: Suffocation caused by strangulation

Jessica Ridgeway was a 10-year-old girl from Westminster, Colorado who was strangled to death on October 5, 2012, by then 17-year-old Austin Sigg after he abducted her while she was walking to school and took her to his bedroom. He then dismembered her body and dumped her torso inside plastic bags along a roadway where it would be found. Prior to Ridgeway's kidnapping, Sigg had attempted to abduct a woman while she was jogging on May 28, 2012, but she had escaped and reported the assault to authorities.

On October 1, 2013, Sigg pled guilty to 15 charges including first-degree murder, sexual assault of a minor, kidnapping, attempted kidnapping, and sexual exploitation of a minor. He was sentenced to life in prison on November 19, 2013.

== Disappearance ==
On October 5, 2012, Ridgeway began walking from her home in Westminster to Witt Elementary School. Hours later, Ridgeway's mother learned from the school that Ridgeway had never arrived. The mother notified law enforcement of her disappearance that afternoon, resulting in a 17-day search and investigation. Investigators canvassed various neighborhoods and collected over 700 DNA samples.

Two days later, Ridgeway's backpack was found with her glasses and assorted clothing items smelling of urine. According to then Chief Deputy District Attorney Hal Sargent, the purpose of the backpack's placement and items was to make clear that Ridgeway was dead. On October 10, Ridgeway's torso was discovered in two black bags on 82nd Street of Pattridge Park, Arvada, Colorado. The location was 9 miles (14 km) from Ridgeway's home. According to Sargent, the bags were thought to be placed explicitly so they would be found.

The Westminster Police Department reported that Ridgeway's abduction was connected to an attempted kidnapping of a woman on May 28, 2012. The woman reported to authorities that a rag with a chemical odor was placed over her face but that she was able to get away and call 911. She described the perpetrator as being white or light skinned, between 18–30 years of age, having brown hair, and being roughly 5 ft 8 in (1.73 m) tall.

== Criminal proceedings ==
=== Perpetrator ===
In 2012, Mindy Sigg called authorities to turn in her son, Austin, for the murder of Ridgeway. According to unsealed court documents, Austin Sigg had become addicted to child pornography at age 12, which therapy had been ineffective in treating. Law enforcement found media on his cell phone that included scenes of human dismemberment, sexual bondage, and rape. According to Sigg's own testimony, his addiction resulted in viewing increasingly more violent material at a steady rate.

Sigg is also the son of media executive Robert J. Sigg.

=== Pre-trial ===
The prosecution originally intended to present a death penalty case against the perpetrator of Ridgeway's death; however, under a 2005 United States Supreme Court decision, because Sigg was a minor at the time of the crime, he was ineligible.

Sigg was initially held without bail at the Mount View Youth Services Center in Lakewood, Colorado. Sigg first appeared in Jefferson County juvenile court on October 25, 2012. On that day the prosecution declared their intent to try Sigg as an adult. Sigg's legal counsel requested and were granted a gag order on case details. At the time the chief prosecutor assigned to the case declined to comment on the specific charges that were planned to be brought before Sigg.

Sigg was formally charged as an adult on October 30 on 17 counts, 11 relating to Ridgeway, and the remaining six relating to the May 28 attempted kidnapping. The counts relating to Ridgeway included first-degree murder after deliberation, second-degree kidnapping, felony murder, and robbery. The counts relating to the kidnapping included first-degree murder, attempted sexual assault, and attempted kidnapping. Due to cited safety concerns as a result of the high-profile nature of the case, only the media and family members of Sigg and Ridgeway were permitted in the court room October 30. More than 15 Jefferson County Sheriff deputies were present. According to the spokesperson of the sheriff's office, no specific threats had been made at the time.

=== Trial ===
Sigg's legal counsel argued that because Sigg was 17 years old at the time of the crime, he was not mature enough to understand the severity of his actions. Conversely, the prosecutors argued that Sigg had "meticulously planned" the attempted abduction of the woman on May 28, 2012, and that Ridgeway's abduction was only four months later.

=== Guilty plea ===
On October 1, 2013, Sigg confessed in Jefferson County District Court and, against the advice of his legal counsel, pled guilty to a total of 15 charges including first-degree murder, sexual assault of a minor, kidnapping, attempted kidnapping, and sexual exploitation of a minor. Sigg also confessed to being the perpetrator of the attempted kidnapping on May 28, 2012. Sigg's adjusted plea was accepted by Judge Stephen Munsinger.

=== Sentencing ===
Sigg was sentenced to life in prison two weeks later on November 19. The sentence granted a possibility of parole after 40 years. However, Munsinger ordered that Sigg serve an additional 86 years once he became eligible for parole. Sigg's legal counsel attempted to argue the sentence was cruel and unusual, but they were dismissed by Munsinger, with him stating, "This case cries out for a life sentence".

In June 2014, Sigg was moved to an undisclosed out-of-state prison to preserve both his and the Ridgeway family's privacy and safety.

== See also ==
- List of kidnappings
- List of solved missing person cases (post-2000)
- List of murdered American children
