= Dead water =

Physical oceanography of internal waves

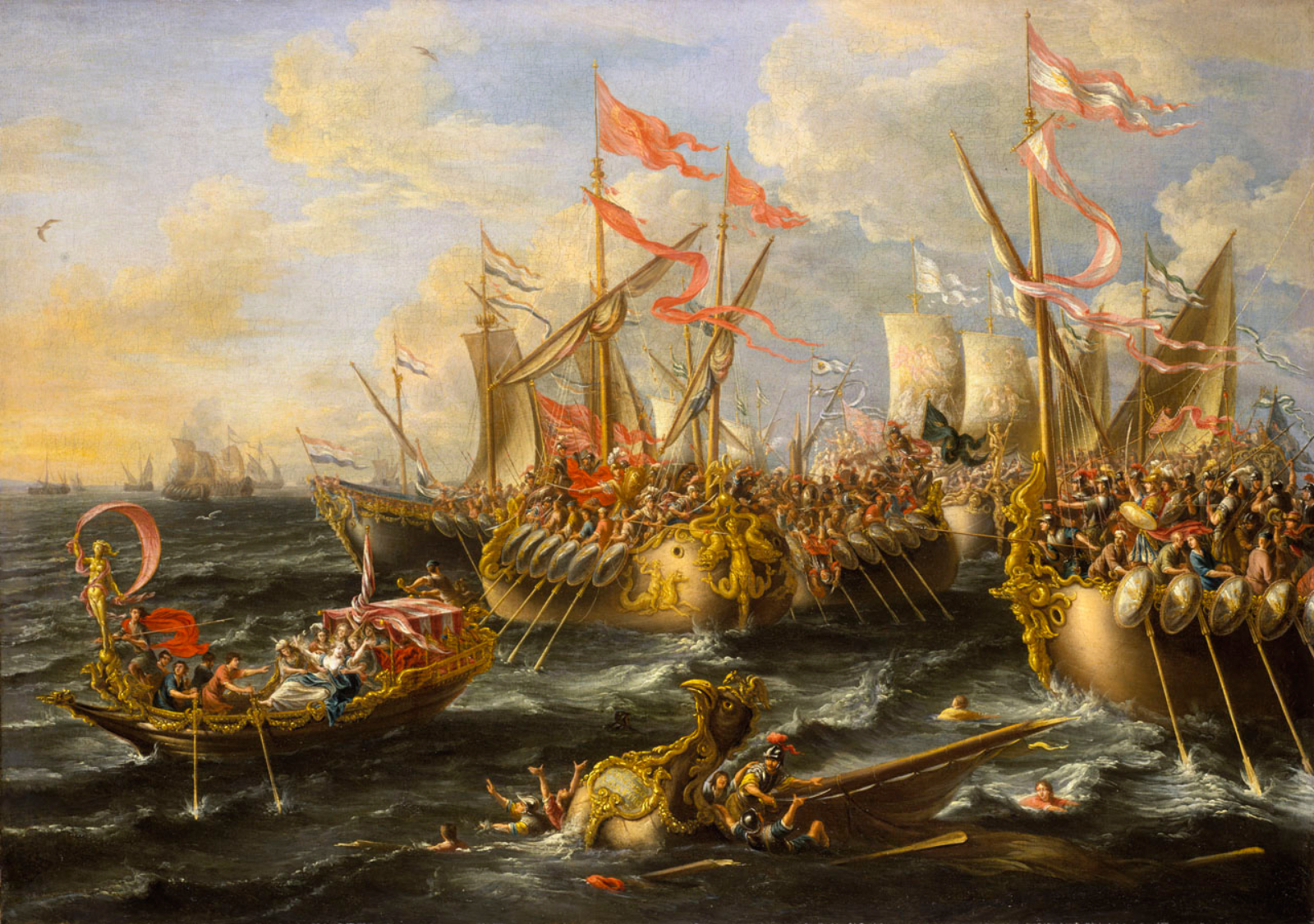
It has been speculated that the "dead water" phenomenon played a role in the Battle of Actium

Dead water is the nautical term for a phenomenon that can occur when there is strong vertical density stratification due to salinity or temperature or both. It is common where a layer of fresh or brackish water rests on top of denser salt water, without the two layers mixing. The phenomenon is frequently, but not exclusively, observed in fjords where glacier runoff flows into salt water without much mixing. The phenomenon is a result of energy producing internal waves that have an effect on the vessel. The effect can also be found at density boundaries between sub surface layers.

In the better known surface phenomenon a ship traveling in a fresh water layer with a depth approximately equal to the vessel's draft will expend energy creating and maintaining internal waves between the layers. The vessel may be hard to maneuver or can even slow down almost to a standstill and "stick". An increase in speed by a few knots can overcome the effect. Experiments have shown the effect can be even more pronounced in the case of submersibles encountering such stratification at depth.

The phenomenon, long considered sailor's yarns, was first described for science by Fridtjof Nansen, the Norwegian Arctic explorer. Nansen wrote the following from his ship Fram in August 1893 in the Nordenskiöld Archipelago near the Taymyr Peninsula:

When caught in dead water Fram appeared to be held back, as if by some mysterious force, and she did not always answer the helm. In calm weather, with a light cargo, Fram was capable of 6 to 7 knots. When in dead water she was unable to make 1.5 knots. We made loops in our course, turned sometimes right around, tried all sorts of antics to get clear of it, but to very little purpose.

Nansen's experience led him to request physicist and meteorologist Vilhelm Bjerknes to study it scientifically. Bjerknes had his student, Vagn Walfrid Ekman, investigate. Ekman, who later described the effect now bearing his name as the Ekman spiral, demonstrated the effect of internal waves as being the cause of dead water.

A modern study by the Université de Poitiers entities CNRS' Institut Pprime and the Laboratoire de Mathématiques et Applications revealed that the effect is due to internal waves moving the vessel back and forth. Two types occur. The first as observed by Nansen causes a constant abnormally slow progress. The second, Ekman type, causes speed oscillations. The Ekman type may be temporary and become Nansen type as the vessel escapes the particular regime causing the oscillating speed. An interesting historical possibility is that the effect caused Cleopatra's ships difficulties and loss at the Battle of Actium in 31 BC, in which legend attributes the loss to remora (suckerfish) attaching to the hulls.

== See also ==
- Ekman spiral
- Ice drift
- Iceberg
- Internal wave
- Nansen's Fram expedition
- Nordenskiöld Archipelago
- Polar ice cap
- Polar ice packs
- Polynya
- Sea ice
- Shelf ice
- Vagn Walfrid Ekman – Swedish oceanographer
