= Natalie Winters =

American political commentator

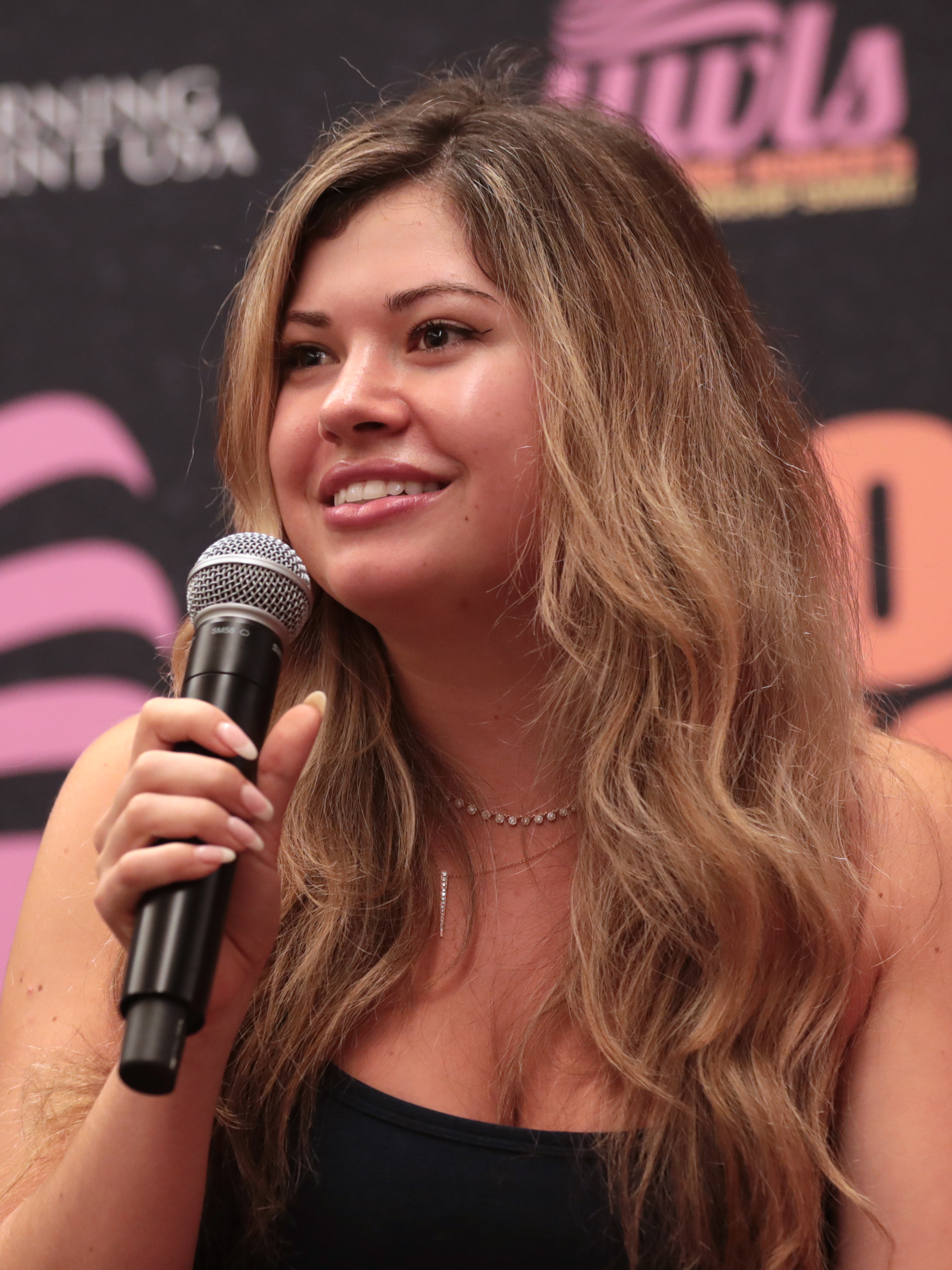
- Winters in 2023
- Born: Los Angeles, California, U.S.
- Education: Harvard-Westlake School
- Alma mater: University of Chicago
- Occupations: Political commentator, journalist
- Employer: War Room podcast with Steve Bannon
- Political party: Republican

Natalie Winters is an American right-wing political commentator known for co-hosting the War Room podcast with Steve Bannon. A self-described "populist nationalist" in the Republican Party, she frequently attacks the mainstream media. Although Winters's bid for the National Press Club was rejected, she has served as a White House correspondent since January 2025.

== Early life and education ==
Winters grew up in Santa Monica, California. Her father works as a physician and her mother is a homemaker. She graduated from Harvard-Westlake School in Los Angeles, where she became politically engaged during the 2016 United States presidential election. During this time, she published an article in the school newspaper supporting Brett Kavanaugh during his Supreme Court nomination.

== Career ==
Winters started an internship with the Bannon's War Room podcast at the end of her senior year of high school, which was then co-hosted by Raheem Kassam. She worked as a staff writer for Bannon's War Room during her first year at the University of Chicago, frequently flying to Washington D.C. "My best friend from college is, like, Steve," she told The New York Times about Bannon. She began to appear on camera for War Room when she was nineteen years old, shortly after the onset of the COVID-19 pandemic.

During Bannon's four month stint in federal prison in 2024, Winters became the sole host of the War Room podcast. She also gained prominence for her appearances on Piers Morgan Uncensored. Winters sells apparel and accessories, such as tank tops and tote bags printed with political slogans such as "More insecure than the border" and "A little bit conspiratorial", through her brand She's So Right.

=== White House correspondent ===
Winters began serving as a White House correspondent on January 28, 2025, in a role arranged by Bannon for the second presidency of Donald Trump. Her social media post on her first day depicted her in front of the White House wearing sneakers, a white skirt, and a pink "appointment" badge around her neck. The post prompted backlash due to her misspelling "correspondent", as well as criticism for the alleged inappropriateness of her outfit.

Winters attends briefings by White House press secretary Karoline Leavitt, who has favored nontraditional right wing sources such as War Room. Winters makes podcast appearances, social media posts, and delivers impromptu monologues to online viewers from outside of the White House. She has been denied membership to National Press Club, which bases acceptance based on "standards of journalism", and has said that some reporters for established news media organizations do not talk to her.
