= Internal tide =

Wave within the ocean interior

Internal tides are generated as the surface tides move stratified water up and down sloping topography, which produces a wave in the ocean interior. So internal tides are internal waves at a tidal frequency. The other major source of internal waves is the wind which produces internal waves near the inertial frequency. When a small water parcel is displaced from its equilibrium position, it will return either downwards due to gravity or upwards due to buoyancy. The water parcel will overshoot its original equilibrium position and this disturbance will set off an internal gravity wave. Munk (1981) notes, "Gravity waves in the ocean's interior are as common as waves at the sea surface-perhaps even more so, for no one has ever reported an interior calm."

== Simple explanation ==
Figure 1: Water parcels in the whole water column move together with the surface tide (top), while shallow and deep waters move in opposite directions in an internal tide (bottom). The surface displacement and interface displacement are the same for a surface wave (top), while for an internal wave the surface displacements are very small, while the interface displacements are large (bottom). This figure is a modified version of one appearing in Gill (1982).

The surface tide propagates as a wave in which water parcels in the whole water column oscillate in the same direction at a given phase (i.e., in the trough or at the crest, Fig. 1, top). This means that while the form of the surface wave itself may propagate across the surface of the water, the fluid particles themselves are restricted to a relatively small neighborhood. Fluid moves upwards as the crest of the surface wave is passing and downwards as the trough passes. Lateral motion only serves to make up for the height difference in the water column between the crest and trough of the wave: as the surface rises at the top of the water column, water moves laterally inward from adjacent downwards-moving water columns to make up for the change in volume of the water column. While this explanation focuses on the motion of the ocean water, the phenomenon being described is in nature an interfacial wave, with mirroring processes happening on either side of the interface between two fluids: ocean water and air.

At the simplest level, an internal wave can be thought of as an interfacial wave (Fig. 1, bottom) at the interface of two layers of the oceans differentiated by a change in the water's properties, such as a warm surface layer and cold deep layer separated by a thermocline. As the surface tide propagates between these two fluid layers at the ocean surface, a homologous internal wave mimics it below, forming the internal tide. The interfacial movement between two layers of ocean is large compared to surface movement because although as with surface waves, the restoring force for internal waves and tides is still gravity, its effect is reduced because the densities of the two layers are relatively similar compared to the large density difference at the air-sea interface. Thus larger displacements are possible inside the ocean than are possible at the sea surface.

Tides occur mainly at diurnal and semidiurnal periods. The principal lunar semidiurnal constituent is known as M2 and generally has the largest amplitudes. (See external links for more information.)

== Location ==
The largest internal tides are generated at steep, midocean topography such as the Hawaiian Ridge, Tahiti, the Macquarie Ridge, and submarine ridges in the Luzon Strait. Continental slopes such as the Australian North West Shelf also generate large internal tides. These internal tide may propagate onshore and dissipate much like surface waves. Or internal tides may propagate away from the topography into the open ocean. For tall, steep, midocean topography, such as the Hawaiian Ridge, it is estimated that about 85% of the energy in the internal tide propagates away into the deep ocean with about 15% of its energy being lost within about 50 km of the generation site. The lost energy contributes to turbulence and mixing near the generation sites. It is not clear where the energy that leaves the generation site is dissipated, but there are 3 possible processes: 1) the internal tides scatter and/or break at distant midocean topography, 2) interactions with other internal waves remove energy from the internal tide, or 3) the internal tides shoal and break on continental shelves.

== Propagation and dissipation ==
Figure 2: The internal tide sea surface elevation that is in phase with the surface tide (i.e., crests occur in a certain spot at a certain time that are both the same relative to the surface tide) can be detected by satellite (top). (The satellite track is repeated about every 10 days and so M2 tidal signals are shifted to longer periods due to aliasing.) The longest internal tide wavelengths are about 150 km near Hawaii and the next longest waves are about 75 km long. The surface displacements due to the internal tide are plotted as wiggly red lines with amplitudes plotted perpendicular to the satellite groundtracks (black lines). Figure is adapted from Johnston et al. (2003).

Briscoe (1975)noted that “We cannot yet answer satisfactorily the questions: ‘where does the internal wave energy come from, where does it go, and what happens to it along the way?’” Although technological advances in instrumentation and modeling have produced greater knowledge of internal tide and near-inertial wave generation, Garrett and Kunze (2007) observed 33 years later that “The fate of the radiated [large-scale internal tides] is still uncertain. They may scatter into [smaller scale waves] on further encounter with islands or the rough seafloor , or transfer their energy to smaller-scale internal waves in the ocean interior ” or “break on distant continental slopes ”. It is now known that most of the internal tide energy generated at tall, steep midocean topography radiates away as large-scale internal waves. This radiated internal tide energy is one of the main sources of energy into the deep ocean, roughly half of the wind energy input . Broader interest in internal tides is spurred by their impact on the magnitude and spatial inhomogeneity of mixing, which in turn has first order effect on the meridional overturning circulation .

The internal tidal energy in one tidal period going through an area perpendicular to the direction of propagation is called the energy flux and is measured in Watts/m$^2$. The energy flux at one point can be summed over depth- this is the depth-integrated energy flux and is measured in Watts/m. The Hawaiian Ridge produces depth-integrated energy fluxes as large as 10 kW/m. The longest wavelength waves are the fastest and thus carry most of the energy flux. Near Hawaii, the typical wavelength of the longest internal tide is about 150 km while the next longest is about 75 km. These waves are called mode 1 and mode 2, respectively. Although Fig. 1 shows there is no sea surface expression of the internal tide, there actually is a displacement of a few centimeters. These sea surface expressions of the internal tide at different wavelengths can be detected with the Topex/Poseidon or Jason-1 satellites (Fig. 2). Near 15 N, 175 W on the Line Islands Ridge, the mode-1 internal tides scatter off the topography, possibly creating turbulence and mixing, and producing smaller wavelength mode 2 internal tides.

The inescapable conclusion is that energy is lost from the surface tide to the internal tide at midocean topography and continental shelves, but the energy in the internal tide is not necessarily lost in the same place. Internal tides may propagate thousands of kilometers or more before breaking and mixing the abyssal ocean.

== Abyssal mixing and meridional overturning circulation ==
The importance of internal tides and internal waves in general relates to their breaking, energy dissipation, and mixing of the deep ocean. If there were no mixing in the ocean, the deep ocean would be a cold stagnant pool with a thin warm surface layer. While the meridional overturning circulation (also referred to as the thermohaline circulation) redistributes about 2 PW of heat from the tropics to polar regions, the energy source for this flow is the interior mixing which is comparatively much smaller- about 2 TW. Sandstrom (1908) showed a fluid which is both heated and cooled at its surface cannot develop a deep overturning circulation. Most global models have incorporated uniform mixing throughout the ocean because they do not include or resolve internal tidal flows.

However, models are now beginning to include spatially variable mixing related to internal tides and the rough topography where they are generated and distant topography where they may break. Wunsch and Ferrari (2004) describe the global impact of spatially inhomogeneous mixing near midocean topography: “A number of lines of evidence, none complete, suggest that the oceanic general circulation, far from being a heat engine, is almost wholly governed by the forcing of the wind field and secondarily by deep water tides... The now inescapable conclusion that over most of the ocean significant ‘vertical’ mixing is confined to topographically complex boundary areas implies a potentially radically different interior circulation than is possible with uniform mixing. Whether ocean circulation models... neither explicitly accounting for the energy input into the system nor providing for spatial variability in the mixing, have any physical relevance under changed climate conditions is at issue.” There is a limited understanding of “the sources controlling the internal wave energy in the ocean and the rate at which it is dissipated” and are only now developing some “parameterizations of the mixing generated by the interaction of internal waves, mesoscale eddies, high-frequency barotropic fluctuations, and other motions over sloping topography.”

== Internal tides at the beach ==
Figure 3: The internal tide produces large vertical differences in temperature at the research pier at the Scripps Institution of Oceanography. The black line shows the surface tide elevation relative to mean lower low water (MLLW). Figure provided by Eric Terrill, Scripps Institution of Oceanography with funding from the U.S. Office of Naval Research

Internal tides may also dissipate on continental slopes and shelves or even reach within 100 m of the beach (Fig. 3). Internal tides bring pulses of cold water shoreward and produce large vertical temperature differences. When surface waves break, the cold water is mixed upwards, making the water cold for surfers, swimmers, and other beachgoers. Surface waters in the surf zone can change by about 10 °C in about an hour.

== Internal tides, internal mixing, and biological enhancement ==
Internal tides generated by tidal semidiurnal currents impinging on steep submarine ridges in island passages, ex: Mona Passage, or near the shelf edge, can enhance turbulent dissipation and internal mixing near the generation site. The development of Kelvin-Helmholtz instability during the breaking of the internal tide can explain the formation of high diffusivity patches that generate a vertical flux of nitrate (NO_{3}^{−}) into the photic zone and can sustain new production locally. Another mechanism for higher nitrate flux at spring tides results from pulses of strong turbulent dissipation associated with high frequency internal soliton packets. Some internal soliton packets are the result of the nonlinear evolution of the internal tide.

== See also ==
- Tide
- Internal wave
- Physical oceanography
