= Xweather =

Vaisala Xweather
- Product type: Weather data and services
- Current owner: Vaisala
- Country: Finland
- Introduced: 2022
- Markets: Worldwide
- Website: xweather.com

Xweather is a suite of weather, climate, and environmental data products and services developed by the Finnish technology company Vaisala.

== History ==
Xweather was introduced in September 2022 as part of Vaisala’s expansion into weather and environmental intelligence services. Earlier that year, in January, Vaisala had acquired U.S.-based weather data provider AerisWeather. Xweather was established to bring Vaisala's various data services and acquisitions, including AerisWeather, together under one umbrella. In 2024, Vaisala acquired and added the WeatherDesk business from Maxar Technologies and Speedwell Climate, a U.K. company specializing in data and software for weather risk transfer, to the Xweather suite.

== Products and services ==
Xweather provides weather and environmental data services, including:

- Weather API endpoints for environmental data, forecasts, severe weather, tropical storms, air quality, and wildfires.
- Mapping and data visualization tools to integrate weather data into applications.
- Weather and energy forecasting for renewable energy operators and utilities.
- Weather data for parametric insurance and financial risk transfer.
- Real-time lightning detection, alerts, and reporting.
- Hail forecasts and alerts.
- Air quality and environmental monitoring data.
- Weather and road-condition data for automotive systems and electric vehicle range estimation.
- Road maintenance support software for municipalities and infrastructure agencies.
- Road-weather monitoring and forecasting for snow removal operations.

== Business model ==
Xweather is part of Vaisala's business diversification strategy, providing subscription-based software as a service and data as a service products alongside Vaisala's core measurement instrumentation business.
