= War Room (podcast) =

Podcast hosted by Steve Bannon

Presentation
- Hosted by: Steve Bannon
- Genre: Politics
- Created by: Steve Bannon
- Language: English
- Country of origin: United States

Bannon's War Room is a podcast hosted by American political strategist Steve Bannon since 2019. Natalie Winters is the show's White House correspondent and occasional co-host.

The website Podcharts regularly ranks the show among the top 10 political podcasts in the United States. A video version of the show airs on Real America's Voice.

== History ==
The first episode of War Room was released in October 2019. It is recorded in a basement studio near the United States Capitol for four hours a day, Monday through Friday with two hours recorded on Saturday.

In November 2020, the podcast was pulled from YouTube, Spotify, Twitter, and Facebook after Bannon called for the beheading of Anthony Fauci and Christopher A. Wray, the director of the FBI. On January 8, 2021, YouTube removed the War Room account after Rudy Giuliani, while appearing on one episode, blamed Democrats for the January 6, 2021 attack on the United States Capitol.

In February 2023, a study by the Brookings Institution concluded that the show was a leader in making "false, misleading and unsubstantiated statements."

In May 2024, after being fired from his own show on WABC, Rudy Giuliani became a frequent guest on the show.

In July 2024, Bannon live-cast the podcast from several locations around Danbury, Connecticut near the low-security prison where he was to serve out his four month sentence for contempt of Congress. He stated the show would continue while he was in prison with several guest hosts. Bannon left prison one week before Election Day, November 5, 2024. Immediately after his predawn release he went to a remote studio to tape an episode of War Room.

After the election, Bannon used the podcast to voice his concerns about the relationship between Elon Musk and Donald Trump and Musk's, according to Bannon, "techno-feudalist" ideas.
