= The Weather Cast =

Television channel

The WeatherCast
- Country: United States
- Broadcast area: Nationwide (available exclusively to Dish Network subscribers)

Programming
- Picture format: 480i (SDTV); 1080i (HDTV)

Ownership
- Owner: WeatherNation/Dish Network

History
- Launched: May 20, 2010
- Closed: May 24, 2010 (replaced by WeatherNation TV)
- Replaced by: WeatherNation TV

The Weather Cast was a television channel seen exclusively on Dish Network. The channel was devoted solely to weather forecasts from across the United States, and was a direct competitor to The Weather Channel (owned by NBC Universal, Bain Capital, and Blackstone Group). The service was owned by Minneapolis-based WeatherNation The channel was operated for only four days.

== Background ==
The channel launched on Dish Network channel 213 on May 20, 2010. The next day, on May 21, 2010, Dish Network announced that it would be eliminating The Weather Channel from its lineups in favor of The Weather Cast, citing rights fees (The Weather Channel requested a rate increase from 11 cents per subscriber to 12 cents, a nine percent increase, totalling $140,000 per month for all Dish subscribers) and The Weather Channel's decision to move toward movies and other entertainment programming.

Dish Network and The Weather Channel reached an agreement to continue carriage of The Weather Channel on May 24, 2010, even though Dish's concerns about programming remained only partially addressed (the Friday-night movie that was particularly unpopular with viewers was removed, but instead replaced with more entertainment programming). This agreement led to the discontinuation of The Weather Cast, making it one of the shortest-lived television channels in history. The agreement also led to The Weather Channel to produce a local Weatherscan-style weather information channel for Dish Network, as this advisory indicated on The Weather Cast's channel after its demise:

The Weather Cast is no longer available. Coming soon... Your local weather information from Dish Network and The Weather Channel. The most accurate information all the time for your city and region.

At 5:30 P.M. Eastern Time, the screen was replaced with a message saying this:

Coming soon! DISH Network and The Weather Channel are proud to announce the upcoming launch of a new TWC channel dedicated to your local weather. Stay tuned for the most accurate, up-to-the-minute weather information for your city and region! At this time The Weather Cast is no longer available.

As of June 1, 2010, DISH Network channel 213 was off the air, with no indication when or if the locally based TWC channel would launch. 213 would later be replaced by WEATI (The Weather Channel's interactive program).

On March 30, 2011, WeatherNation announced that they will be relaunching their national weather TV network, now as WeatherNation TV.
