= WeatherNation TV =

American television network

- Country: United States, Caribbean
- Broadcast area: Nationwide
- Headquarters: Centennial, Colorado

Programming
- Language: English
- Picture format: 1080i (HDTV); 480i (SDTV; widescreen)

Ownership
- Owner: Robert J. Sigg
- Parent: Performance One Media LLC
- Sister channels: Real America's Voice

History
- Launched: October 27, 2011; 14 years ago
- Founder: Paul Douglas
- Replaced: WeatherCast
- Former names: WeatherNational, WeatherTV, WeatherNation TV, The Weather Network and LifeMinute.tv

Links
- Webcast: Live stream
- Website: weathernationtv.com

Availability

Terrestrial
- Available on television stations in some markets via digital subchannels: See list of affiliates

WeatherNation TV (branded on-air as simply WeatherNation) is an American broadcast, digital streaming, cable, and satellite television network owned by WeatherNation, Inc, a subsidiary of Performance One Media and ultimately owned by Robert J. Sigg. The network broadcasts live and pre-recorded local, regional, and national weather forecasts and weather-related news, including periodic coverage of severe and tropical weather events. The network's studio facilities, along with its headquarters and master control facilities are located in the Denver suburb of Centennial, Colorado, sharing production facilities with sister network Real America's Voice.

== History ==
WeatherNation was founded by Minneapolis–Saint Paul-based meteorologist Paul Douglas in 2010. Robert J. Sigg's Performance One Media in 2010 acquired the WeatherNation trademarks and brand from the original WeatherNation (which eventually became part of AerisWeather), a centralized weather service for local stations and web sites. Broadcast Weather also was hired to provide weather news programming for WeatherNation channel. In March 2011, WeatherNation, Inc. and National Cable Television Cooperative (NCTC) reached a long-term carriage agreement for a national channel for a second quarter 2011 roll out. Performance One Media later gained full ownership and control over WeatherNation following a lawsuit against it in 2014.

WeatherNation would gain its first broadcast television outlet by October 24, 2011, WHDT in Stuart, Florida, as its primary affiliation. WIYC in Montgomery, Alabama, also started carrying WeatherNation that same month. Further expansion of its broadcast affiliate body continued in January 2012, when WeatherNation added affiliates in Minneapolis, Minnesota (KARE-TV); Little Rock, Arkansas (KMYA-DT); Fort Smith, Arkansas (KFDF-CA); and Springfield, Missouri (KFFS-CA).

Many of WeatherNation TV's initial over-the-air affiliates were low-power and full-power stations that were not affiliated with one of the major broadcast television networks. However, from 2012 to 2014, the network announced piecemeal agreements with two major broadcasting groups to carry WeatherNation on the subchannels of network-affiliated stations (including one which expanded upon an existing affiliation agreement with such a station). During 2013 and 2014, the network expanded its distribution agreement with the Gannett Company, owner of Minneapolis affiliate KARE-TV, to add the network on the subchannels of its stations in cities such as Atlanta (WXIA-TV), Denver (KUSA), and Washington, D.C. (WUSA). On October 27, 2014, WeatherNation TV signed an affiliation agreement with the Sinclair Broadcast Group to carry its programming on a subchannel of the company's flagship station, WBFF in Baltimore.

On January 14, 2014, WeatherNation launched on DirecTV channel 361 as part of a carriage dispute between The Weather Channel and DirecTV. On April 21, 2015, Dish Network announced that it had reached an agreement to add WeatherNation onto its lineup, making it available on channel 215. On August 1, 2018, DirecTV dropped WeatherNation.

On October 12, 2022, Procter & Gamble announced it would no longer air advertising on either Performance One network due to the overtly political programming of sister network Real America's Voice.

== Availability ==
=== Current affiliates ===
List of WeatherNation TV affiliates
Media market	State	Station	Channel
Fresno	California	KVHF-LD9	4.9
Cortez	Colorado	K18DR-D5	24.5
Boise	Idaho	KRID-LD10	22.10
Twin Falls	Idaho	KBAX-LD8	27.8
Kansas City	Kansas	KCKS-LD6	25.6
Kansas City	Kansas	KMJC-LD6	25.6
Topeka	Kansas	WROB-LD6	25.6
Wichita	Kansas	KAGW-CD10	26.10
Salisbury	Maryland	WGDV-LD	32.1
Branson	Missouri	KYCW-LD2	3.2
Lake Ozark	Missouri	KRMS-LD9	32.9
Manteo	North Carolina	W24EC-D	24.1
Atlantic City	New Jersey	WSJT-LD6	15.6
Albuquerque–Santa Fe	New Mexico	KNMQ-LD7	20.7
Toledo	Ohio	WTVG-DT7	13.7
Cottage Grove	Oregon	K18LR-D7	18.7
Pittsburgh	Pennsylvania	WBPA-LD10	12.10
Nashville	Tennessee	WNSH-LD	9.2
Lubbock	Texas	KJTV-CD2	32.2

=== Pay television ===
WeatherNation TV's national feed began to be carried on satellite provider DirecTV on channel 361 on December 16, 2013; the provider reached a temporary carriage agreement with the network while it was renegotiating its contract with The Weather Channel (which was carried on channel 362). After DirecTV dropped The Weather Channel on January 14, 2014, due to the reasons behind Dish Network's planned removal of the channel in May 2010, the provider replaced The Weather Channel on channel 362 with WeatherNation, which lasted until The Weather Channel and DirecTV struck a new carriage agreement on April 8, 2014, that restored TWC on channel 362; however, WeatherNation TV would continue to be carried on channel 361 until 2018 as a result of a long-term carriage agreement it signed with DirecTV on April 2, one week prior to The Weather Channel agreement.

On April 21, 2015, WeatherNation reached an agreement with Dish Network to be offered to its customers as a six-week preview, and then added to Dish's America's Top 120 programming packages.

On August 1, 2018, DirecTV dropped its carriage of WeatherNation, replacing it with the AccuWeather Network.

Digicel Play added WeatherNation in September 2016 to its channel lineup in Dominica, Turks and Caicos, and Jamaica; it is available on channel #514.

=== Over-the-top providers ===
Pluto TV added WeatherNation in December 2018.
