= Vilho Väisälä =

Finnish meteorologist and physicist (1889–1969)

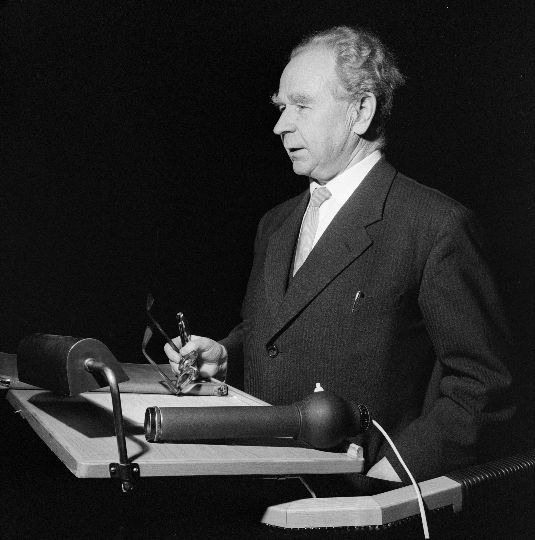
- Born: September 28, 1889
- Died: August 12, 1969 (aged 79); Helsinki, Finland
- Known for: Brunt–Väisälä frequency
- Awards: Commander of the Order of the White Rose of Finland (1946)
- Scientific career
- Fields: meteorology physics
- Institutions: Vaisala Oyj; Finnish Meteorological Institute; University of Helsinki
- Thesis: Ensimmäisen lajin elliptisen integralin käänteisfunktion yksikäsitteisyys (The single-valuedness of the inverse function of the elliptic integral of the first kind)

Vilho Väisälä (Finnish pronunciation: [ˈʋilho ˈʋæi̯sælæ]; September 28, 1889 – August 12, 1969) was a Finnish meteorologist and physicist, and founder of Vaisala Oyj.

== Career ==
After graduation in mathematics in 1912, Väisälä worked for the Finnish Meteorological Institute in aerological measurements, specializing in the research of the higher troposphere. At the time the measurements were conducted by attaching a thermograph to a kite.

In 1917 he published his dissertation in mathematics Ensimmäisen lajin elliptisen integralin käänteisfunktion yksikäsitteisyys (The single-valuedness of the inverse function of the elliptic integral of the first kind). His dissertation was the first and still is the only mathematical doctoral thesis written in the Finnish language.

Väisälä participated in development of radiosonde, a device attached to a balloon and launched to measure air in the higher atmosphere. In 1936 he started his own company, manufacturing radiosondes and — later — other meteorological instruments.

In 1948 Väisälä was nominated a Professor of Meteorology in the University of Helsinki.

== Personal life ==
Vilho Väisälä's two brothers, Kalle Väisälä and Yrjö Väisälä, also made successful careers in science.

Vilho Väisälä knew Esperanto, and played an active role in the Esperanto movement. During the World Congress of Esperanto of 1969, which was held in Helsinki shortly before his death, he served as the rector of the so-called Internacia Kongresa Universitato ("International Congressual University"), and coordinated the specialistic lectures in Esperanto given by various academicians to the congressists.

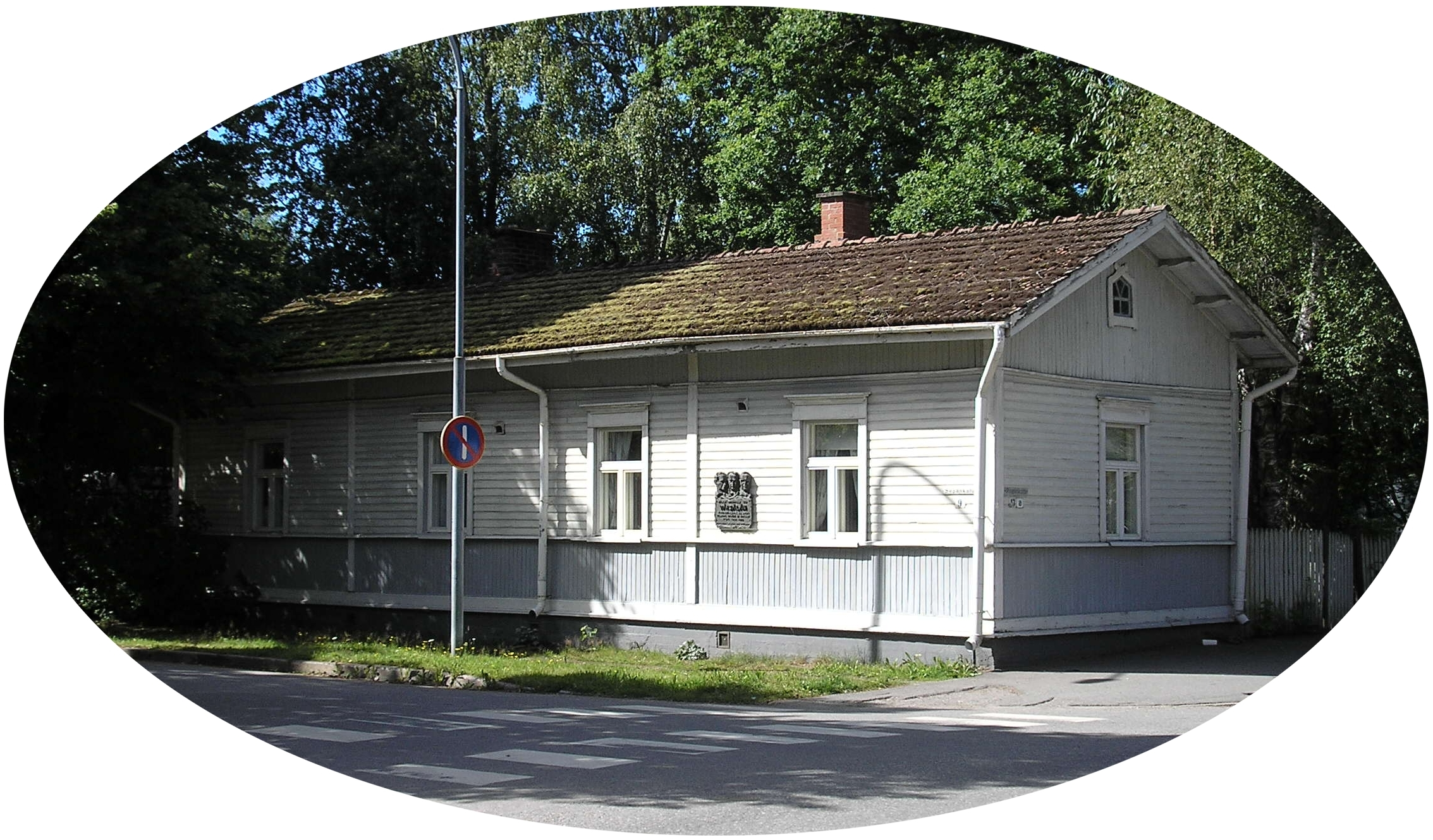
An early 20th century wooden house in Joensuu at the corner of Sepänkatu and Papinkatu streets. The building was Väisälä brothers' home in 1904–19.

== See also ==
- Brunt–Väisälä frequency
