= Väisälä (crater) =

Crater on the Moon

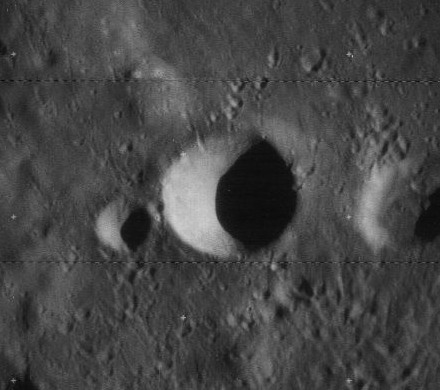
- Lunar crater Väisälä as seen by Lunar Orbiter 4 in 1967
- Coordinates: 25.90°N 47.90°W
- Diameter: 8.12 km (5.05 mi)
- Depth: unknown
- Colongitude: 48° at sunrise
- Eponym: Yrjö Väisälä

Väisälä is a tiny lunar impact crater located on a rise in the Oceanus Procellarum. Sharing the same continental island are the brilliant crater Aristarchus to the south-southeast and Herodotus to the south-southwest. Väisälä lies just to the west of the Rupes Toscanelli fault line, and the Rimae Aristarchus rille system. To the southwest is the notable Vallis Schröteri cleft.

== Appearance ==
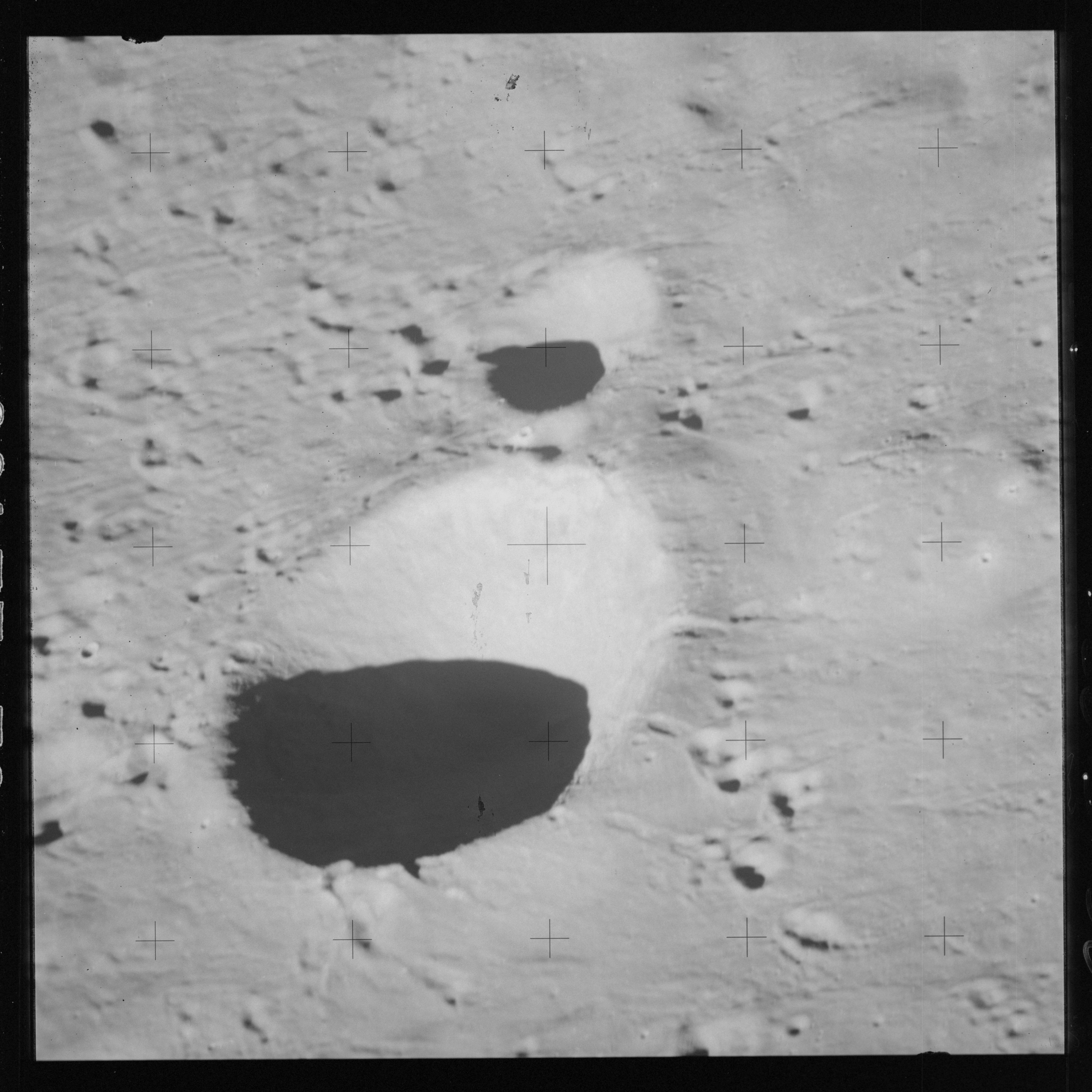
Oblique view from Apollo 15

This formation is circular and cup-shaped, with a higher albedo than the surrounding dark surface. It was previously designated Aristarchus A before being named after prolific Finnish astronomer Yrjö Väisälä by the IAU in 1973.

== See also ==
- 1573 Väisälä, minor planet
- 2804 Yrjö, minor planet
