= 1573 Väisälä =

Asteroid

Discovery
- Discovered by: S. Arend
- Discovery site: Uccle Obs.
- Discovery date: 27 October 1949

Designations
- Named after: Yrjö Väisälä (astronomer)
- Alternative designations: 1949 UA
- Minor planet category: main-belt · Phocaea

Orbital characteristics
- Epoch 4 September 2017 (JD 2458000.5)
- Uncertainty parameter 0
- Observation arc: 67.51 yr (24,659 days)
- Aphelion: 2.9192 AU
- Perihelion: 1.8243 AU
- Semi-major axis: 2.3717 AU
- Eccentricity: 0.2308
- Orbital period (sidereal): 3.65 yr (1,334 days)
- Mean anomaly: 225.00°
- Mean motion: 0° 16^{m} 11.28^{s} / day
- Inclination: 24.553°
- Longitude of ascending node: 202.38°
- Argument of perihelion: 173.91°

Physical characteristics
- Dimensions: 8.43±1.90 km 9.083±0.055 km 9.146±0.066 km 9.77 km (IRAS:2)
- Synodic rotation period: 252 h (Note: Pravec (2012) web: rotation period 252 hours with a brightness amplitude of 0.76 mag. Pravec, P.; Wolf, M.; Sarounova, L. (2012) Summary figures at DEFPage_Local.php?AstInfo=1573%7CVaisala Collaborative Asteroid Lightcurve Link (CALL) for (1573) Vaisala)
- Geometric albedo: 0.2226 (IRAS:2); 0.25±0.12; 0.2818±0.0319; 0.284±0.045
- Spectral type: S
- Absolute magnitude (H): 12.2 · 12.30 · 12.47 · 12.84±0.50

1573 Väisälä, provisional designation 1949 UA, is a stony Phocaea asteroid, slow rotator and suspected tumbler from the inner regions of the asteroid belt, approximately 9 kilometers in diameter. It was discovered on 27 October 1949, by Belgian astronomer Sylvain Arend at the Royal Observatory of Belgium in Uccle, Belgium. It was named for Finnish astronomer Yrjö Väisälä.

== Orbit and classification ==
The stony S-type asteroid is a member of the Phocaea family (701), a group of asteroids with similar orbital characteristics. It orbits the Sun at a distance of 1.8–2.9 AU once every 3 years and 8 months (1,334 days). Its orbit has an eccentricity of 0.23 and an inclination of 25° with respect to the ecliptic. Väisälä's observation arc begins on the night following its official discovery observation at Uccle, as no precoveries were taken and no prior identifications were made.

== Physical characteristics ==
=== Slow rotator ===
In September 2011, a rotational lightcurve of Väisälä was obtained from photometric observations made by Czech astronomer Petr Pravec at Ondřejov Observatory. (Note: Light-Curve-Analysis of (1573) Väisälä Screenshot from data) Its analysis gave a rotation period of 252 hours with a brightness variation of 0.76 magnitude (U=2). This makes Väisälä one of the Top 200 slow rotators known to exist. The body is also suspected to be in a non-principal axis rotation (NPAR), colloquially called as "tumbling". As of 2017, no follow-up observations have been made of these provisional results.

=== Diameter and albedo ===
According to the space-based surveys carried out by the Infrared Astronomical Satellite IRAS, and NASA's Wide-field Infrared Survey Explorer with its subsequent NEOWISE mission, Väisälä measures between 8.43 and 9.77 kilometers in diameter, and its surface has an albedo between 0.222 and 0.284. The Collaborative Asteroid Lightcurve Link adopts the results obtained by IRAS, that is, an albedo of 0.2226 and a diameter of 9.77 kilometers using on an absolute magnitude of 12.30.

== Naming ==
This minor planet was named after Finnish astronomer, Yrjö Väisälä (1891–1971), a prolific discoverer of minor planets during the late 1930s and early 1940s. In addition, a second minor planet, 2804 Yrjö, was named in his honor by pioneering Finnish female astronomer Liisi Oterma, and the lunar crater Väisälä also bears his name. The official naming citation was published by the Minor Planet Center on 31 January 1962 (M.P.C. 2116).
