= Vaisala =

Finnish technology company making measuring instruments

Vaisala Oyj

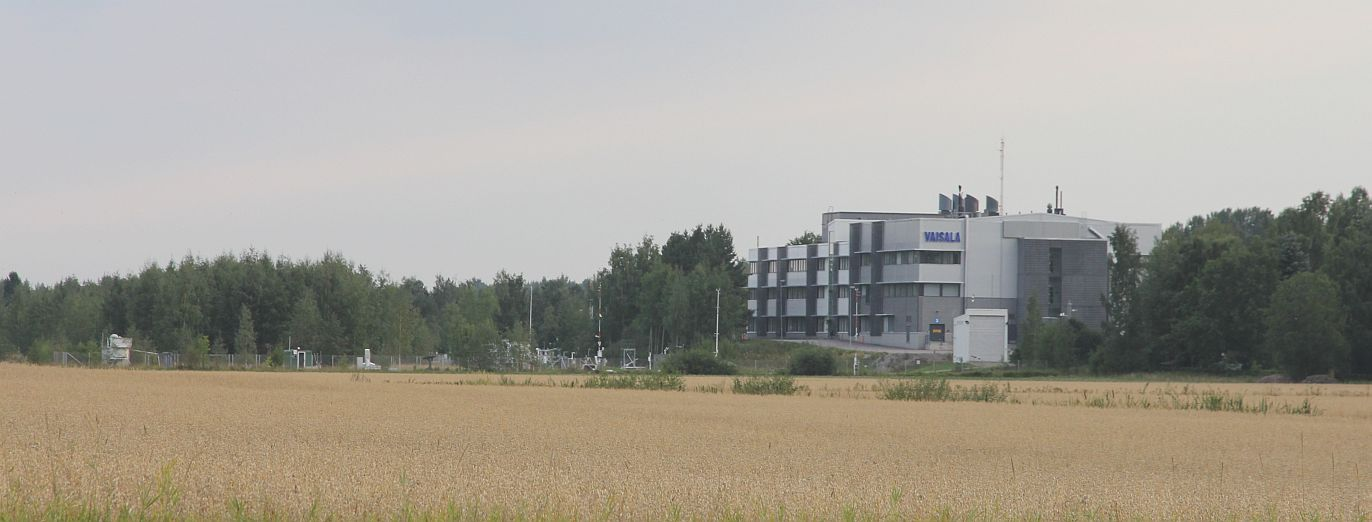
- Vaisala headquarters in Vantaa
- Type: Julkinen osakeyhtiö
- Traded as: Nasdaq Helsinki: VAIAS
- Founded: 1936; 90 years ago Vantaa, Finland (as Mittari)
- Founder: Vilho Väisälä
- Headquarters: Vantaa, Finland
- Area served: 150+ countries
- Key people: Kai Öistämö, President and CEO
- Products: Weather and industrial measurement products and services
- Revenue: ▲€596.9 million (2025)
- Operating income: ▲€85.1 million (2025)
- Net income: ▼€59.8 million (2025)
- Total assets: ▼€588.9 million (2025)
- Total equity: ▲€325.9 million (2025)
- Number of employees: over 2,400 (2025)
- Subsidiaries: Veriteq Instruments Inc., Sigmet Corp., 3TIER Inc., Second Wind Systems Inc., Vionice, Leosphere SAS, K-Patents
- Website: www.vaisala.com

Vaisala Oyj (Finnish pronunciation: [ˈʋɑi̯sɑlɑ]) is a Finnish company that produces products and services for environmental and industrial measurement.

Their major customer groups and markets are national meteorological and hydrological services, aviation authorities, defense forces, road authorities, the weather critical energy sector, life science and high-technology industries, and building automation.

Vaisala had over 2,400 employees and net sales of €596.9 million in 2025. Vaisala serves customers in more than 150 countries.

The parent company Vaisala Oyj, domicile in Vantaa, Finland, is listed on the NASDAQ OMX Helsinki. Vaisala Group has offices and operations in Finland, the United States, Australia, Brazil, Canada, China, France, Germany, India, Italy, Japan, Kenya, Malaysia, México, South Korea, Sweden, United Arab Emirates, and the United Kingdom.

== History ==
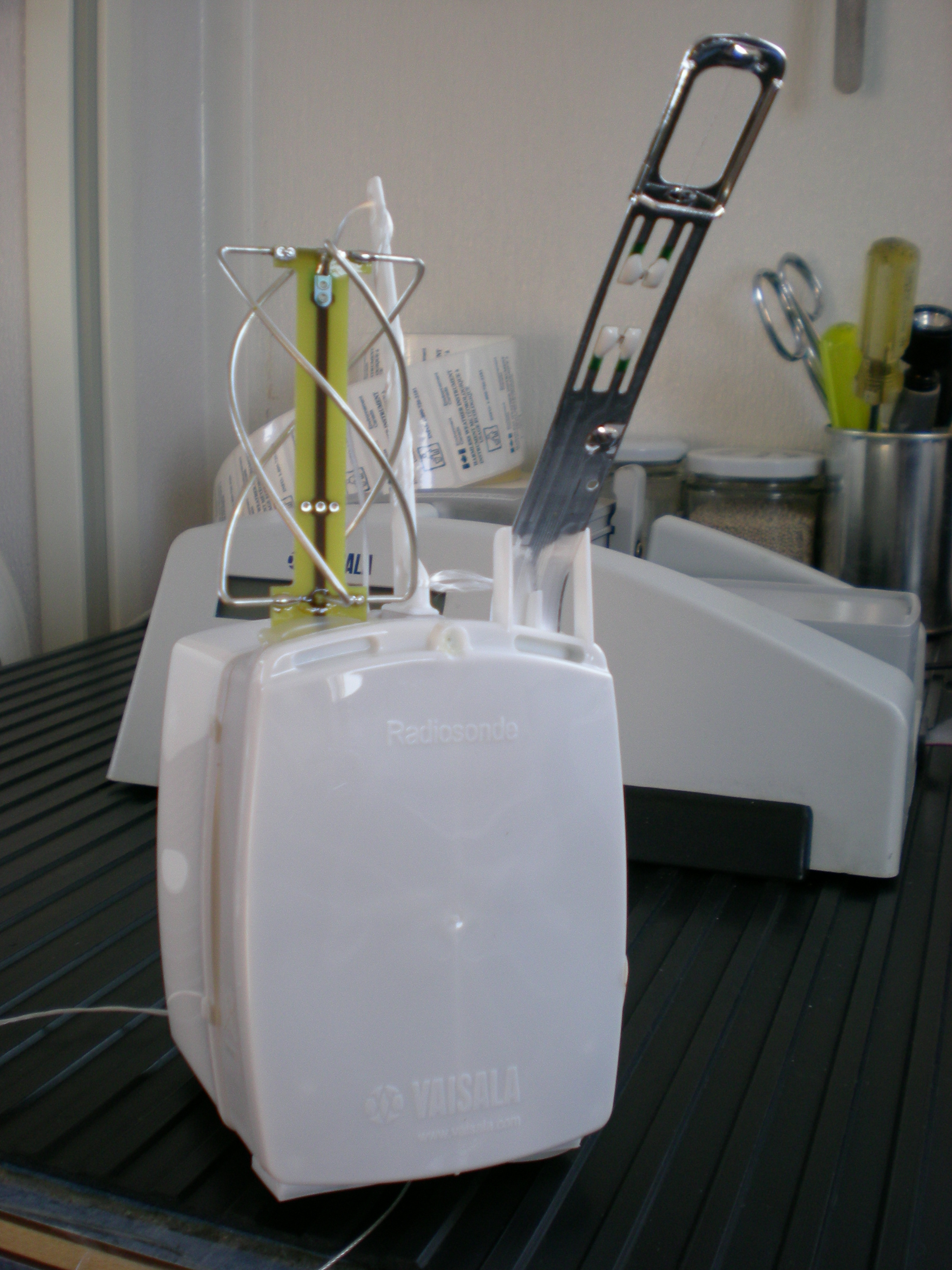
A GPS sonde (RS92), approx 220 × 80 × 75 mm (8.7 × 3.1 × 3 in)

Vaisala originated in the 1930s when Professor Vilho Väisälä (1889–1969), Vaisala's founder and long-time managing director, invented some of the operating principles of a radiosonde. He sent the first Finnish radiosonde aloft in December 1931. After the first sounding, Väisälä continued with further development and tests until a radiosonde could be brought into production and deliveries started in 1936. From the very start, Vaisala was an international business, exporting 95 percent of the production. As the Vaisala radiosonde received international recognition, the demand for them increased. In 1944, Prof. Väisälä established a company called Mittari Oy ("Gauge Incorporated") and set up manufacturing facilities for radiosonde systems. The first sounding system included a semi-automatic radiosonde receiver, a calibration device, and a ground check set. The company employed 13 people at the time. Later, in 1955, the name of Mittari was changed to Vaisala.

From a modest start, the company expanded into multiple measurement fields, including humidity, pressure, and wind measurement. At the end of 1954, a modern manufacturing plant was relocated in Vantaa. Since then, the headquarters have been expanded several times and Vaisala's product range has been diversified and expanded greatly. Nowadays Vaisala employs over 2,400 people and serves customers in over 150 countries.

=== Commercial production since 1936 ===
After the first sounding, Väisälä continued with further development and tests until a radiosonde could be brought into commercial production. Radiosonde deliveries started with the RS11 (1936–). Amongst its first customers was the Massachusetts Institute of Technology. In 1937, Väisälä's radiosonde won a gold medal at the World Fair in Paris.

=== Recovering from the wars ===
World War II, the Finnish Winter War 1939–1940, and the Finnish Continuation War 1941–1944 disrupted many lives and upset business and delivery activities internationally. The post-war decades witnessed a strenuous effort to revive the national and international economies. Vaisala grew to employ 60 people in 1954. The first issue of Vaisala News magazine was published in 1959. Thanks to major product development efforts, during the 1950s and 1960s, the Vaisala Sounding System became completely electronic, the first automatic radiosonde receiver and the world's first fully transistorized radiosonde RS13 (1965–) were introduced, and the first weather satellite image receiver was delivered. Yrjö Toivola took over as the managing director of the company when Professor Vilho Väisälä died in 1969.

=== 1970s-1980s ===
The 1970s and 1980s were busy decades for Vaisala. Thin-film technology was developed for Vaisala HUMICAP® relative humidity sensors - the first in the world. The Vaisala CORA Automatic Sounding System - along with automatic weather stations, road weather stations and aviation weather systems – was introduced. In 1975, Vaisala employed over 200 people. During the 1980s, numerous new offices were established to ensure the company's ability to serve customers worldwide – in the UK, Japan, USA, Germany, and Australia. A traffic weather company was also acquired in the UK. Vaisala's first cleanroom was built to enable the design and manufacture of semiconductors in-house. Vaisala BAROCAP® barometric pressure sensor technology was introduced, as well as a new radiosonde family - the Vaisala Radiosonde RS80 (1981–2008). These units made use of a water-activated wet battery that had a very long storage life and high power density but a limited working life. The Professor Vilho Väisälä Award was established in cooperation with the WMO, to stimulate interest in meteorological research involving meteorological observation methods and instruments.

The radiosondes have also been used in many upper air ozone research studies using an attached detector that had the sensor data multiplexed with the standard meteorology dataset. GPS positioning information was added to gain more accurate wind speed information.

=== New millennium ===
CEO Pekka Ketonen was appointed in 1992. The company was listed on the Helsinki Exchanges in 1994. By then, it employed over 600 people. Further product developments included the introduction of GPS technology for upper air wind measurement, the Vaisala CARBOCAP CO_{2} sensor, and Vaisala DRYCAP sensor technology for industrial dewpoint measurement. New offices were established in France and China, and business acquisitions in aviation weather and surface weather further enhanced Vaisala's presence in the USA.

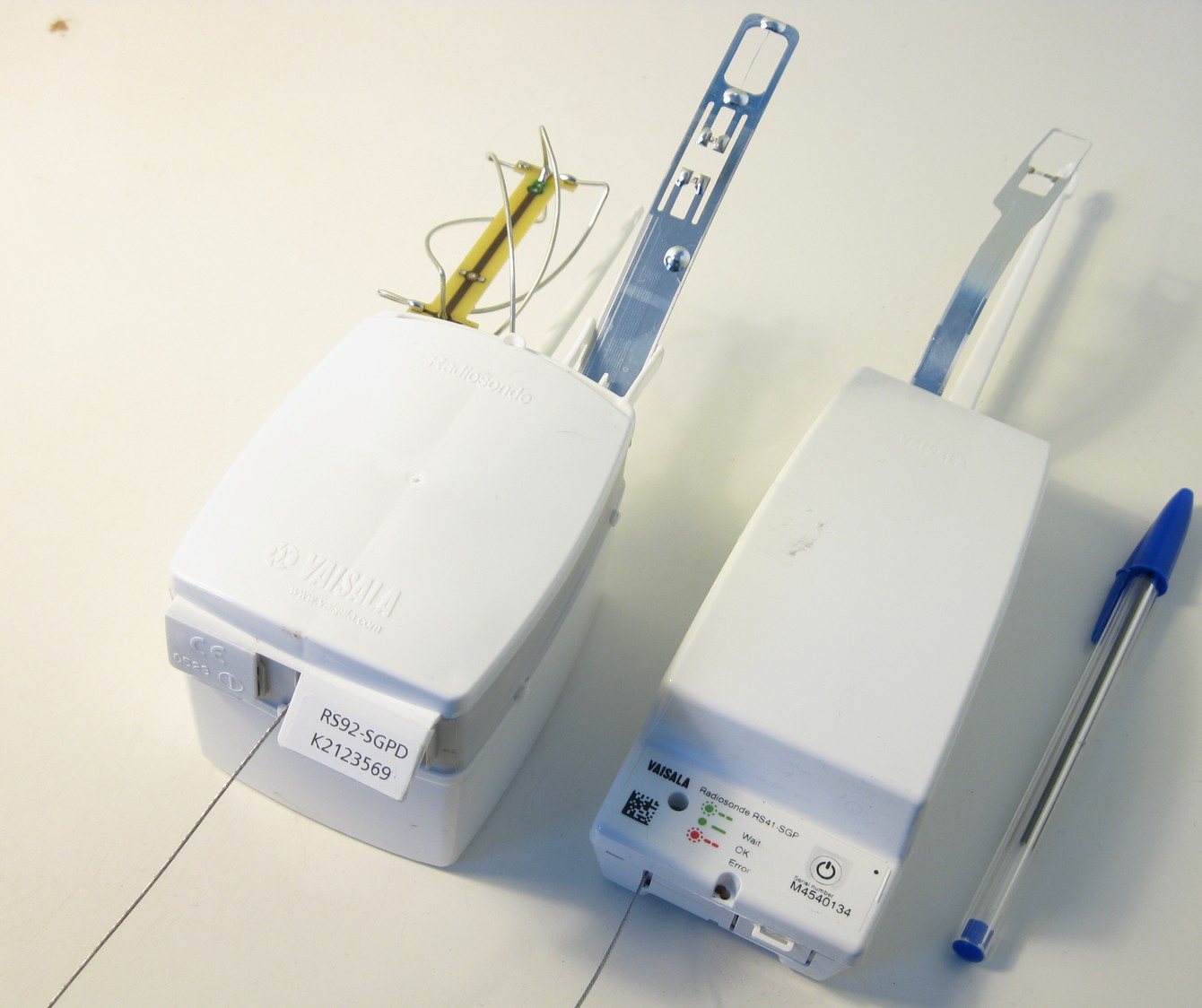
Vaisala RS92-SGPD (left) and its successor, the RS41-SGP (right).

The new millennium was kicked off with yet more business acquisitions - in wind profiling, lightning detection, and aviation weather. U.S. manufacturing operations were concentrated in Boulder, Colorado. New product launches included a new radiosonde product family - the Vaisala Radiosonde RS92 (2003 - in production), as well as the Vaisala Weather Transmitter, a single instrument measuring six weather parameters. The device used standard consumer batteries, a change from earlier models.

CEO Ketonen retired on October 1, 2006. Vaisala's board of directors appointed Kjell Forsén the new company CEO. Forsén last served as president of Ericsson Finland before joining Vaisala on September 18, 2006. As of October 2020, Vaisala's President and CEO is Kai Öistämö.

Vaisala technology has played a part in space exploration for some 60 years, for instance the Mars Rover Curiosity, Mars Rover Perseverance and Schiaparelli EDM lander contain pressure and humidity sensors manufactured by Vaisala.

With new developments in miniaturization, communications, and sensors a new radiosonde the model RS41 (2014 – in production) was announced. This model had made improvements in specifications. Launch preparation made simple with the RI41 ground check device. It is smaller and has pre-flight dry-point humidity sensor calibration achieved by heating the sensor to drive off contaminants. It is also available in a model (RS41-SG) without a pressure sensor, the pressure reading is derived from the GPS altitude, temperature and humidity readings.

In September 2022, the Group launched Vaisala Xweather to provide environmental forecast and observation data services for businesses and developers. It is one of the company's main platforms for subscription-based weather and environmental data services, and combines measurement data with AI-based modelling.

== History of acquisitions and divestments ==
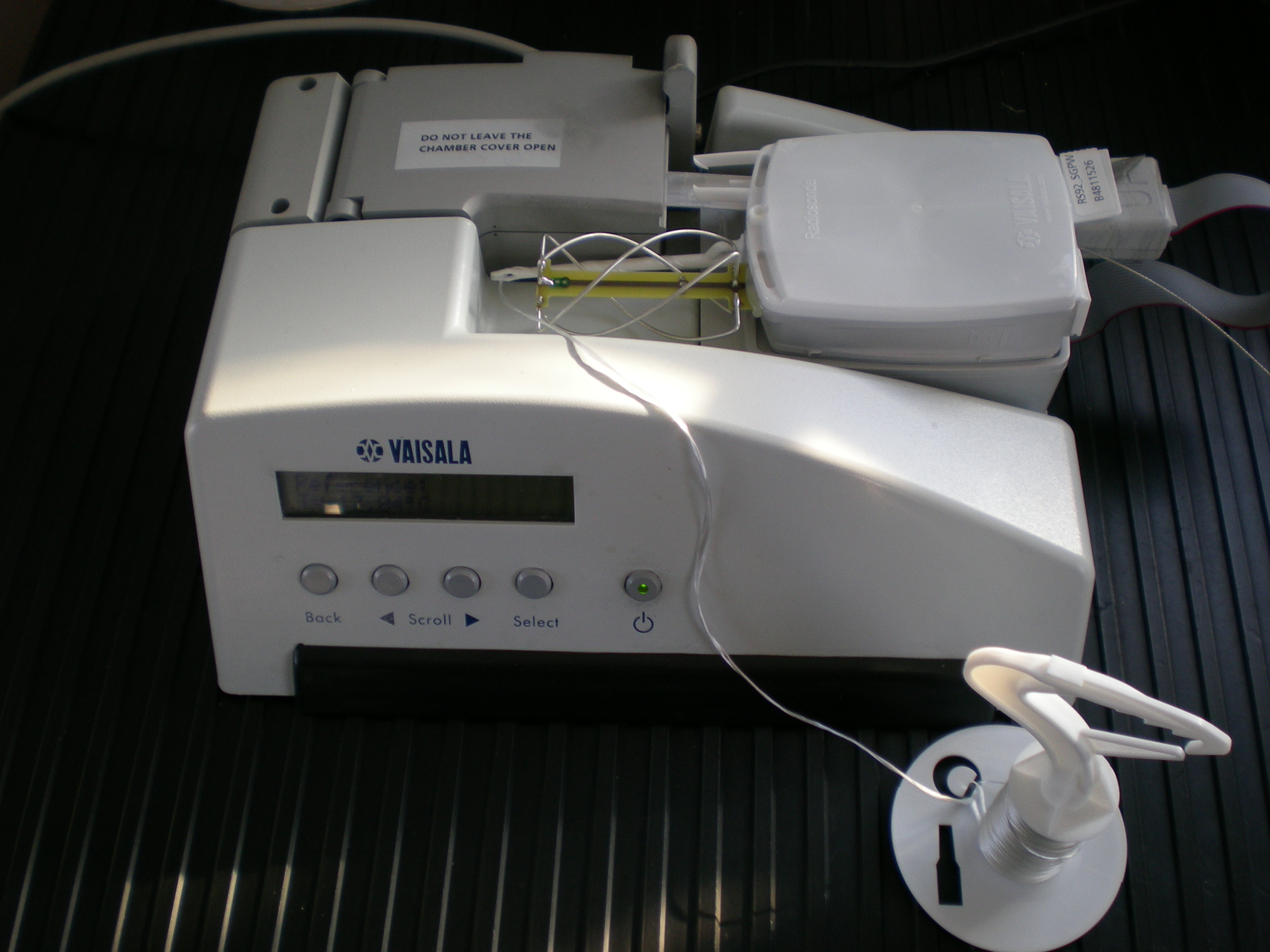
GPS radiosonde (RS92) in-ground check set (GC25), used to perform a 'ground check' and also recondition the humidity sensor

The Vaisala Group strives for global market and product leadership in selected business areas The goal is achieved mainly by organic growth and supplemented by corporate acquisitions.

=== 1980s ===
- 1985: the Group acquired Tycho Technologies Inc. of USA, manufacturer of upper air wind profiler.
- August 1989: the Group acquired the British Thermal Mapping International Ltd. of the United Kingdom. Thermal Mapping specializes in measuring the thermal characteristics of roads and runways and in providing forecast models.

=== 1990s ===
- June 1995: the Group sold Vaisala Technologies Inc. to Breed Technologies Inc. of USA. Vaisala Technologies Inc. (VTI) manufactured silicon capacitive sensors for the car industry.
- July 1996: the Group acquired Artais Weather Check Inc. of USA.
- March 1999: the Group acquired AIR Inc. of USA.
- October 1999: the Group acquired Handar Inc. of USA.

=== 2000s ===
- February 2000: the Group acquired Dimension SA of France.
- October 2000: The Group acquired Jenoptik Impulsphysik GmbH of Germany.
- June 2001: the Group acquired the Meteorological Systems Unit of Radian International LLC of USA.
- March 2002: the Group acquired Global Atmospherics Inc. of Tucson, Arizona, USA.
- July 2005: the Group acquired CLH Inc. of Minneapolis, Minnesota, USA.
- January 2006: the Group acquired Sigmet Corporation of Westford, Massachusetts, USA.
- January 2009: the Group acquired Aviation System Maintenance Inc. (ASMI), Kansas, USA.
- December 2009: the Group acquired Quixote Transportation Technologies (QTT), a subsidiary of Quixote Corporation.

=== 2010s ===
- March 2010: the Group acquired Veriteq Instruments Inc. of Vancouver, BC, Canada
- August 2013: the Group acquired remote sensing manufacturer Second Wind Systems Inc. of Somerville, Massachusetts.
- December 2013: the Group acquired 3TIER, Inc., a renewable energy assessment and forecasting services company, headquartered in Seattle, Washington.
- October 2017: Vaisala acquired Vionice, a Finnish IT company specialized in computer vision and artificial intelligence.
- October 2018: Vaisala acquired all the shares in Leosphere SAS, a French company specializing in developing, manufacturing and servicing turnkey wind lidar instruments for wind energy, aviation, meteorology, and air quality.
- December 2018: Vaisala acquired Finnish K-Patents, a pioneer in in-line liquid measurements for industrial applications.
- August 2019: Vaisala announced acquisition of Professional Business-to-Business Weather Services from Foreca.

=== 2020s ===
- January 2022: Vaisala acquired Whether or Knot (AerisWeather), a U.S. company providing weather and environmental data services.
- October 2024: Vaisala acquired Nevis Technology Ltd, a British company that provides products, services and data portals for the offshore energy industry.
- October 2024: Vaisala acquired Speedwell Climate, a U.K. company specializing in data and software for weather risk transfer.
- December 2024: Vaisala acquired the WeatherDesk business from Maxar Technologies.
- September 2025: Vaisala acquired Quanterra, a U.K. company specializing in atmospheric monitoring of CO_{2} fluxes.
- June 2026: Vaisala announced the acquisition agreement of Atmo, Inc., a U.S. AI weather company. The acquisition is expected to close by the end of 2026.

== Vaisala business areas ==
Vaisala's business has been divided into three business areas: Weather and Environment, Industrial Measurements and Xweather.

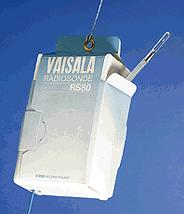
An earlier design radiosonde (RS80)

=== Weather and Environment ===
The Weather and Environment Business Area is divided into five business segments: Meteorology, Ground Transportation, Aviation, Renewable Energy, and Ambient Air Quality. The customers include meteorological institutes, airports and airlines, road and railroad authorities, renewable energy customers, maritime market segments, as well as defense forces.

=== Industrial Measurements ===
Industrial Measurements customers include multiple industries, including pharmaceutical, biotechnical, medical device, and drug distribution companies, as well as the power generation and transmission, maritime, automotive, semiconductor, electronics and building automation industries.

=== Xweather ===
Vaisala Xweather is a data and digital services business area that provides weather data and software solutions. It includes subscription-based data products and services like weather forecasts, road condition information and environmental monitoring. Customers use the services across industries like energy, aviation, finance and insurance.

== Products and services ==
=== Measurement Instruments ===
- Humidity and temperature measurement instruments
- Dewpoint measurement instruments
- Barometric pressure measurement instruments
- Carbon dioxide measurement instruments
- Moisture in oil measurement instruments
- Oxygen measurement instruments
- Wind measurement instruments
- Weather multi-sensor
- Optical weather instruments

=== Measurement Systems ===
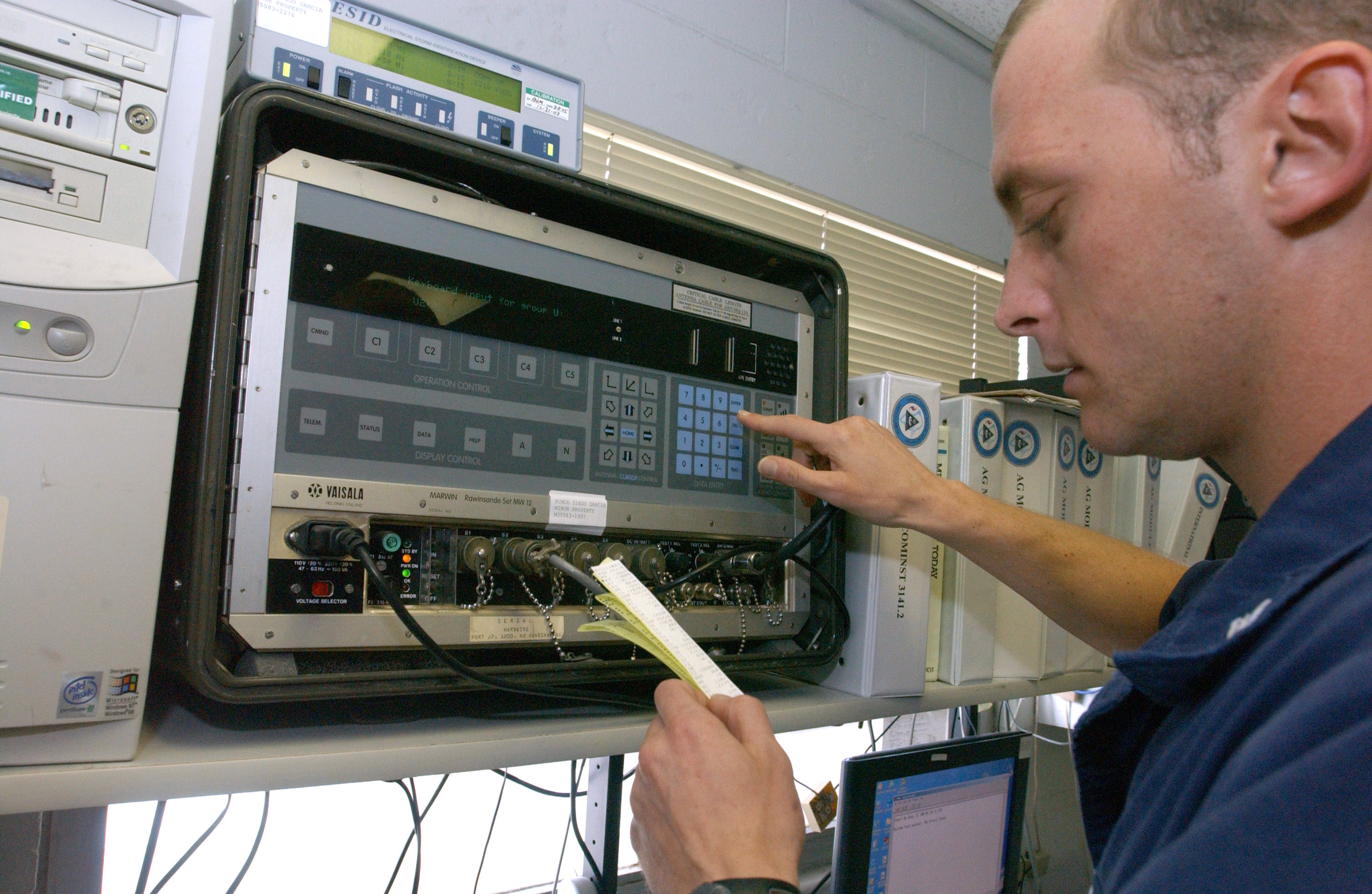
Vaisala Marwin Rawinsonde Set MW 12

- Radiosondes and sounding systems
- Dropsondes
- Surface weather systems
- Lightning detection systems
- Weather radars
- Wind profilers

=== Application and Services ===
- Aviation weather systems
- Traffic weather systems
- Meteorological and hydrological systems

=== Services and Data Subscription Services ===
- Customized applications, such as network operation, decision support services and tailored service packages
- Data through Vaisala's own observation network

=== Wind Energy Assessment Services and Remote Sensing Measurement ===
- Customized wind resource and energy assessment services for the wind industry, based on Numerical weather prediction (NWP). Services include due diligence assessments, energy production forecasts and consulting.
- Vaisala's Triton is a SODAR (Sonic Detection And Ranging) system designed for remote wind measurement in wind energy applications

== Awards and recognitions ==
Vaisala has received external recognition for its sustainability practices. In 2024, it was included in the TIME magazine's ranking of World's Best Companies - Sustainable Growth. It also got to the ranking again in 2025. Vaisala also received a gold medal from EcoVadis in 2024. Vaisala also sponsors and organizes awards. The Professor Vilho Väisälä award is presented every two years in cooperation with the World Meteorological Organization. In addition, Vaisala established a fund and together with the Finnish Academy of Science and Letters, a "Vaisala Prize", to recognize distinguished scientists in the active parts of their careers in mathematics and natural sciences. The first prize was given in 2000, and has been awarded annually since then.
