= Brunt–Väisälä frequency =

Measure of fluid stability against vertical displacement

In atmospheric dynamics, oceanography, asteroseismology and geophysics, the Brunt–Väisälä frequency, or buoyancy frequency, is a measure of the stability of a fluid to vertical displacements such as those caused by convection. More precisely it is the frequency at which a vertically displaced parcel will oscillate within a statically stable environment. It is named after David Brunt and Vilho Väisälä. It can be used as a measure of atmospheric stratification.

== Derivation for a general fluid ==
Consider a parcel of water or gas that has density $\rho_0$. This parcel is in an environment of other water or gas particles where the density of the environment is a function of height: $\rho = \rho (z)$. If the parcel is displaced by an infinitesimally small vertical increment $z'$, and it maintains its original density so that its volume does not change, it will be subject to an extra gravitational force against its surroundings of:

$$\rho_0 \frac{\partial^2 z'}{\partial t^2} = - g \left[\rho (z)-\rho (z+z')\right]$$

where $g$ is the gravitational acceleration, and is defined to be positive. We distribute the negative preceding the substitution of the linear approximation:

$$\rho (z+z') - \rho (z) = \frac{\partial \rho (z)}{\partial z} z'$$

and then dividing $\rho_0$ to the RHS, giving:
$$\frac{\partial^2 z'}{\partial t^2} = \frac{g}{\rho_0} \frac{\partial \rho (z)}{\partial z} z'$$

The above second-order differential equation has the following solution:

$$z' = z'_0 e^{i N t}$$

where the Brunt–Väisälä frequency $N$ is:

$$N = \sqrt{- \frac{g}{\rho_0} \frac{\partial \rho (z)}{\partial z}}$$

For negative $\frac{\partial \rho (z)}{\partial z}$, the displacement $z'$ has oscillating solutions (and N gives our angular frequency). If it is positive, then there is run away growth – i.e. the fluid is statically unstable.

== In meteorology and astrophysics ==
For a gas parcel, the density will only remain fixed as assumed in the previous derivation if the pressure, $P$, is constant with height, which is not true in an atmosphere confined by gravity. Instead, the parcel will expand adiabatically as the pressure declines. Therefore, a more general formulation used in meteorology is:

$$N \equiv \sqrt{\frac{g}{\theta} \frac{d\theta}{dz}},$$
where $\theta$ is potential temperature, $g$ is the local acceleration of gravity, and $z$ is geometric height.

Since $\theta = T (P_0/P)^{R/c_P}$, where $P_0$ is a constant reference pressure, for a perfect gas this expression is equivalent to:
$$N^2 \equiv g\left(\frac{1}{T}\frac{dT}{dz} - \frac{R}{c_P}\frac{1}{P}\frac{dP}{dz}\right) = g \left(\frac{1}{T}\frac{dT}{dz} - \frac{\gamma - 1}{\gamma}\frac{1}{P}\frac{dP}{dz}\right),$$
where in the last form $\gamma = c_P/c_V$, the adiabatic index. Using the ideal gas law, we can eliminate the temperature to express $N^2$ in terms of pressure and density:
$$N^2 \equiv g\left(\frac{1}{\gamma}\frac{1}{P}\frac{dP}{dz} - \frac{1}{\rho}\frac{d\rho}{dz}\right) = g\left(\frac{1}{\gamma}\frac{d\ln P}{dz} - \frac{d\ln\rho}{dz}\right).$$

This version is in fact more general than the first, as it applies when the chemical composition of the gas varies with height, and also for imperfect gases with variable adiabatic index, in which case $\gamma \equiv \gamma_{01}= \left(\frac{\partial \ln P}{\partial \ln \rho}\right)_{S}$, i.e. the derivative is taken at constant entropy, $S$.

If a gas parcel is pushed up and $N^2>0$, the air parcel will move up and down around the height where the density of the parcel matches the density of the surrounding air. If the air parcel is pushed up and $N^2=0$, the air parcel will not move any further. If the air parcel is pushed up and $N^2<0$, (i.e. the Brunt–Väisälä frequency is imaginary), then the air parcel will rise and rise unless $N^2$ becomes positive or zero again further up in the atmosphere. In practice this leads to convection, and hence the Schwarzschild criterion for stability against convection (or the Ledoux criterion if there is compositional stratification) is equivalent to the statement that $N^2$ should be positive.

The Brunt–Väisälä frequency commonly appears in the thermodynamic equations for the atmosphere and in the structure of stars.

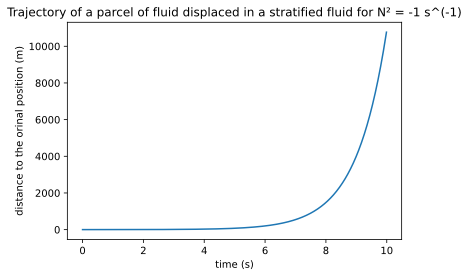
Trajectory of a parcel of fluid displaced by 1m in an unstably stratified fluid of Brunt-Väisälä frequency N^{2} = −1/s^{2}

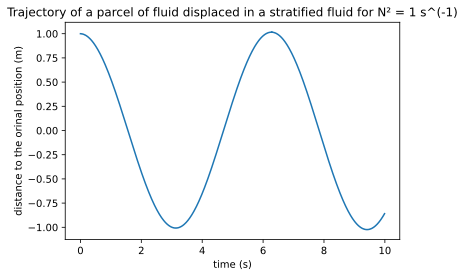
Oscillations of a parcel of fluid initially displaced by 1m in a stably stratified fluid with Brunt-Väisälä frequency N = 1/s.

== In oceanography ==
In the ocean where salinity is important, or in fresh water lakes near freezing, where density is not a linear function of temperature:
$$N\equiv \sqrt{-\frac{g}{\rho} \frac{d\rho}{dz}}$$
where $\rho$, the potential density, depends on both temperature and salinity. An example of Brunt–Väisälä oscillation in a density stratified liquid can be observed in the 'Magic Cork' movie here .

== Context ==
The concept derives from Newton's second law when applied to a fluid parcel in the presence of a background stratification (in which the density changes in the vertical - i.e. the density can be said to have multiple vertical layers). The parcel, perturbed vertically from its starting position, experiences a vertical acceleration. If the acceleration is back towards the initial position, the stratification is said to be stable and the parcel oscillates vertically. In this case, N^{2} > 0 and the angular frequency of oscillation is given N. If the acceleration is away from the initial position (N^{2} < 0), the stratification is unstable. In this case, overturning or convection generally ensues.

The Brunt–Väisälä frequency relates to internal gravity waves: it is the frequency when the waves propagate horizontally; and it provides a useful description of atmospheric and oceanic stability.

== See also ==
- Buoyancy
- Bénard cell
