= Paul Douglas (meteorologist) =

Meteorologist, author, entrepreneur, and software expert

Douglas Paul Kruhoeffer (born June 12, 1958), known professionally as Paul Douglas, is an American meteorologist, author, and entrepreneur.

== Early life and education ==
Douglas Kruhoeffer was raised in Pennsylvania. His hometown is Lancaster, Pennsylvania. While in high school, he began using the stage name Paul Douglas. He graduated from Pennsylvania State University with a Bachelor of Science degree in Meteorology in 1980.

== Career ==
=== Broadcasting and journalism ===
While a senior in college, he began broadcasting the weekend weather reports for WNEP-TV in Scranton, Pennsylvania, and then after he graduated, he moved to weekdays. He worked for Satellite News Channel, based in Stamford, Connecticut, from 1982 to 1983. This was followed by a move to Minneapolis, Minnesota, where he worked at KARE (formerly WTCN-TV and WUSA) from 1983 to 1994. He was a weatherman in Chicago at WBBM-TV for three years before returning to Minneapolis where he worked at WCCO-TV from December 1997 until he was laid off in April 2008 as part of nationwide cutbacks by station owner CBS.

Douglas wrote a daily weather column for the Star Tribune from 1997 until his replacement by the WCCO-TV weather team in February 2009. He provided forecasts for three local radio stations. He has been a reporter for the Twin Cities Public Television show Almanac.

In 2009, the St. Cloud Times appointed him as the head of their meteorological team and Conservation Minnesota partnered with him to create MNWeatherCenter, a hub for Minnesota weather.

In 2010, the Star Tribune rehired him as a weather blogger.

=== Businessman ===
Douglas leads a number of companies that he founded or co-founded, including WeatherNation (as CEO), Broadcast Weather (as CEO) and Smart Energy (as President). In 2007, he co-founded SingularLogic LLC, a patent holding company, and he founded Broadcast Weather and NoozMe LLC, which hoped to capitalize on SingularLogic's patents.

He founded EarthWatch Communications in 1990, which created weather visualizations for the feature films Jurassic Park and Twister. He made a cameo appearance in a weather center scene in the latter. He co-founded Digital Cyclone in 1998 which created weather applications and supplies content for wireless devices under the My-Cast brand name. Douglas sold Digital Cyclone to Garmin in 2007 for $45 million.

=== Author, educator and speaker ===
Douglas regularly writes and speaks about global warming and is critical of those who say that it is not occurring or is not caused by human actions.

Douglas has authored two books, Prairie Skies: The Minnesota Weather Book (1992, ISBN 9780896582088) and Restless Skies (2004, ISBN 0760761132).

He has taught broadcast meteorology courses at Saint Cloud State University.

== Personal life ==
Paul Douglas and his wife have at least two sons, Brett and Walt. He is an Eagle Scout who is actively involved with Northern Star Council as a merit badge counselor for weather and astronomy, while also volunteering for SAVE (Suicide Awareness, Voices of Education) a non-profit company based in Bloomington, Minnesota.
