= Spartel =

Submerged island in the Strait of Gibraltar

Coordinates: 35.916667°N 5.966667°W

Spartel Bank or Majuán Bank is a submerged former island located in the Strait of Gibraltar near Cape Spartel and the Spartel Sill. Its highest point is currently 56 metres (184 ft) below the surface. Spartel Bank is one of several seamounts in the bed of Gibraltar Strait; similar but deeper seamounts are found at Camarinal Sill and further east. These represent landslide blocks which slid south from the north bank of the Strait of Gibraltar when the strait was formed, possibly through erosion by inflowing waters of the Zanclean flood.

It vanished under the surface approximately 12,000 years ago due to rising ocean levels from melting ice caps after the last Glacial Maximum. It has been proposed by researchers Jacques Collina-Girard and Marc-André Gutscher as a site for the legendary lost island of Atlantis. In follow-up correspondence, however, Gutscher indicated that the island could not have been Atlantis, referring to Plato's description of a Bronze Age society, which Spartel could not have supported at the time. A detailed review in the Bryn Mawr Classical Review comments on the discrepancies in Collina-Girard's dates and use of coincidences, concluding that he "has certainly succeeded in throwing some light upon some momentous developments in human prehistory in the area west of Gibraltar. Just as certainly, however, he has not found Plato's Atlantis."

== See also ==
- Location hypotheses of Atlantis
- Spartel Sill
- Strait of Gibraltar
