= Zanclean =

Earliest age on the geologic time scale of the Pliocene era

- 5.333 – 3.600 Ma
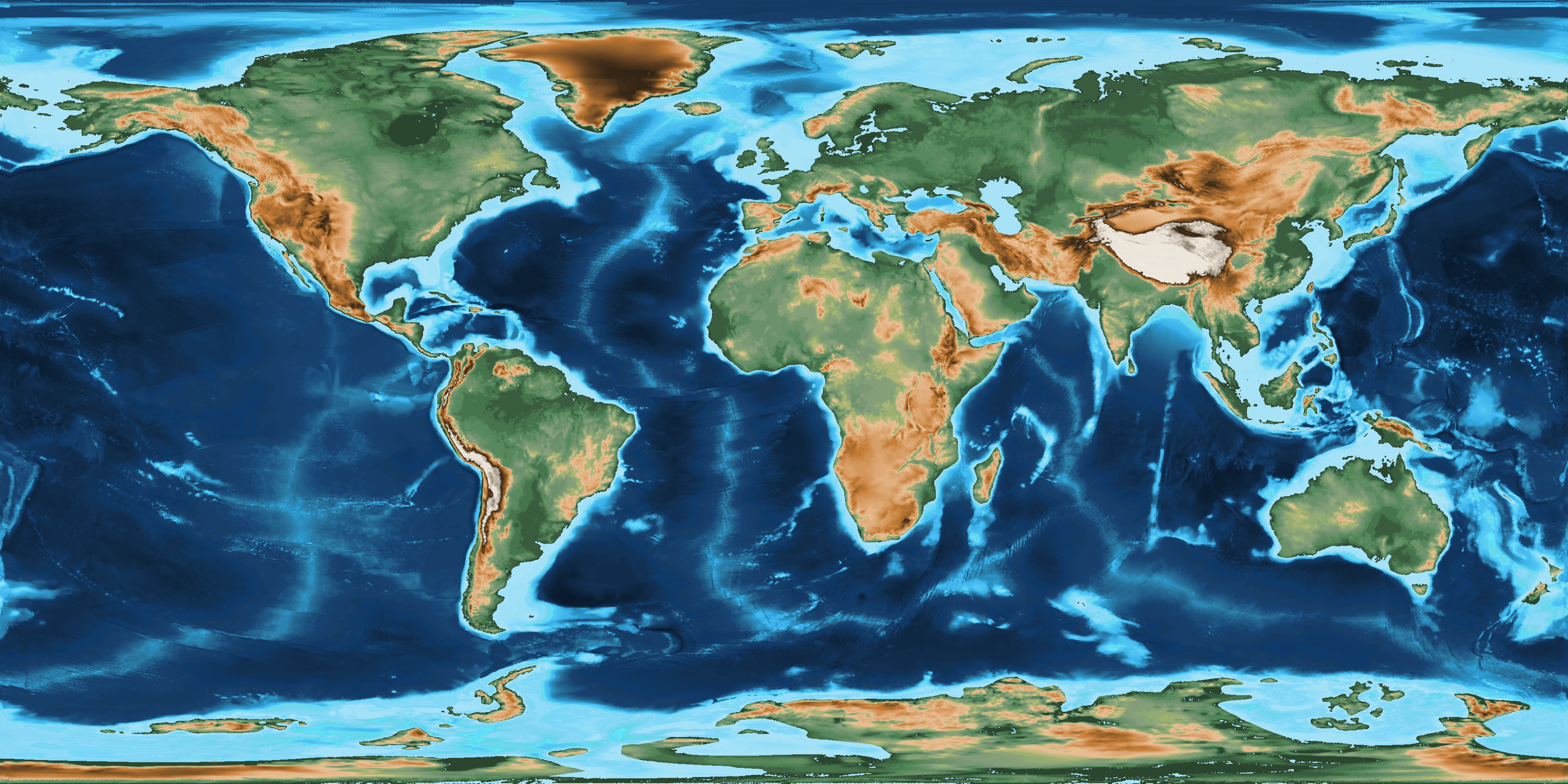
- A map of the world 5 million years ago during the Zanclean Age.

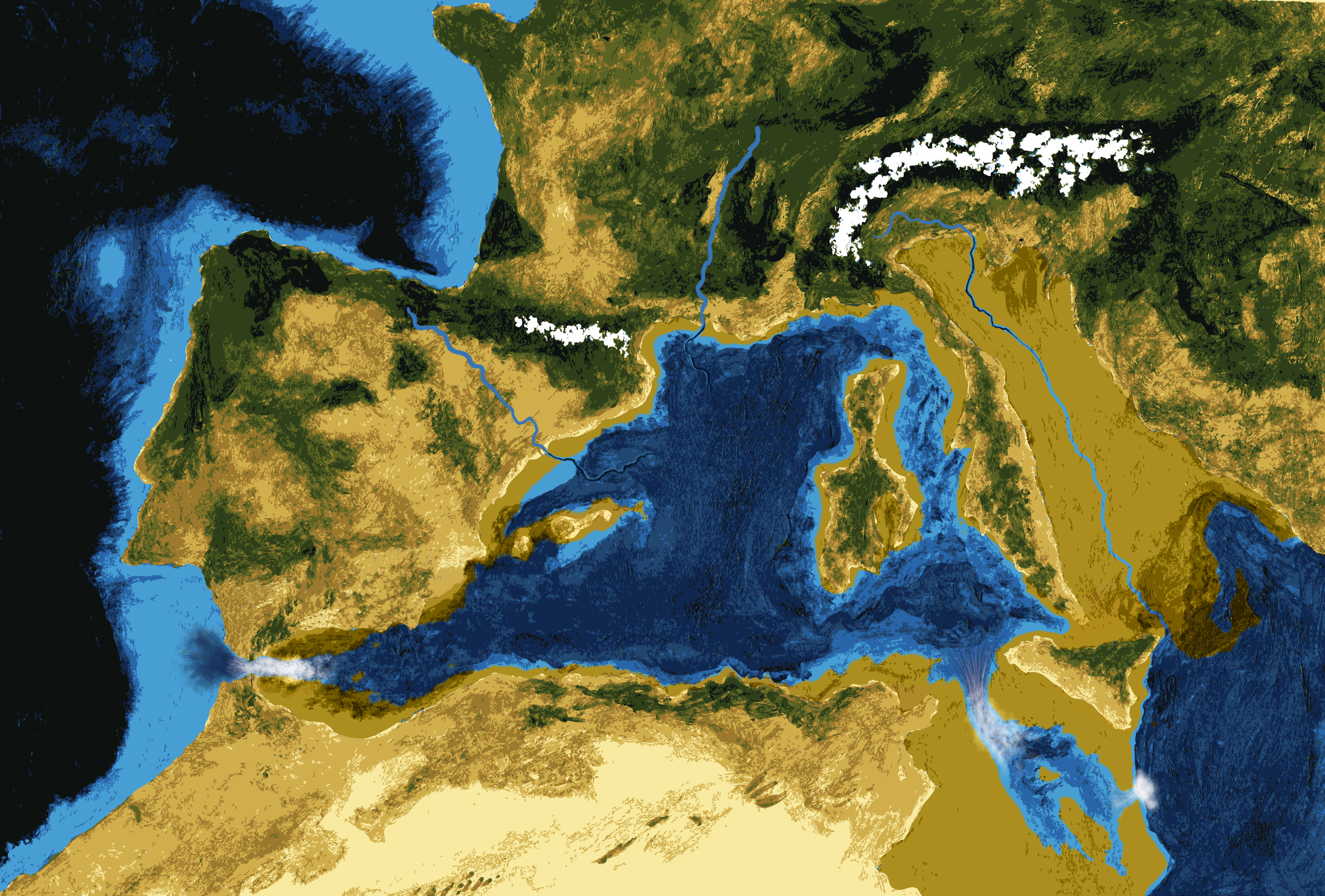
- Artistic interpretation of the Mediterranean's Zanclean flood 5.3 million years ago

Chronology
← / Messinian salinity crisis; ← / North American prairie expands
Subdivision of the Neogene according to the ICS, as of 2024. Vertical axis scale: Millions of years ago
- Formerly part of: Tertiary Period/System

Etymology
- Name formality: Formal

Usage information
- Celestial body: Earth
- Regional usage: Global (ICS)
- Time scale(s) used: ICS Time Scale

Definition
- Chronological unit: Age
- Stratigraphic unit: Stage
- Time span formality: Formal
- Lower boundary definition: Base of the Thvera magnetic event (C3n.4n), which is only 96 ka (5 precession cycles) younger than the GSSP
- Lower boundary GSSP: Heraclea Minoa section, Heraclea Minoa, Cattolica Eraclea, Sicily, Italy; 37.3917°N 13.2806°E
- Lower GSSP ratified: 2000
- Upper boundary definition: Base of Gauss/Gilbert (C2An/C2Ar) magnetic reversal
- Upper boundary GSSP: Punta Piccola Section, Porto Empedocle, Sicily, Italy; 37.2889°N 13.4933°E
- Upper GSSP ratified: January 1997

The Zanclean is the lowest stage or earliest age on the geologic time scale of the Pliocene. It spans the time between 5.332 ± 0.005 Ma (million years ago) and 3.6 ± 0.005 Ma. It is preceded by the Messinian Age of the Miocene Epoch, and followed by the Piacenzian Age.

The Zanclean can be correlated with regionally used stages, such as the Opoitian of New Zealand, and the Tabianian or Dacian of Central Europe. It also corresponds to the late Hemphillian to mid-Blancan North American Land Mammal Ages. In California, the Zanclean roughly corresponds to the middle part of the Delmontian stage.

== Definition ==
The Zanclean Stage was introduced by Giuseppe Seguenza in 1868. It is named after Zancle, the pre-Roman name for the Italian city of Messina on Sicily.

The base of the Zanclean (and the Pliocene Series) lies with the top of magnetic chronozone Cr3 (about 100,000 years before the Thvera normal subchronozone C3n.4n). The base is also close to the extinction level of the calcareous nanoplankton species Triquetrorhabdulus rugosus (the base of biozone CN10b) and the first appearance of nanoplankton Ceratolithus acutus. The GSSP for the Zanclean is in the vicinity of the ruins of the ancient city of Heraclea Minoa on Sicily, Italy.

The top of the Zanclean Stage (the base of the Piacenzian Stage) is at the base of magnetic chronozone C2An (the base of the Gauss chronozone and at the extinction of the planktonic forams Globorotalia margaritae and Pulleniatina primalis.

== Events of the Zanclean ==
- The Zanclean flood marked the beginning of the age and the end of the Messinian, as water poured in from the Atlantic Ocean through the Strait of Gibraltar to deluge the Mediterranean Basin and end the Messinian salinity crisis, a period about 5.96 Ma ago in the Messinian Age of the Miocene Epoch when the Mediterranean Sea had evaporated partly or completely.
- Deposits in the Everglades were deposited when high tropical water started to return in the late Zanclean.
