= Atlantida (Zhirov) =

Two books by Nikolay Zhirov

Atlantida (Russian: Атлантида) was a series of two monographs (1957 and 1964) by Russian chemist Nikolai Zhirov on the existence of Atlantis and its possible locations. He wrote these after his retirement.

In the preface he wrote: "My prime objective is to rise atlantology to the status of a recognised science. This can be done only by producing geological and geographical proof that Atlantis really existed."

In the ensuing discussions Zhirov's theories were classified as pseudoscience and dilettanttism. Nevertheless the Soviet atlantology could be found in popular science publications. After the dissolution of the Soviet Union (characterized, among other problems, the dramatically lowered authority of science), a certain surge of atlantology was observed. In particular, the Russian Atlantis Research Society (Русское общество по изучению проблем Атлантиды) was established in 2003, which, among other things, was dedicated to perpetuating the work of Nikolay Zhirov.

== Editions ==
- Атлантида. — М.: Географгиз, 1957. — 120 с. — 20 000 экз.
- Атлантида: Основные проблемы атлантологии / Науч. ред. и примеч. д-ра геогр. наук проф. Д. Г. Панова; Художник О. Айзман. — М.: Мысль, 1964. — 432 с. — (Географическая серия). — 12 000 экз. (в пер.)
  - Republished: Атлантида: Основные проблемы атлантологии. — М.: Вече, 2004. — 512 с. — ISBN 5-9533-0233-9
- Zhirov N. Th. Atlantis; Atlantology: basic problems / Tr. from the Russian by David Skvirsky; Editor's Foreword by Professor D. G. Panov. — Moscow, Progress Publishers, 1970 (online)
- Zhirov N. Atlantis. Atlantology — Basic Problems. Honolulu: University Press of the Pacific, 2001. — 444 с. (reprint of the English translation by Progress Publishers) ISBN 978-0-89875-591-6 (online)
