= Espartel Sill =

Second-shallowest seafloor barrier between Atlantic and Mediterranean

The Spartel or Espartel Sill is the westernmost of the sills separating the Mediterranean Sea and the Atlantic Ocean. This threshold is the second shallowest seafloor pass between the Iberian Peninsula and Africa. It is located near the Strait of Gibraltar and the Camarinal Sill, at 35°55′N 5°47′W, at a depth of −360 m. The deep, salty and dense waters of the Mediterranean outflow must climb to that depth when flowing towards the Atlantic.

== See also ==
- Spartel Bank
- Saddle point
