= Aquatic sill =

Seafloor barrier restricting water movement between basins

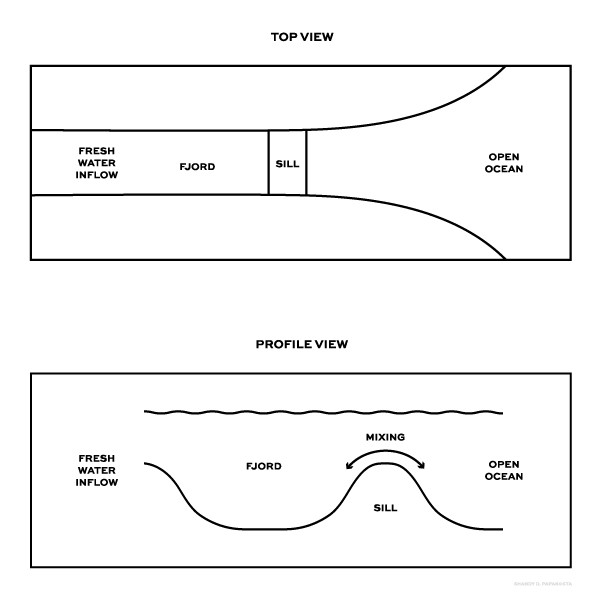
Influence of an aquatic sill on fjord water circulation

An aquatic sill (or an oceanic sill) is a sea floor barrier of relatively shallow depth (tens to hundreds of meters) that restricts water movement between benthic zones of an oceanic basin or lake bottom. There are roughly 400 sills in the Earth's oceans, covering 0.01% of the seafloor. A classic example is the Strait of Gibraltar Gateway between the Mediterranean Sea and the Atlantic Ocean.

== Formation processes ==
Aquatic sills are common in fjords, limiting their water exchange with the ocean. After the last ice age, approximately 18,000 years ago, continental glaciers extended to the continental shelves and created U-shaped glacial valleys, with long narrow openings that rise upward near the outer shelf, thereby creating sills.

== Aquatic sills as barriers ==
=== Circulation barriers ===
Aquatic sills can influence water circulation by restricting the movement of bottom water masses, resulting in partial to total separation of two basins. The restricted water circulation affects temporal variations in salinity and can result in oxygen depletion in deeper water masses.

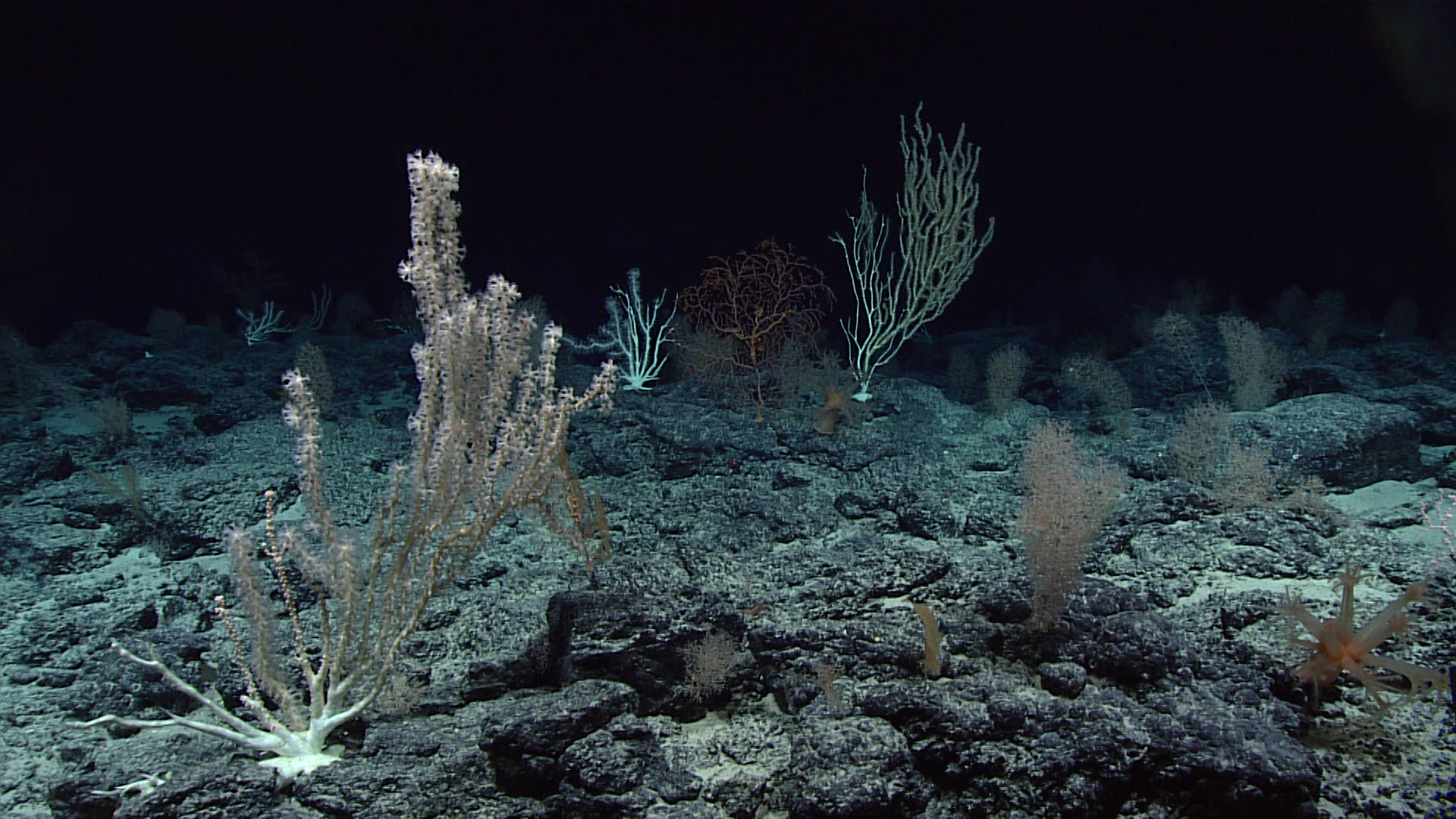
Cold water corals

=== Biogeographic barriers ===
An aquatic sill can be a biogeographic barrier for species between two basins, which commonly include sponges, bryozoans, bivalves, and cold-water corals. These communities tend to develop in highly productive waters, such as upwelling areas, and build non-tropical reefs, or bioherms, around sills.

== Notable examples ==
=== The Strait of Gibraltar Gateway ===
A classic example of an aquatic sill is the Strait of Gibraltar Gateway, which connects the Atlantic Ocean to the Mediterranean Sea, separates the Iberian Peninsula in Europe from Morocco in Africa, and limits exchange of deep fauna between the North Atlantic and Mediterranean Sea. The sill (~200 m depth) has elevated seabed topography with two "mounts" (Monte Seco and Monte Tartesos) separated by east–west-oriented depressions and north–south elevated morphological structures. At the sill, the eastward Atlantic water inflow meets the deep westward Mediterranean outflow. The sill is characterized by rocky seabed, low, muddy sedimentation, and accumulations of reef-forming cold water corals up to 40 metres (130 ft) thick. The gateway formed after the Messinian Crisis, 5.96–5.33 million years ago, when the Mediterranean Sea experienced a near-complete drought. During the Zanclean Flood that followed, two deep channels (Canal Norte and Sur) were scoured out. During the late Miocene and early Pliocene, a north–south-dominated tectonic stress field created pull-apart basins under a transtensional regime, thereby forming the gateway.

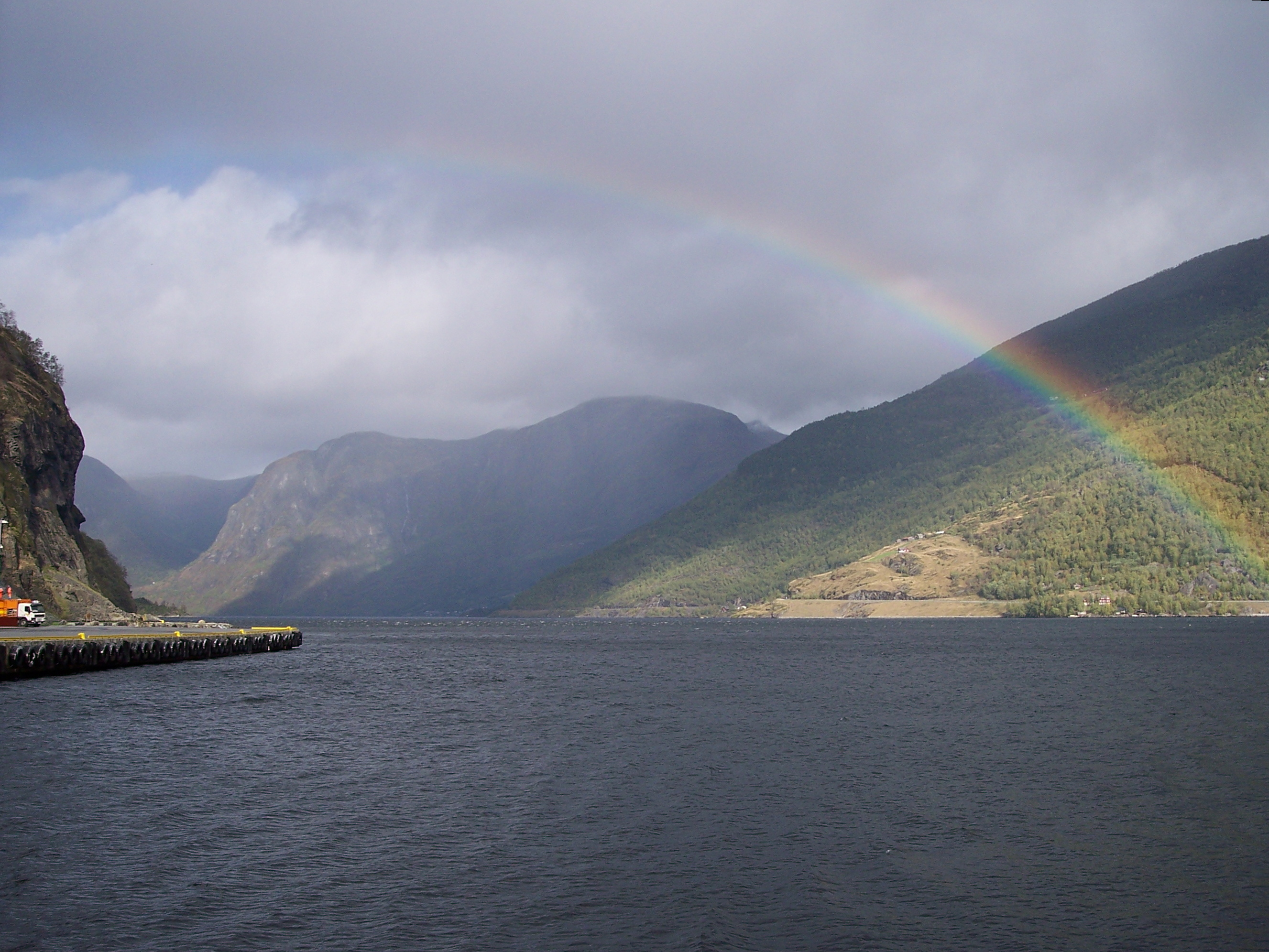
Aurlandsfjord, a fjord in Norway, has a sill at its mouth at Simlenes.

=== Other examples ===
- Apsheron Threshold
- Camarinal Sill
- Denmark Strait
- Espartel Sill
- Mona Passage

== See also ==
- Beach evolution
- Coastal management and coastal erosion
- Drop structure, a manmade sill
- Sill (geology)
