= Mediterranean outflow =

Flowing current

Figure 1: Locations within the North Atlantic Ocean relevant to the Mediterranean Outflow. Black arrows show the two different branches of the outflow.

The Mediterranean Outflow is a current flowing from the Mediterranean Sea towards the Atlantic Ocean through the Strait of Gibraltar. Once it has reached the western side of the Strait of Gibraltar, it divides into two branches, one flowing westward following the Iberian continental slope, and another returning to the Strait of Gibraltar circulating cyclonically. In the Strait of Gibraltar and in the Gulf of Cádiz, the Mediterranean Outflow core has a width of a few tens of km. Through its nonlinear interactions with tides and topography, as it flows out of the Mediterranean basin it undergoes such strong mixing that the water masses composing this current become indistinguishable upon reaching the western side of the strait.

== Formation and behavior ==
Light Atlantic water enters the Mediterranean Sea as a surface flow and spreads out through the Western and Eastern Mediterranean basins (separated by the Strait of Sicily), while being gradually modified by mixing with underlying waters. The density of these surface waters increases due to evaporation and warming, forming the saline and warm intermediate and deep Mediterranean Waters, which in turn flow into the Atlantic Ocean as an undercurrent through the Strait of Gibraltar at a rate of approximately 1 Sv (10^{6} m^{3}/s) and at 120 m depth approximately, forming the Mediterranean Outflow.

Once in the western side of the Strait of Gibraltar, the Mediterranean Outflow divides into two branches (see Figure 1). Most of the outflow travels westward along the Iberian continental slope (between St. Vincent Canyon and Gorringe Bank), and then moves northward as a poleward eastern boundary undercurrent reaching as far as north Porcupine Bank (50°N). While advancing westward, the Mediterranean Outflow becomes less saline due to mixing and entrainment with ambient waters and sinks gradually to its equilibrium depth of 1100 m approximately. The other branch of the Mediterranean Outflow recirculates cyclonically in the Gulf of Cádiz. The result is the formation of the Mediterranean Water that finally spreads into the interior of the North Atlantic forming the most prominent basin-scale thermohaline anomaly at mid-depths, the Mediterranean Salt Tongue, recognizable as a basin-scale salinity anomaly at 1000–1200 m depth through the North Atlantic (see Figure 2). Small scale processes and local scale nonlinear interaction with tides and topography have an impact on the Mediterranean Outflow Water properties and its further spreading pattern in the North Atlantic.

== Composition ==
Figure 2: Salinity field averaged over the year 2020 at 1200 m depth near the Strait of Gibraltar, where the Salt Tongue is visible. For clarity, the salinity colorbar only reaches 35.5, but its maximum value of 38 is achieved in the Mediterranean Sea. Data obtained from the GODAS dataset.

The Mediterranean Outflow is initially composed of different water masses. However, once it has gone through the Strait of Gibraltar these components are not distinguishable anymore. The different water masses composing the Mediterranean Outflow are:

- Levantine intermediate water (LIW): formed in the eastern basin of the Mediterranean Sea through open-sea convection.
- Western Mediterranean deep water (WMDW): formed in the Gulf of Lion (western basin) by deep convection.
- Tyrrhenian dense water: formed by mixing of old WMDW residing in the Tyrrhenian Sea with newly entered LIW flowing into the western Mediterranean Sea through the Strait of Sicily.
- Winter intermediate water: seasonally formed by convection of cooled modified Atlantic Water under severe winter conditions along the continental shelf of the Liguro-Provençal sub-basin and Catalan Sea.

These water masses are no longer distinguishable from each other upon exiting the Strait of Gibraltar. Instead, they are mixed thoroughly into a single, relatively homogenous water mass called the Mediterranean Water. The mixing is caused by important tidal dynamics over the Camarinal Sill. The barotropic tidal currents interact with its bathymetry to produce a remarkable internal tide that in turn gives rise to dissipation rates that are amongst the highest found in the world oceans.

== Interaction with tides ==
Tidal amplitudes change substantially from the western to the eastern side of the Strait of Gibraltar, going from 1.1 m to 0.2 m, respectively. In contrast, the lines of constant phase (cotidal lines) are mostly zonally oriented along the channel. Thus, the Gulf of Cádiz is strongly influenced by the different tidal regimes of the North Atlantic and the Strait of Gibraltar.

Tides interact with the system in two different ways. First, they are responsible for the strong mixing that causes different water masses to be indistinguishable from one another once they have gone through the Strait of Gibraltar. This is due to the tidal oscillatory flow interacting with the Camarinal Sill, creating an internal bore of high amplitude, which disintegrates into a train of internal solitary waves, which provide the sufficient energy for mixing.

Furthermore, studies show that if it were not for tides, the Mediterranean Salt Tongue would be much more intense and it would be shifted to the south. This behavior is obtained because without tides there would be a gradual increase in the salinity of the Gulf of Cádiz at Mediterranean Outflow water depths. This salinity surplus would propagate southwestward, as a mid-depth salinity front, suppressing the supply of fresher Antarctic Intermediate Water. This would produce a positive feedback that would further enhance the salinity increase and the southwestward spreading of the Mediterranean Outflow Water. This is because tidal residual currents contribute to the advection of Mediterranean Outflow Water west from the Gulf of Cádiz, allowing them to pass through the gap between St. Vincent Canyon and Gorringe Bank.

== Meddies ==
=== Formation and characteristics ===
Meddies are long-lived eddies (mainly anticyclonic) found in the North Atlantic Ocean containing water from the Mediterranean Sea, as they are formed due to the outflow Mediterranean currents. They are coherent vortices characterized by large salt and heat anomalies relative to their environment, typically these anomalies are of 0.4 - 1.1 g/kg and 2 - 4 °C, respectively. Meddies usually have radii from 10 to 50 km, are 500 – 1000 m thick, and are found at depths of 1100 m. Most meddy observations come from the area of the Mediterranean Salt Tongue, as they are mainly created in two sites near the Strait of Gibraltar: Cape St. Vincent and Estremadura Promontory (see Figure 1). Every year, between 15 and 20 meddies are formed at these two sites, and there is a higher probability for meddy formation when the undercurrent speed is high. Meddies can survive for many years and can move through thousands of kilometers, thus they constitute a principal means by which ocean tracers are transported. Their open ocean decay is very slow, while topographic interactions appear to be the main decaying cause of meddies. These interactions are significant to the maintenance of the Mediterranean Salt Tongue, indeed studies estimate that meddies inject 25 - 50% of the salt anomaly necessary to sustain the Mediterranean Salt Tongue.

=== Interaction with bathymetry ===
Two main topographic features block open ocean meddy migration: the Horseshoe Seamount and the Great Meteor Seamount (see Figure 1). The former is a curved grouping of seamounts almost reaching the surface (600 m depth) located southwest of Cape St. Vincent and is the primary topographic obstacle facing many newly formed meddies. The Great Meteor Seamount constitutes a significant topographic anomaly of the Mid-Atlantic Ridge with which many meddies also interact. Seamounts catalyze significant exchange between meddies and the background water of the North Atlantic, because meddy-seamount interaction can lead to meddy destruction, thus releasing their warmer saline water. For this reason, seamount-meddy interactions are considered to be potentially significant (and maybe dominant) in the maintenance of the Mediterranean Salt Tongue. Nevertheless, 60 – 70% of the meddies survive the seamount encounters, remaining intact as coherent vortices, so other mechanisms are needed to maintain the Salt Tongue. The reason for meddies being able to survive at such a large rate from seamount encounters is that they are strong potential vorticity anomalies, thus they are difficult to destroy. Hence, vortex survival is a limiting influence on the Mediterranean Salt Tongue, i.e., vortices emerging from the seamount impact export the bulk of the meddy salinity anomaly to the rest of the North Atlantic, rather than depositing it locally, being able to travel for thousands of kilometers.

== Effect of Mediterranean Outflow on the circulation of the North Atlantic and the World Oceans ==
Apart from the formation of meddies and the salt tongue, the Mediterranean Outflow has some other effects on the North Atlantic Ocean, or the world oceans in general. Even if the Mediterranean Outflow is of only 1 Sv, which is relatively small compared with other outflows found in the North Atlantic, its salinity and temperature are extremely high compared with any other waters in that depth range, 38 g/kg and 13 °C, respectively. These large contrasts in water mass properties help identify the northward flow along the eastern boundary to the Greenland-Scotland sill, but also a westward flow across the Atlantic that turns southward along the western boundary, reaching the Antarctic Circumpolar Current and the Weddell Sea. These added heat and salt from the Mediterranean outflow are spread southward along the western boundary into the South Atlantic Ocean, where its contribution makes the southward flow warmer and more saline than the incoming circumpolar waters to the east.

Furthermore, even in distant regions such as near Iceland or the Weddell Sea, this water retains salinities high enough to form, when cooled enough, the densest waters of the northern North Atlantic and the Weddell Sea.

== See also ==
- Portal: Oceans
- Physical oceanography
- Ocean current
