= Francesco Stipo =

Francesco Stipo (born 1973) is a Globalist writer.

== Biography ==
Francesco Stipo was born in Rome, Italy, in 1973. He studied law at La Sapienza University, where he won an Erasmus scholarship that allowed him to continue part of his studies in Jerez de la Fontera, Spain.

While living in Spain, he was the first person to cross the Strait of Gibraltar with a powered paraglider, on July 11, 1995. The event was reported in many Spanish newspapers including ABC, Diario de Jerez, Europa Sur and Italian magazines such as No Limits.

In 1996 he won a scholarship from the Italian National Council of Research on the subject "juridical discipline of the outer space"; the thesis, entitled "La Definizione del Concetto Giuridico di Spazio Cosmico", was published in the Italian law journal Giurisprudenza di Merito.

After obtaining a Ph.D. in international law, in 2001 he moved to the United States where he obtained a master's degree (LLM) in comparative law from the University of Miami.

Since 2002 he has been living in Miami, Florida; he has been working as a lawyer for European and American firms specializing in international business transactions. He fluently speaks 5 languages (English, Italian, Spanish, Portuguese and French) and has travelled extensively around the world.

== Published works ==
Dr. Stipo wrote books and articles published in Europe and the United States: The most important works are:

1) "World Federalist Manifesto. Guide to Political Globalization"

The book offers the reader a global and unitary vision of international organizations, giving insights on the inner mechanisms of the United Nations and a creative and constructive approach to the phenomenon of globalization. The book encompasses all social sciences, examining international issues by a technical prospective, analyzing the economic, political, financial and legal elements of globalization and offering solutions to international problems. The author focuses on the political aspects of globalization, examining the application of a confederate political model at world level while reviewing the historical background of world federalism. The author presents a model of world confederation divided in international legislative, executive, judicial and financial branches. The authority of the world government is shared with the Member States, in a way that both are sovereign within their respective sphere of competence.

The world confederation, as envisioned by the author in the book, would not supersede the authority of the State governments but complement it, as both the States and the world authority would have power within their sphere of competence; the book presents a political globalization where the economic balances of world nations are preserved at international level. The World Federalist Manifesto constitutes an important contribution to the progress of humanity and is directed to all people directly or indirectly involved in globalization.

2) "United Nations Reorganization. The Unification of the UN System"

The book deals with the reform of the United Nations, introducing the idea of a unification of the UN system. The author proposes the creation of a voting system proportional to the level of contribution, applicable to all UN specialized agencies, which would allow the central executive body (for example, the Secretariat) to draw up a budget plan, which would allocate the international contributions among the different specialized agencies. The book proposes the unification of the specialized agencies under one single budget, and a single voting system; they would change their juridical nature from separated agencies to International Ministries or International Departments: becoming internal divisions of the United Nations, their general policy would be directed by the Secretary General.

3) "The Reform of the Budget and the Administration of the United Nations. The Balanced Contribution Theory and the Introduction of an Income-Based Contribution System to the International Organizations"

The book analyzes the main current issues of the international organizations: it examines the impact of United Nations]contributions on nations’ budget and tax rates, the economic cost of the fragmentation of the United Nations system in different specialized agencies and the risk of stall of the Security Council. The result of the analysis empirically demonstrates the adverse effects of international contributions on national budgets, due to the lack of balance between national income and the criteria of nations’ contribution to the UN, the World Trade Organization, the World Bank Group and the International Monetary Fund. The book shows the benefits of a greater voting power of developed countries, like the United States, in international organizations through the adoption of an income-based contribution system which balances nations’ voting power with the level of Member States’ national income.

Francesco Stipo has also published articles in European law journals:

1) "Disciplina del Sistema Globale di Navigazione Satellitare", published in Spain, in Revista Europea de Derecho de la Navegación Marítima y Aeronáutica, ISSN 1130-2127, Nº 14, 1998, 1891-1906

2) "La Definizione del Concetto Giuridico di Spazio Cosmico", published in Italy, in Giurisprudenza di Merito, May 2000, 1118, 1132.

== Bibliography ==
- World Federalist Manifesto. Guide to Political Globalization ISBN 978-0-9794679-2-9
- United Nations Reorganization. The Unification of the UN System ISBN 978-0-9794679-1-2
- The Balanced Contribution Theory ISBN 978-0-9794679-0-5
- Disciplina del Sistema Globale di Navigazione Satellitare, ISSN 1130-2127
