= Hypothetical locations of Atlantis =

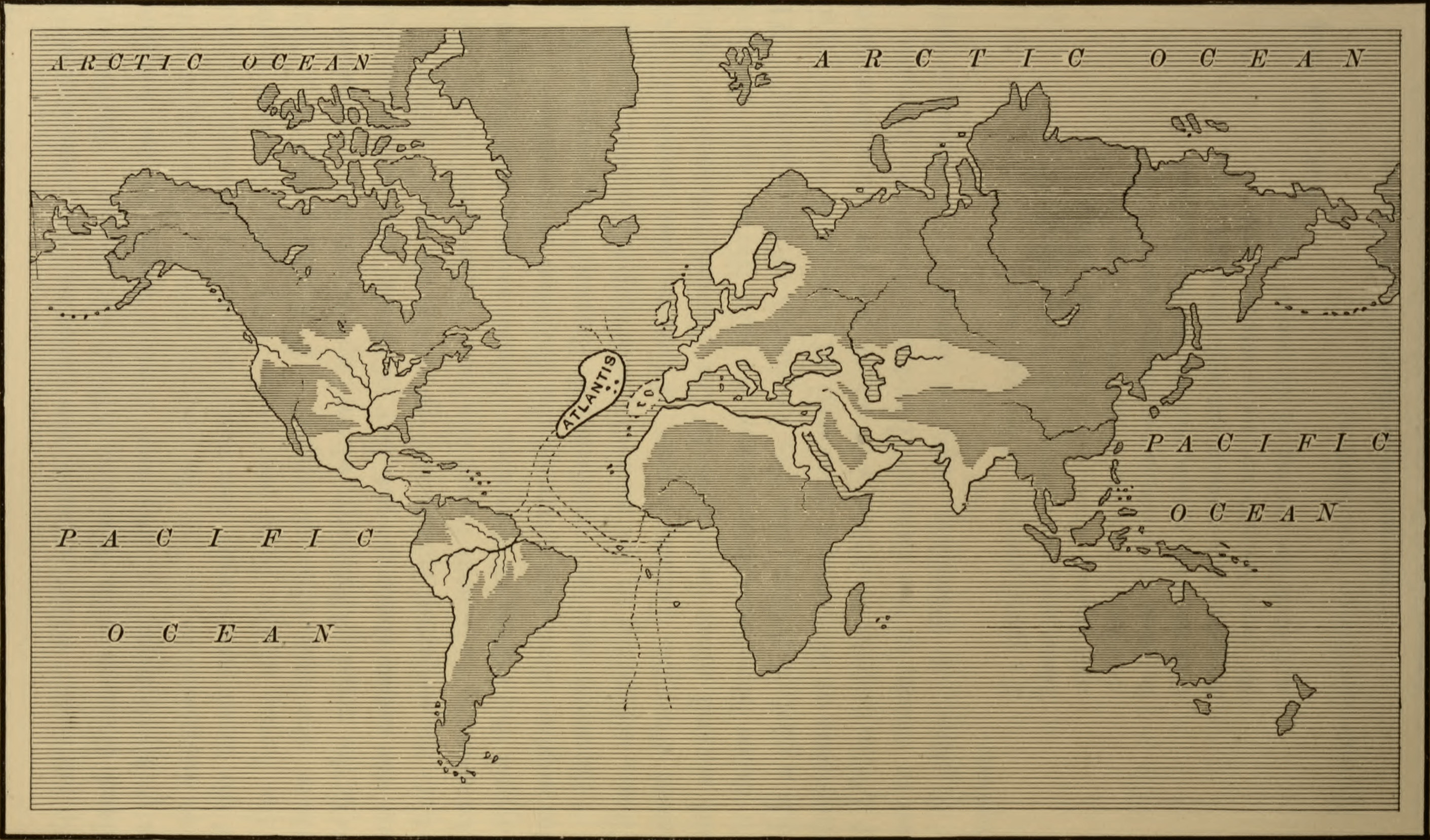
A map showing the supposed extent of the Atlantean Empire. From Ignatius L. Donnelly's Atlantis: the Antediluvian World, 1882.

There exist a variety of speculative proposals that real-world events could have inspired Plato's fictional story of Atlantis, told in the Timaeus and Critias. While Plato's story was not part of the Greek mythic tradition and his dialogues use it solely as an allegory about hubris, speculation about real natural disasters that could have served as inspiration have been published in popular accounts and in a few academic contexts. Additionally, many works of pseudohistory and pseudoarchaeology treat the story as fact, offering reinterpretations that tie to national mysticism or legends of ancient aliens. While Plato's story explicitly locates Atlantis in the Atlantic Ocean beyond the Pillars of Hercules, other proposed locations for Atlantis include Helike, Thera, Troy, and the North Pole.

== North-West of Egypt: From Greece to Spain ==
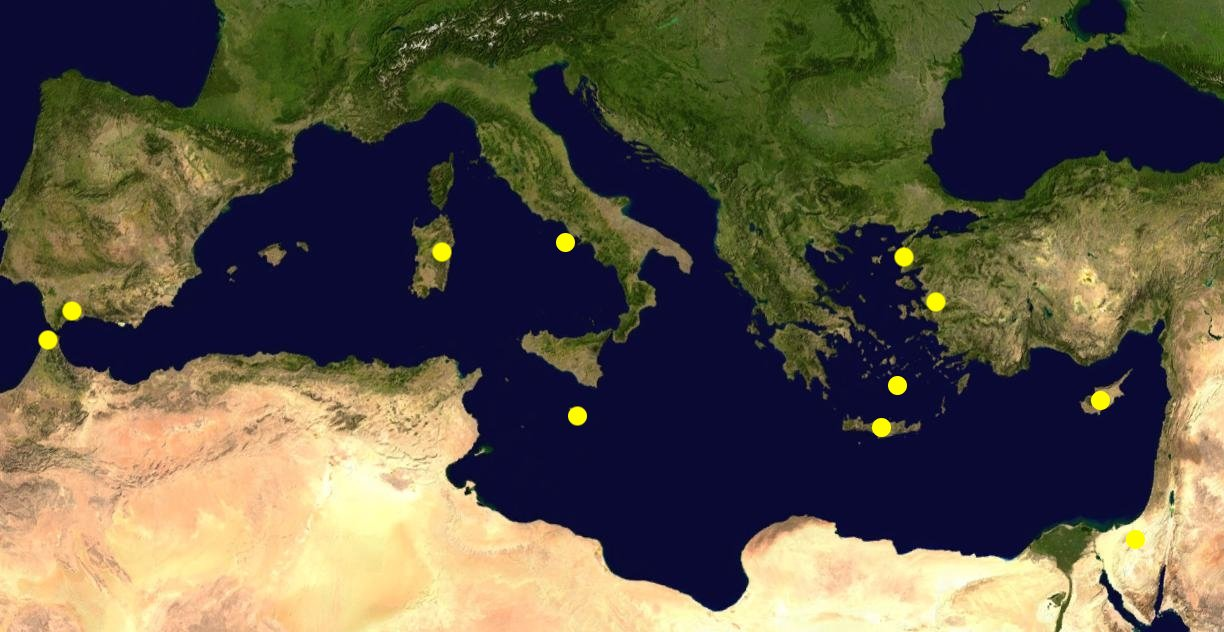
Proposed locations of Atlantis in the Mediterranean

Most proposals for the location of Atlantis center on the Mediterranean, influenced largely by the geographical location of Egypt from which the story has literary antecedents.

=== Thera eruption ===
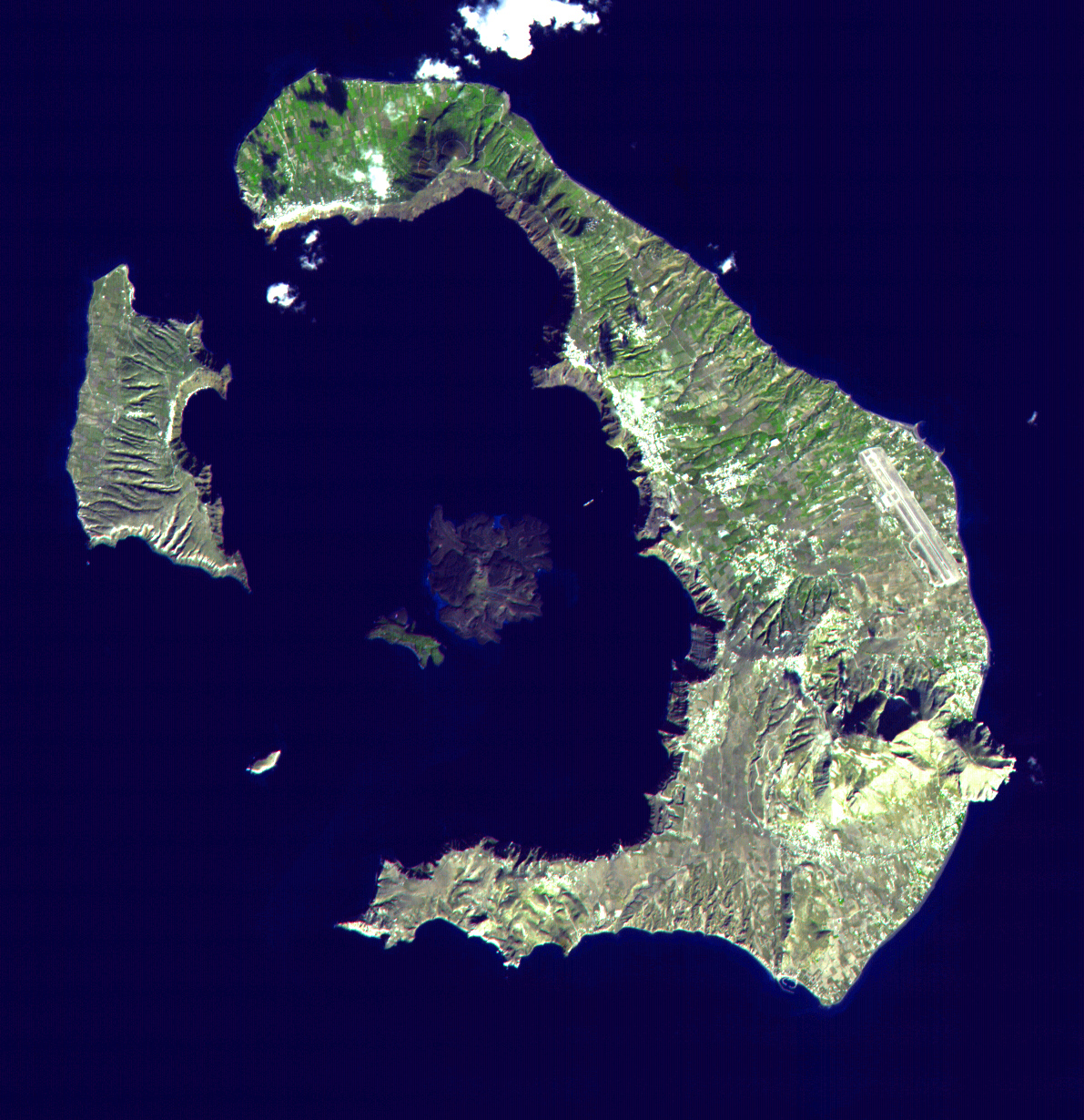
Satellite image of the Island of Thera, also called Santorini. Clockwise from center: Nea Kameni; Palea Kameni; Aspronisi; Therasia; Thera

The story of Atlantis has been argued since the early twentieth century to have preserved a cultural memory of the Thera eruption, which destroyed the town of Akrotiri and affected some Minoan settlements on Crete.

=== In mainland Greece ===
The classicist Robert L. Scranton argued in an article published in Archaeology that Atlantis was the "Copaic drainage complex and its civilization" in Lake Copais, Boeotia. Modern archaeological discoveries have revealed a Mycenaean-era drainage complex and subterranean channels in the lake.

=== Near Cyprus ===
An American architect, Robert Sarmast, claims that Atlantis lies at the bottom of the eastern Mediterranean within the Cyprus Basin. In his book and on his web site, he argues that images prepared from sonar data of the sea bottom of the Cyprus Basin southeast of Cyprus show features resembling man-made structures on it at depths of 1,500 meters. He interprets these features as being artificial structures that are part of the lost city of Atlantis as described by Plato. According to his ideas, several characteristics of Cyprus, including the presence of copper and extinct Cyprus dwarf elephants and local place names and festivals (Kataklysmos), support his identification of Cyprus as once being part of Atlantis. As with many other proposals concerning the location of Atlantis, Sarmast speculates that its destruction by catastrophic flooding is reflected in the story of Noah's Flood in Genesis.

In part, Sarmast bases his claim that Atlantis can be found offshore of Cyprus beneath 0.9 miles (1.4 km) of water on an abundance of evidence that the Mediterranean Sea dried up during the Messinian Salinity Crisis when its level dropped by 2 to 3 miles (3.2 to 4.8 km) below the level of the Atlantic Ocean as the result of tectonic uplift blocking the inflow of water through the Strait of Gibraltar. Separated from the Atlantic Ocean, the Mediterranean Sea either partly or completely dried up as the result of evaporation. As a result, its formerly submerged bottom turned into a desert with large saline and brackish lakes. This whole area was flooded when a ridge collapsed allowing the catastrophic flooding through the Straits of Gibraltar. However, Sarmast disagrees with mainstream geologists, oceanographers, and paleontologists in arguing that the closing of the Straits of Gibraltar; the desiccation and subaerial exposure of the floor of the Mediterranean Sea; and its catastrophic flooding has occurred "forty times or more times in its long and turbulent existence" and that "the age of each of these events is unknown." In the same interview, he also contradicts what mainstream geologists, oceanographers, and paleontologists argue in claiming that "Scientists know that roughly 18,000 years ago, there was not just one Mediterranean Sea, but three." However, he does not specify who these scientists are; nor does he cite peer-reviewed scientific literature that supports this claim.

Marine and other geologists, who have also studied the bottom of the Cyprus basin, and professional archaeologists completely disagree with his interpretations. Investigations by Dr. C. Hübscher of Geophysical Institute of University of Hamburg and others of the salt tectonics and mud volcanism within the Cyprus Basin, eastern Mediterranean Sea, demonstrated that the features which Sarmast interprets to be Atlantis consist only of a natural compressional fold caused by local salt tectonics and a slide scar with surficial compressional folds at the downslope end and sides of the slide. This research corroborates seismic data shown and discussed in the Atlantis: New Revelations 2-hour Special episode of Digging for the Truth, a History Channel documentary television series. Using reflection seismology, this documentary demonstrated techniques that what Sarmast interpreted to be artificial walls are natural tectonic landforms.

Furthermore, the interpretation of the age and stratigraphy of sediments blanketing the bottom of the Cyprus Basin from sea bottom cores containing Pleistocene and older marine sediments and thousands of kilometers of seismic lines from the Cyprus and adjacent basins clearly demonstrates that the Mediterranean Sea last dried up during the Messinian Salinity Crisis between 5.59 and 5.33 million years ago. For example, research conducted south of Cyprus as part of Leg 160 of the Ocean Drilling Project recovered from Sites 963, 965, and 966 cores of sediments underlying the bottom of the Mediterranean Sea at depths as shallow as 470, 1506, and 1044 meters (1540, 4940, and 3420 ft) below sea level. Thus, these cores came from parts of sea bottom of the eastern Mediterranean Sea that either lie above or at the depth of Sarmast's Atlantis, which lies at depths between 1,470 and 1,510 meters (4,820 and 4,950 ft) below mean sea level. These cores provide a detailed and continuous record of sea level that demonstrates that for millions of years at least during the entire Pliocene, Pleistocene, and Holocene epochs that the feature that Sarmast interprets to be Atlantis and its adjacent sea bottom were always submerged below sea level. Therefore, the entire Cyprus Basin, including the ridge where Sarmast claims that Atlantis is located, has been submerged beneath the Mediterranean Sea for millions of years. Since its formation, the sea bottom feature identified by Sarmast as "Atlantis" has always been submerged beneath over a kilometer of water.

=== Helike ===
A number of classical scholars have proposed that Plato's inspiration for the story came from the earthquake and tsunami which destroyed Helike in 373 BC, just a few years before he wrote the relevant dialogues. The claim that Helike is the inspiration for Plato's Atlantis is also supported by Dora Katsonopoulou and Steven Soter.

=== Sardinia ===
The concept of the identification of Atlantis with the island of Sardinia is the idea that the Italians were involved in the Sea Peoples movement (a similar story to Plato's account), that the name "Atlas" may have been derived from "Italos" via the Middle Egyptian language, and Plato's descriptions of the island and the city of Atlantis share several traits with Sardinia and its Bronze Age culture.

Luigi Usai has claimed Atlantis could be beneath Sardinia and Corsica. Atlantis would be the bathymetrically submerged island whose plateaus form what we know as the islands of Sardinia and Corsica outside the surface of the water. The capital would have its center on a hill near the small town of Santadi, in the province of Cagliari. Starting from the hill next to Santadi, it's possible to see the perfectly circular development of all the town planning. He has also said there are also many toponymic references to the myth of Atlantis, including the two hot and cold water sources placed by Poseidon: the cold water source of Zinnigas, which still remains today also in the name of the "Castello d'Acquafredda" di Siliqua (Coldwater Castle), and the hot water source, present in the toponymy in three neighborhoods next to the small town of nuxis, still called "Acquacadda" (Hotwater), "S'Acqua Callenti de Susu" and "S'Acqua Callenti de Basciu" (Upper hotwater and Down hotwater), which are small villages next to Santadi.

=== Malta ===
Malta, being situated in the dividing line between the western and eastern Mediterranean Sea, and being home to some of the oldest man-made structures in the world, is considered a possible location of Atlantis both by some current researchers and by Maltese amateur enthusiasts.

In the 19th century, the antiquarian Giorgio Grognet de Vassé published a short compendium arguing that Malta was the location of Atlantis. He was inspired by the discovery of the megalithic temples of Ġgantija and Ħaġar Qim during his lifetime.

In Malta fdal Atlantis (Maltese remains of Atlantis) (2002), Francis Galea writes about several older ideas, particularly that of Maltese architect Giorgio Grongnet, who in 1854 thought that the Maltese Islands are the remnants of Atlantis. However, in 1828, the same Giorgo Grongnet was involved in a scandal concerning forged findings which were intended to provide a "proof" for the claim that Malta was Atlantis.

== North-East of Egypt: From Middle East to the Black Sea ==
=== Turkey ===
Peter James, in his book The Sunken Kingdom, identifies Atlantis with the kingdom of Zippasla. He argues that Solon did indeed gather the story on his travels, but in Lydia, not Egypt as Plato states; that Atlantis is identical with Tantalis, the city of Tantalus in Asia Minor, which was (in a similar tradition known to the Greeks) said to have been destroyed by an earthquake; that the legend of Atlantis' conquests in the Mediterranean is based on the revolution by King Madduwattas of Zippasla against Hittite rule; that Zippasla is identical with Sipylus, where Greek tradition placed Tantalis; and that the now vanished lake to the north of Mount Sipylus was the site of the city.

=== Troy ===
The geoarchaeologist Eberhard Zangger has proposed that Atlantis was in fact the city state of Troy. He both agrees and disagrees with Rainer W. Kühne: He too believes that the Trojans-Atlanteans were the sea peoples, but only a minor part of them. He proposes that all Greek speaking city states of the Aegean civilization or Mycenae constituted the sea peoples and that they destroyed each other's economies in a series of semi-fratricidal wars lasting several decades.

=== Black Sea ===
The rectangle has dimensions of approximately 555 km by 370 km (3000 to 2000 stadia – plain of Atlantis). The circle is around Snake Island (potential candidate for the capital of Atlantis), located 35 km east of the Danube Delta.

German researchers Siegfried and Christian Schoppe locate Atlantis in the Black Sea. Before 5500 BC, a great plain lay in the northwest at a former freshwater-lake. In 5510 BC, rising sea level topped the barrier at today's Bosporus. They identify the Pillars of Hercules with the Strait of Bosporus. They gave no explanation how the ships of the merchants coming from all over the world had arrived at the harbour of Atlantis when it was 350 feet below global sea-level.

They claim Oreichalcos means the obsidian stone that used to be a cash equivalent at that time and was replaced by the spondylus shell around 5500 BC, which would suit the red, white, black motif. The geocatastrophic event led to the Neolithic diaspora in Europe, also beginning 5500 BC.

=== Sea of Azov ===
The Great Atlantis Flood, by Flying Eagle and Whispering Wind, locates Atlantis in the Sea of Azov. These authors published their theory in the Atlantis Motherland book (2003) proposing that the Dialogues of Plato present an accurate account of geological events, which occurred in 9,600 BC, in the Black Sea-Mediterranean Corridor. Glacial melt-waters, at the end of the Younger Dryas Ice Age caused a dramatic rise in the sea level of the Caspian Sea. An earthquake caused a fracture, which allowed the Caspian Sea to flood across the fertile plains of Atlantis. Simultaneously the earthquake caused the vast farmlands of Atlantis to sink, forming the present day Sea of Azov, the shallowest sea in the world.

== Around Gibraltar: Near the Pillars of Hercules ==
=== Andalusia ===
Andalusia is a region in modern-day southern Spain which once included the "lost" city of Tartessos, which disappeared in the 6th century BC. The Tartessians were traders known to the Ancient Greeks who knew of their legendary king Arganthonios. The proposal that Andalusia was Atlantis was originally developed by the Spanish author Juan de Mariana and the Dutch author Johannes van Gorp (Johannes Goropius Becanus), both of the 16th century, later by José Pellicer de Ossau Salas y Tovar in 1673, who suggested that the metropolis of Atlantis was between the islands Mayor and Menor, located almost in the center of the Doñana Marshes, and expanded upon by Juan Fernández Amador y de los Ríos in 1919, who suggested that the metropolis of Atlantis was located precisely where today are the 'Marismas de Hinojo'. These claims were made again in 1922 by the German author Adolf Schulten, and further propagated by Otto Jessen, Richard Hennig, Victor Bérard, and Elena Wishaw in the 1920s. The suggested locations in Andalusia lie outside the Pillars of Hercules, and therefore beyond but close to the Mediterranean itself.

In 2005, based upon the work of Adolf Schulten, the German teacher Werner Wickboldt also claimed this to be the location of Atlantis. Wickboldt suggested that the war of the Atlanteans refers to the war of the Sea Peoples who attacked the Eastern Mediterranean countries around 1200 BC and that the Iron Age city of Tartessos may have been built at the site of the ruined Atlantis. In 2000, Georgeos Diaz-Montexano published an article arguing that Atlantis was located somewhere between Andalusia and Morocco.

An Andalusian location was also supported by Rainer Walter Kühne in his article that appeared in the journal Antiquity. "Kühne suggests that Plato has used three different historical elements for this tale. (i) Greek tradition on Mycenaean Athens for the description of ancient Athens, (ii) Egyptian records on the wars of the Sea Peoples for the description of the war of the Atlanteans, and (iii) oral tradition from Syracuse about Tartessos for the description of the city and geography of Atlantis." According to Wickboldt, Satellite images show two rectangular shapes on the tops of two small elevations inside the marsh of Doñana which he claims are the "temple of Poseidon" and "the temple of Cleito and Poseidon". On satellite images parts of several "rings" are recognizable, similar in their proportion with the ring system by Plato. It is not known if any of these shapes are natural or manmade and archaeological excavations are planned. Geologists have shown that the Doñana National Park experienced intense erosion from 4000 BC until the 9th century AD, where it became a marine environment. For thousands of years until the Medieval Age, all that occupied the area of the modern Marshes Doñana was a gulf or inland sea-arm, but there was not even a small island with sufficient space to house a small village.

=== Spartel Bank ===
Two proposals have put Spartel Bank, a submerged former island in the Strait of Gibraltar, as the location of Atlantis. The more well-known claim was proposed in a September 2001 issue of Comptes Rendus de l'Académie des Sciences by French geologist Jacques Collina-Girard. The lesser-known proposal was first published by Spanish-Cuban investigator Georgeos Díaz-Montexano in an April 2000 issue of Spanish magazine Más Allá de la Ciencia (Beyond Science), and later in August 2001 issues of Spanish magazines El Museo (The Museum) and Año Cero (Year Zero). The origin of Collina-Girard's idea is disputed, with Díaz-Montexano claiming it as plagiarism of his own earlier proposal, and Collina-Girard denying any plagiarism. Both individuals claim the other's arguments are pseudoscience.

Collina-Girard states that during the most recent Glacial Maximum of the Ice Age sea level was 135 m below its current level, narrowing the Gibraltar Strait and creating a small half-enclosed sea measuring 70 km by 20 km between the Mediterranean and Atlantic Ocean. The Spartel Bank formed an archipelago in this small sea with the largest island measuring about 10 to 12 kilometers across. With rising ocean levels the island began to slowly shrink, but then at around 9400 BC (11,400 years ago) there was an accelerated sea level rise of 4 meters per century known as Meltwater pulse 1A, which drowned the top of the main island. The occurrence of a great earthquake and tsunami in this region, similar to the 1755 Lisbon earthquake (magnitude 8.5-9) was proposed by marine geophysicist Marc-Andrè Gutscher as offering a possible explanation for the described catastrophic destruction (reference — Gutscher, M.-A., 2005. Destruction of Atlantis by a great earthquake and tsunami? A geological analysis of the Spartel Bank hypothesis. Geology, v. 33, p. 685-688.). Collina-Girard proposes that the disappearance of this island was recorded in prehistoric Egyptian tradition for 5,000 years until it was written down by the first Egyptian scribes around 4000-3000 BC, and the story then subsequently inspired Plato to write a fictionalized version interpreted to illustrate his own principles.

A detailed review in the Bryn Mawr Classical Review comments on the discrepancies in Collina-Girard's dates and use of coincidences, concluding that he "has certainly succeeded in throwing some light upon some momentous developments in human prehistory in the area west of Gibraltar. Just as certainly, however, he has not found Plato's Atlantis."

== Richat Structure, Mauritania ==
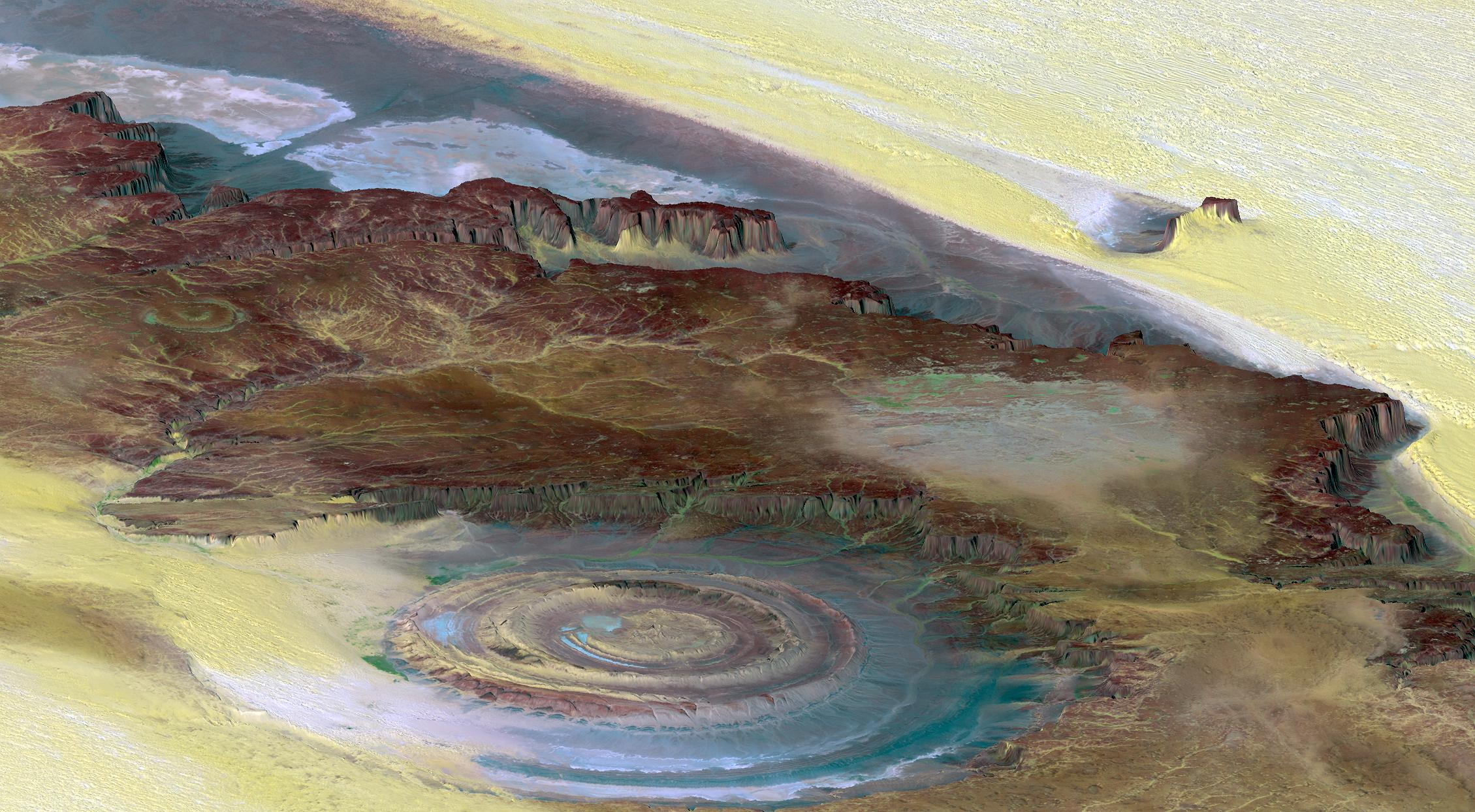
Richat Structure, Mauritania

The Richat Structure in Mauritania has also been proposed as the site of Atlantis. This structure is generally considered to be a deeply eroded domal structure that overlies a still-buried alkaline igneous intrusion. From 1974 onward, prehistoric artifacts of the area were mapped, finding an absence of prehistoric artifacts or Paleolithic or Neolithic stone tools from the structure's innermost depressions. Neither recognizable midden deposits nor manmade structures were found in the area, thus concluding that the area was used only for short-term hunting and stone tool manufacturing during prehistoric times.

== Atlantic Ocean: East ==
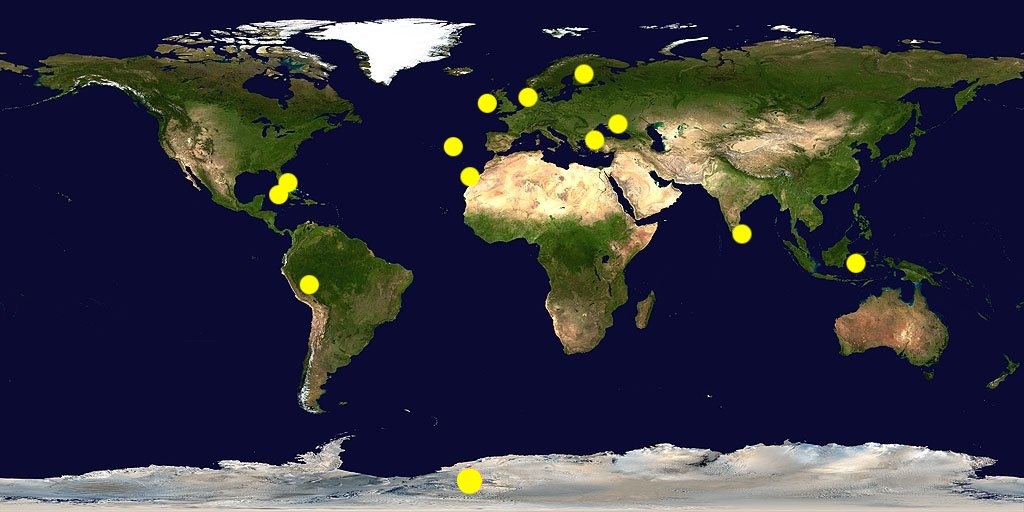
Proposed locations of Atlantis

It has been thought that when Plato wrote of the Sea of Atlantis, he may have been speaking of the area now called the Atlantic Ocean. The ocean's name, derived from Greek mythology, means the "Sea of Atlas". Plato remarked that, in describing the origins of Atlantis, this area was allotted to Poseidon. In Ancient Greek times the terms "Ocean" and "Atlas" both referred to the 'Giant Water' which surrounded the main landmass known at that time by the Greeks, which could be described as Eurafrasia (although this whole supercontinent was far from completely known to the Ancient Greeks), and thus this water mass was considered to be the 'end of the (known) world', for the same reason the name "Atlas" was given to the mountains near the Ocean, the Atlas Mountains, as they also denoted the 'end of the (known) world'.

=== Azores Islands ===
One of the suggested places for Atlantis is around the Azores Islands, a group of islands belonging to Portugal located about 900 miles (1,400 km) west of the Portuguese coast. Some people believe the islands could be the mountain tops of Atlantis. Ignatius L. Donnelly, an American congressman, was perhaps the first one to talk about this possible location in his book Atlantis: The Antediluvian World (1882). Ignatius L. Donnelly also makes a connection to the mythical Aztlán.

Charles Schuchert, in a paper called "Atlantis and the permanency of the North Atlantic Ocean bottom" (1917), discussed a lecture by Pierre-Marie Termier in which Termier suggested "that the entire region north of the Azores and perhaps the very region of the Azores, of which they may be only the visible ruins, was very recently submerged", reporting evidence that an area of 40,000 sq. mi and possibly as large as 200,000 sq. mi. had sunk 10,000 feet below the surface of the Atlantic Ocean. Schuchert's conclusion was:

(1) "that the Azores are volcanic islands and are not the remnants of a more or less large continental mass, for they are not composed of rocks seen on the continents";
(2) "that the tachylytes dredged up from the Atlantic to the north of the Azores were in all probability formed where they are now, at the bottom of the ocean"; and
(3) "that there are no known geologic data that prove or even help to prove the existence of Plato's Atlantis in historic times."

The Azores are steep-sided volcanic seamounts that drop rapidly 1000 meters (about 3300 feet) to a plateau. Cores taken from the plateau and other evidence shows that this area has been an undersea plateau for millions of years. Ancient indicators, i.e. relict beaches, marine deposits, and wave cut-terraces, of Pleistocene shorelines and sea level show that the Azores Islands have not subsided to any significant degree. Instead, they demonstrate that some of these islands have actually risen during the Late and Middle Pleistocene. This is evidenced by relict, Pleistocene wave-cut platforms and beach sediments that now lie well above current sea level. For example, they have been found on Flores Island at elevations of 15–20, 35–45, ~100, and ~250 meters above current sea level.

Three tectonic plates intersect among the Azores, the so-called Azores triple junction.

=== Canary Islands, Madeira and Cape Verde ===
The Canary Islands have been identified as remnants of Atlantis by numerous authors. For example, in 1803, Bory de Saint-Vincent in his Essai sur les îles fortunées et l'antique Atlantide proposed that the Canary Islands, along with the Madeira, and Azores, are what remained after Atlantis broke up. Many later authors, i.e. Lewis Spence in his The Problem of Atlantis, also identified the Canary Islands as part of Atlantis left over from when it sank.

Detailed geomorphic and geologic studies of the Canary Islands clearly demonstrate that over the last 4 million years, they have been steadily uplifted, without any significant periods of subsidence, by geologic processes such as erosional unloading, gravitational unloading, lithospheric flexure induced by adjacent islands, and volcanic underplating. For example, Pliocene pillow lavas, which solidified underwater and now exposed on the northeast flanks of Gran Canaria, have been uplifted between 46 and 143 meters above sea level. Also, marine deposits associated with lavas dated as being 4.1 and 9.3 million years old in Gran Canaria, ca. 4.8 million years old in Fuerteventura, and ca. 9.8 million years old in Lanzarote demonstrate that the Canary Islands have for millions of years undergone long term uplift without any significant, much less catastrophic, subsidence. A series of raised, Pleistocene marine terraces, which become progressively older with increasing elevation, on Fuerteventura indicate that it has risen in elevation at about 1.7 cm per thousand years for the past one million years. The elevation of the marine terrace for the highstand of sea level for the last interglacial period shows that this island has experienced neither subsidence nor significant uplift for the past 125,000 years. Within the Cape Verde Islands, the detailed mapping and dating of 16 Pleistocene marine terraces and Pliocene marine conglomerate found that they have been uplifted throughout most of the Pleistocene and remained relatively stable without any significant subsidence since the last interglacial period. Finally, detailed studies of the sedimentary deposits surrounding the Canary Islands have demonstrated, except for a narrow rim around each island exposed during glacial lowstands of sea level, a complete lack of any evidence for the ocean floor surrounding the Canary Islands having ever been above water.

=== Northern Spain ===
According to Jorge Maria Ribero-Meneses, Atlantis was in northern Spain. He specifically argues that Atlantis is the underwater plateau, known internationally as "Le Danois Bank" and locally as "The Cachucho". It is located about 25 kilometers from the continental shelf and about 60 km off the coast of Asturias, and Lastres between Ribadesella. Its top is now 425 meters below the sea. It is 50 kilometers from east to west and 18 km from north to south. Ribero-Meneses speculated that is part of the continental margin that broke off at least 12000 years ago as the result of tectonic processes that occurred at the end of the last ice age. He argues that they created a tsunami with waves with heights of hundreds of meters and that the few survivors had to start virtually from scratch.

Detailed studies of the geology of the Le Danois Bank region have refuted the proposal by Jorge Maria Ribero-Meneses that the Le Danois Bank was created by the collapse of the northern Cantabrian continental margin about 12,000 years ago. The Le Danois Bank represents part of the continental margin that have been uplifted by thrust faulting when the continental margin overrode oceanic crust during the Paleogene and Neogene periods. Along the northern edge of the Le Danois Bank, Precambrian granulite and Mesozoic sedimentary rocks have been thrust northward over Miocene and Oligocene marine sediments. The basin separating the Le Danois Bank from the Cantabrian continental margin to the south is a graben that simultaneously formed as a result of normal faulting associated with the thrust faulting. In addition, marine sediments that range in age from lower Pliocene to Pleistocene, cover large parts of Le Danois Bank, and fill the basin separating it from the Cantabrian continental margin demonstrate that this bank has been submerged beneath the Bay of Biscay for millions of years.

== Atlantic Ocean: North ==
=== Irish Sea ===
In his book Atlantis of the West: The Case For Britain's Drowned Megalithic Civilization (2003), Paul Dunbavin argues that a large island once existed in the Irish Sea and that this island was Atlantis. He argues that this Neolithic civilization in Europe was partially drowned by rising sea levels caused by a comet impact that caused a pole shift and changed the Earth's axis around 3100 BC. Such changes would be readily detectable to modern science, however, and Dunbavin's claims are considered pseudo-scientific at best within the scientific community.

=== Great Britain ===
William Comyns Beaumont believed that Great Britain was the location of Atlantis and the Scottish journalist Lewis Spence claimed that the ancient traditions of Britain and Ireland contain memories of Atlantis.

On December 29, 1997, the BBC reported that a team of Russian scientists believed they found Atlantis in the ocean 100 miles off of Land's End, Cornwall, Britain. The BBC stated that Little Sole Bank, a relatively shallow area, was believed by the team to be the capital of Atlantis. This may have been based on the myth of Lyonesse.

=== Ireland ===
The idea of Atlantis being located in Ireland was presented in the book Atlantis from a Geographer's Perspective: Mapping the Fairy Land (2004) by Swedish geographer Dr. Ulf Erlingsson from Uppsala University. Erlingsson claimed that the empire of Atlantis refers to the Neolithic Megalithic tomb culture, based on their similar geographic extent, and deduced that the island of Atlantis then must correspond to Ireland.

=== North Sea ===
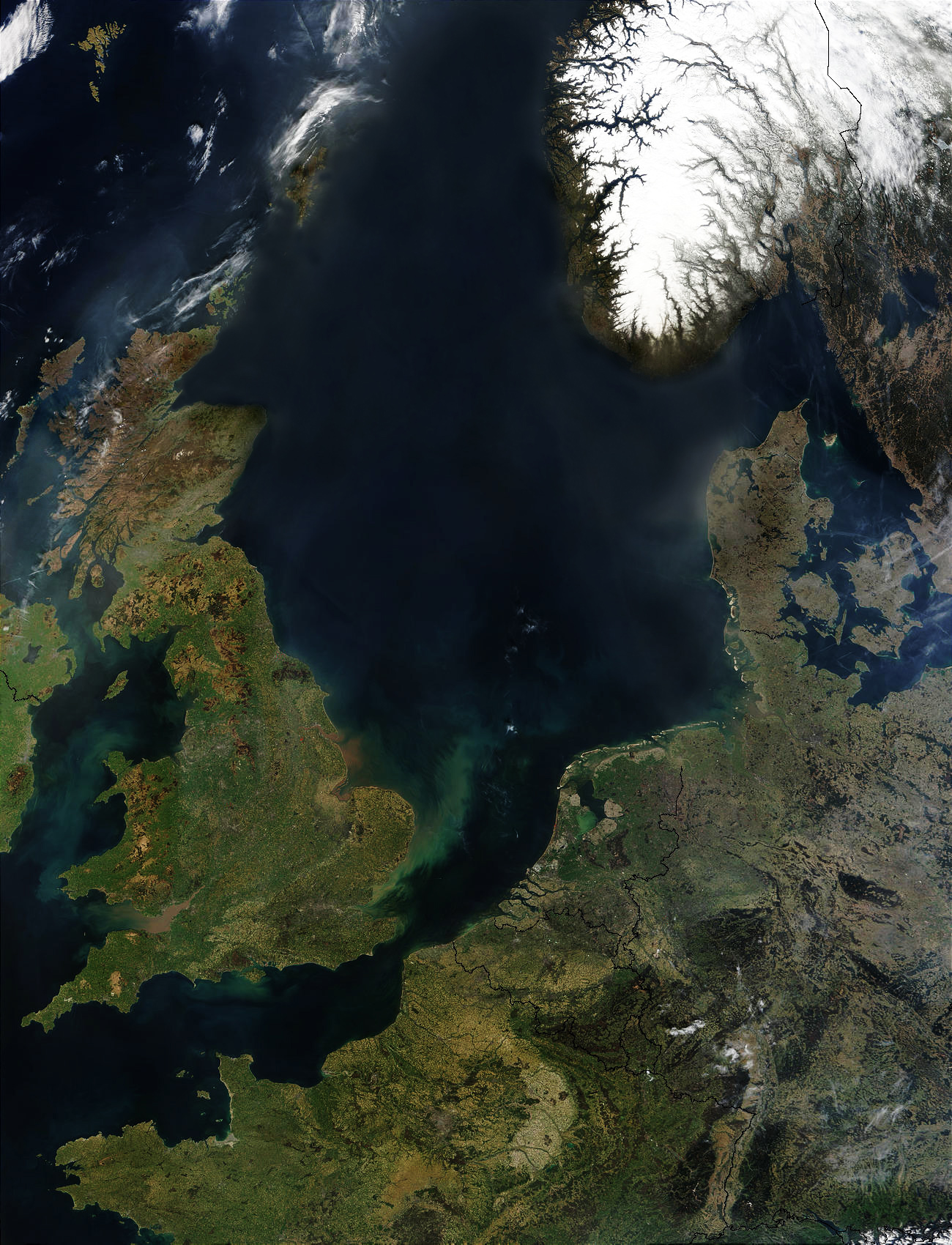
Satellite image of the North Sea, which has also been suggested as the location of Atlantis

The North Sea is known to contain lands that were once above water; the medieval town of Dunwich in East Anglia, for example, crumbled into the sea. The land area known as "Doggerland", between England and Denmark, was inundated by a tsunami around 8200BP (6200BC), caused by a submarine landslide off the coast of Norway known as the Storegga Slide, and prehistoric human remains have been dredged up from the Dogger Bank. Atlantis itself has been identified besides Heligoland off the north-west German coast by the author Jürgen Spanuth, who postulates that it was destroyed during the Bronze Age around 1200 BC, only to partially re-emerge during the Iron Age. Ulf Erlingsson believes that the island that sank referred to Dogger Bank, and the city itself referred to the Silverpit crater at the base of Dogger Bank.

=== Denmark ===
In his book The Celts: The People Who Came Out of the Darkness (1975), author Gerhard Herm links the origins of the Atlanteans to the end of the ice age and the flooding of eastern coastal Denmark.

=== Sweden ===
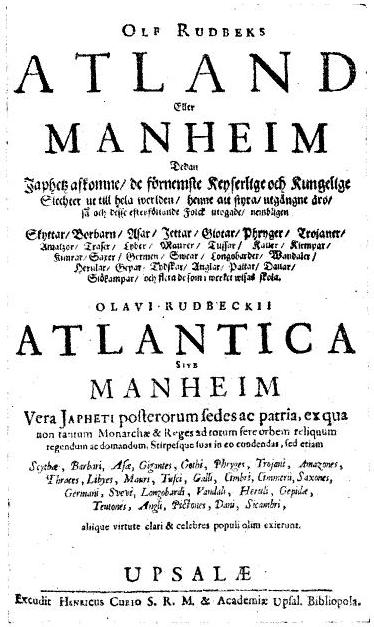
Olaus Rudbeck's Atlantica

In 1679 Olaus Rudbeck wrote Atlantis (Atlantica), where he argues that Scandinavia, specifically Sweden, is identical with Atlantis. According to Rudbeck the capital city of Atlantis was identical to the ancient burial site of Swedish kings Gamla Uppsala.

== Americas ==
Until the discovery of the New World many scholars believed that Atlantis was either a metaphor for teaching philosophy, or just attributed the story to Plato without connecting the island with a real location. When Columbus returned from his voyage to the west historians began identifying the Americas with Atlantis. The first was Francisco López de Gómara, who in 1552 thought that what Columbus had discovered was the Atlantic Island of Plato.

In 1556 Agustin de Zárate speculated that Atlantis once linked America and Europe and that it was as a result of Plato that the new continent was discovered. He also said it had all the attributes of the continent described by Plato yet at the same time mentioned that the ancient peoples crossed over by a route from the island of Atlantis. Zarate also mentions that the 9,000 "years" of Plato were 9,000 "months" (750 years).

This was also repeated and clarified by historian Pedro Sarmiento de Gamboa in 1572 in his "History of the Incas", who by calculation of longitude stated that Atlantis must have stretched from within two leagues of the strait of Gibraltar westwards to include "all the rest of the land from the mouth of the Marañon (Amazon River) and Brazil to the South Sea, which is what they now call America." He thought the sunken part to be now in the Atlantic Ocean but that it was from this sunken part that the original Indians had come to populate Peru via one continuous land mass.

It first appeared as the Atlantic Island (Insula Atlantica) on a map of the New World by cartographer Sebastian Münster in 1540 and again on the map titled Atlantis Insula by Nicolas Sanson and son (1669) which identified both North and South America as "Atlantis Insula", the eastern part of the Atlantic Ocean as "Oceanus Atlanticus" and the western part of the Atlantic Ocean plus the Pacific Ocean as "Atlanticum Pelagus". This edition was further embellished with features from the Atlantis legend by his son Guillaume Sanson including the names of the ten kings of Atlantis with Atlas' portion being in Mexico. Sanson's map supposedly showed what the earth looked like 200,000 years before there were any humans on it.

Francis Bacon and Alexander von Humboldt also identified America with Atlantis; Janus Joannes Bircherod said in 1663 orbe novo non novo ("the New World is not new").

== Antarctica ==
The idea that Antarctica was Atlantis was particularly fashionable during the 1960s and 1970s, spurred on partly both by the isolation of the continent, and also the Piri Reis map, which purportedly shows Antarctica as it would be ice free, suggesting human knowledge of that period. Flavio Barbiero, Charles Berlitz, Erich Von Däniken and Peter Kolosimo are some of the popular authors who made this proposal.

Starting in 1958, Charles Hapgood began to outline his "Earth Crustal Displacement" arguing that Earth's outer crust is able to move upon the upper mantle layer very rapidly. He believed that Antarctica had been habitable within some 10,000 years in the past on this basis. At the time, continental drift was still controversial and plate tectonics would not be verified until the 1970s, with a proliferation of geological ideas abounding and no clear answer to lingering mysteries in Earth science, Albert Einstein was intrigued enough by Hapgood's ideas to write the preface for his book Earth's shifting crust. This proposal has remained particularly popular with Hollow Earthers, and mirrors the Hyperborean identification. In his book "Fingerprints of the Gods", author Graham Hancock argues for Hapgood's proposals in general, and the Atlantis/Antarctica connection specifically, then goes on to propose archaeological exploration of Antarctica in search of Atlantis.

More recently Rose and Rand Flem-Ath have continued to argue in favor of this idea in their book, When the Sky Fell; revising it and making it more specific in Flem-Ath's work with author Colin Wilson, in The Atlantis Blueprint (published in 2002). The second book speculated that Atlantis was to be found in Lesser Antarctica, near the coast of the Ross Ice Shelf.

== North Pole ==
The professor of systematic theology at Boston University William Fairfield Warren (1833–1929) wrote a book promoting his idea that the original centre of mankind once sat at the North Pole entitled Paradise Found: The Cradle of the Human Race at the North Pole (1885). In this work Warren placed Atlantis at the North Pole, as well as the Garden of Eden, Mount Meru, Avalon and Hyperborea. Warren believed all these mythical lands were folk memories of a former inhabited far northern seat where man was originally created.

== See also ==
- Bimini Road
- Atlantology (in Russian)
