= Zanclean flood =

Theoretical refilling of the Mediterranean Sea between the Miocene and Pliocene Epochs

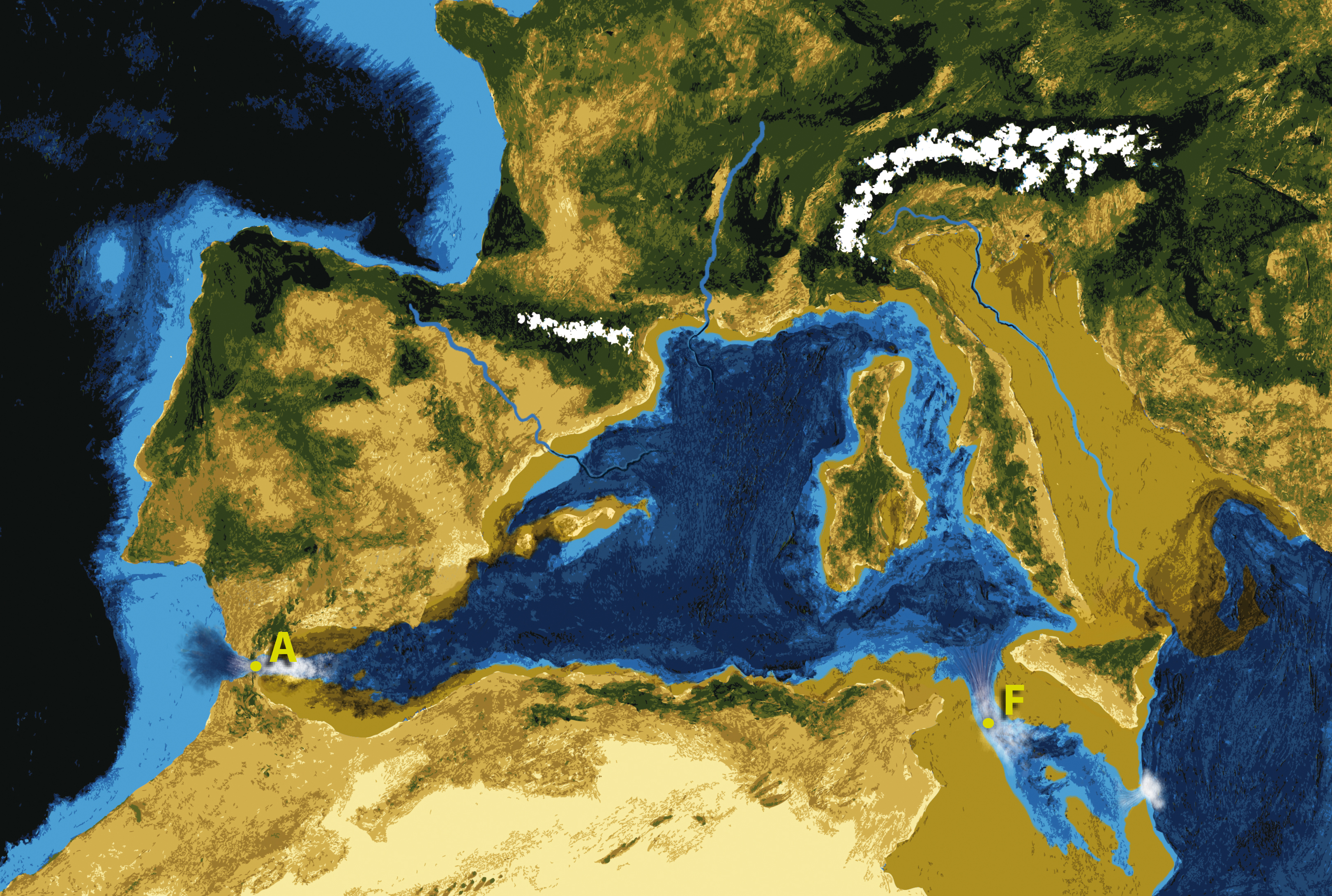
Artistic interpretation of the flooding of the Mediterranean through the Strait of Gibraltar (A) and the Strait of Sicily (F) about 5.3 million years ago

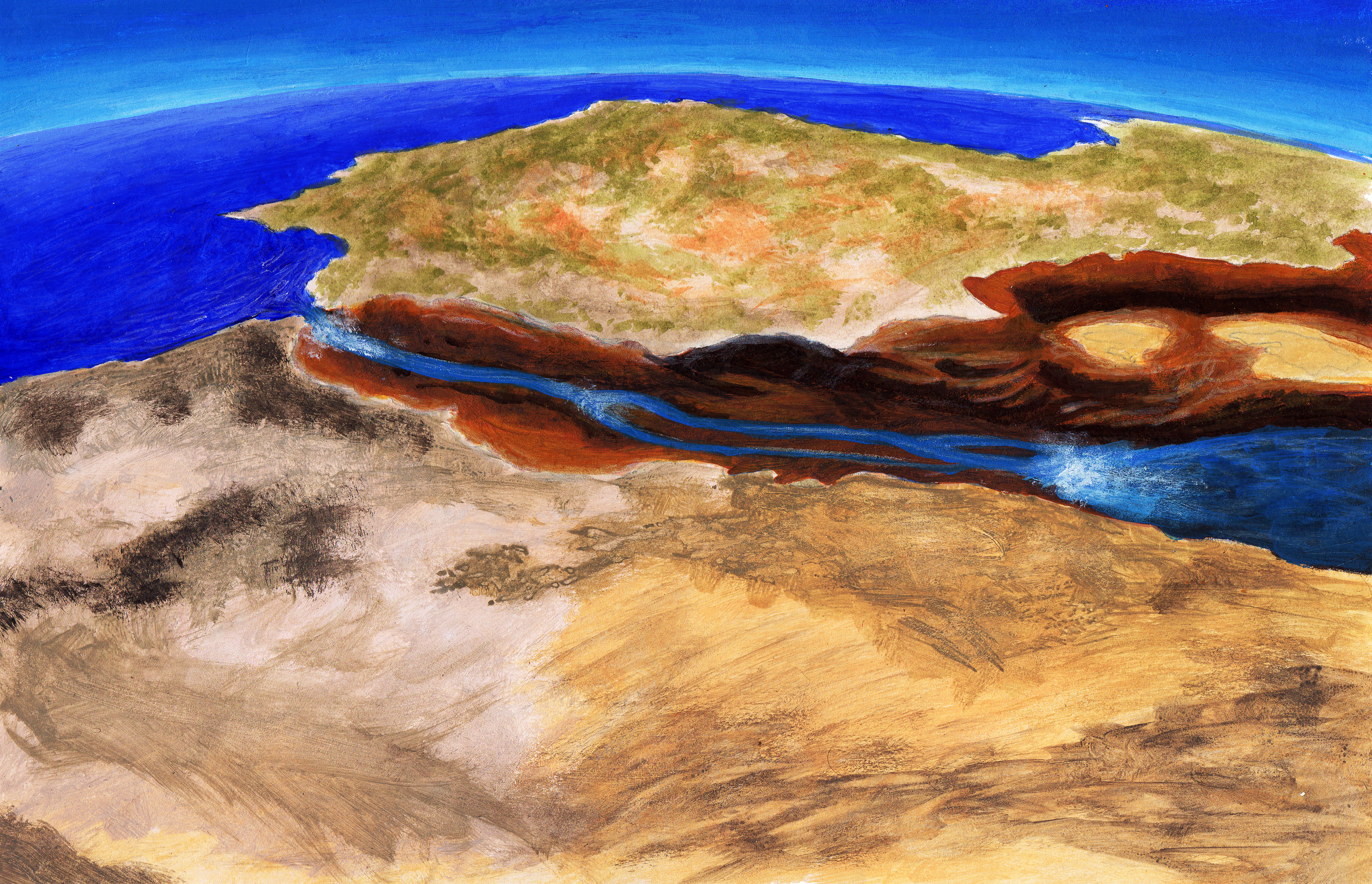
Artistic interpretation of the flooding of the Mediterranean through the Strait of Gibraltar

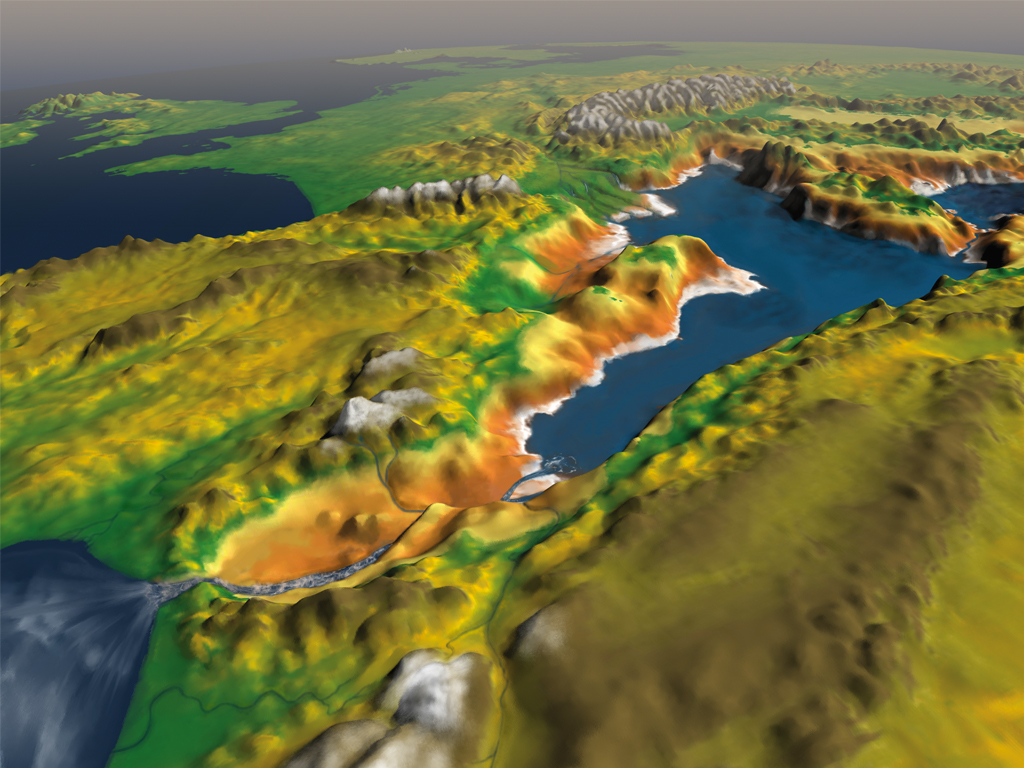
Computer simulation of the flooding of the Mediterranean through the Strait of Gibraltar, with the vertical scale exaggerated for better visualization. The view in this image is from the southwest of Gibraltar, with the future Iberian Peninsula in the center-left, northwest Africa in the lower-right. The coastlines of Northern Europe in the top of this image do not correspond to the time period in question.

The Zanclean flood, or Zanclean deluge, is theorized to have refilled the Mediterranean Sea 5.33 million years ago. This flooding ended the Messinian salinity crisis and reconnected the Mediterranean Sea to the Atlantic Ocean, although it is possible that even before the flood there were partial connections to the Atlantic Ocean. The re-connection marks the beginning of the Zanclean age, the earliest age on the geologic time scale of the Pliocene.

According to this model, water from the Atlantic Ocean refilled the dried-up basin through the modern-day Strait of Gibraltar. Ninety percent of the Mediterranean Basin flooding occurred abruptly during a period estimated to have been between several months and two years, following low water discharges that could have lasted for several thousand years. Sea level rise in the basin may at times have reached rates greater than 10 metres per day (5 fathom/d; 30 ft/d). Based on the erosion features preserved until modern times under the Pliocene sediment, Garcia-Castellanos et al. estimate that water rushed down a drop of more than 1,000 metres (3,300 ft) with a maximum discharge of about 100 million cubic metres per second (3.5 billion cubic feet per second; 81,000 acre-feet per second), three orders of magnitude larger than the present-day Amazon River. Studies of the underground structures at the Strait of Gibraltar show that the flooding channel descended gradually toward the bottom of the basin rather than forming a steep waterfall.

== Background ==
The geologic history of the Mediterranean is governed by plate tectonics involving the African Plate, the Arabian Plate and the Eurasian Plate which shrank the previously existing Tethys Ocean until its western part became the present-day Mediterranean. For reasons not clearly established, during the late Miocene the Mediterranean was severed from the Atlantic Ocean. It partly dried up when the Guadalhorce and Rifian corridors that had previously connected the Mediterranean to the Atlantic closed. This triggered the Messinian Salinity Crisis with the formation of thick salt deposits on the former seafloor and erosion of the continental slopes. The Nile and Rhône carved deep canyons during this time. Water levels in the Mediterranean during this time dropped by kilometres. The exact magnitude of the drop, and whether it was symmetric between the Western Mediterranean and the Eastern Mediterranean, is unclear; it is possible that interconnected seas remained on the floor of the Mediterranean.

The presence of Atlantic fish in Messinian deposits and the volume of salt deposited during the Messinian Salinity Crisis implies that there was some remnant flow from the Atlantic into the Mediterranean even before the Zanclean flood. Already before the Zanclean flood, increased precipitation and runoff had lowered the salinity of the remnant sea, leading to the deposition of the so-called "Lago Mare" sediments. Fluctuations in water levels may have taken place, with water originating in the Paratethys north of the Mediterranean through waterbody capture processes.

== Event ==
The Zanclean flood occurred when the Strait of Gibraltar opened. Tectonic subsidence of the Gibraltar region may have lowered the sill until it breached. The exact triggering event is not known with certainty; faulting and sea level rise are debatable. The most widely accepted hypothesis is that a stream flowing into the Mediterranean eroded through the Strait of Gibraltar until it captured the Atlantic Ocean and that the Strait did not exist before this erosion event.

During the flood, a channel formed across the Strait of Gibraltar, which starts at the Camarinal Sill in the Strait of Gibraltar. The channel is eroded into the seafloor of the Alboran Sea, splits around the Vizconde de Eza high of the Alboran Sea and eventually connects with the Alboran Channel before splitting into several branches that end in the Algero-Balear basin. The channel has a U-like shape in its starting region, which is consistent with its formation during a giant flood. The formation of the channel mobilized about 1,000 cubic kilometres (240 cu mi) of rock, which was deposited in the Alboran Sea in the form of giant submarine bars. The sector of the Zanclean channel that passes through the Camarinal Sill may have a different origin, however.

Elsewhere, the levels of the world's oceans dropped by approximately 10 metres (33 ft) as the Atlantic flowed into the Mediterranean, and every other ocean backfilled the Atlantic.

Whether the Zanclean flood occurred gradually or as a catastrophic event is controversial, but it was instantaneous by geological standards. The magnitude of a catastrophic flood has been simulated by modelling. One single-dimensional model assumes a catastrophic flood of more than 10–100 sverdrup. (Note: 1 sverdrup is 1,000,000 cubic metres per second. Total outflow of all rivers is about 1.2 sverdrup.) Another estimate assumes that after the first breach of the sill, the flowing water eroded the threshold and formed the channel across the Strait of Gibraltar, increasing the flow of water which in turn increased the erosion until water levels rose enough in the Mediterranean to slow the flood.

In such a scenario, a peak discharge of over 100,000,000 cubic metres per second (3.5×10^{9} cu ft/s) occurred with water velocities of over 40 metres per second (131 ft/s; 144 km/h; 89 mph); such flow rates are about 450 times larger than the discharge of the Amazon River and ten times as much as the Missoula floods. This flood would have descended a relatively gentle ramp into the Mediterranean basin, not as a giant waterfall. Later simulations using more explicit geography constrain the flow to about 100 sverdrup or 100,000,000 cubic metres per second (3.5×10^{9} cu ft/s). They further indicate the formation of large gyres in the Alboran Sea during the flooding and that the flood eroded the Camarinal Sill at a rate of 0.4–0.7 metres per day (1.3–2.3 ft/d). The exact size of the flood depends on the pre-flood water levels in the Mediterranean and higher water levels there would result in a much smaller flood.

The flood affected only the Western Mediterranean at first, because the Malta Escarpment (located at the present Straits of Sicily) formed a barrier separating its basin from the Eastern Mediterranean basin that probably overflowed through the Noto Canyon across the Malta Escarpment; in addition a sill may have existed in the eastern Alboran Sea at this time. During the flooding across the Noto Canyon, vortices and reverse flows occurred, and large amounts of sediments were emplaced in the Ionian Sea. While it was at first assumed that the filling of the eastern Mediterranean would have taken thousands of years, later estimates of the size of the Strait of Gibraltar channel implied that it would have taken much less, potentially less than a year until reconnection.

A large flood is not the only explanation for the reconnection of the Mediterranean with the Atlantic and concomitant environmental changes; more gradual reflooding of the Mediterranean including reflooding through other water sources is also possible, or a persistently open Strait of Gibraltar. The absence of a catastrophic flooding event is supported by geological evidence found along the southern margin of the Alboran Sea. On the other hand, deposits found around the Malta Escarpment imply that one intense flood led to the reconnection across the Straits of Sicily.

=== Timing ===
The timing of the Zanclean flood is uncertain, with one possibility being a flood around 5.33 million years ago; the end of the Messinian/Miocene and beginning of the Zanclean/Pliocene is usually associated with the flood. The main Zanclean flood may have been preceded by an earlier smaller flood event, and the presence of deep sea terraces has been used to infer that the refilling of the Mediterranean occurred in several pulses. Complete refilling of the Mediterranean may have taken about a decade.

== Consequences ==
The Zanclean flood created the Strait of Gibraltar; it is doubtful that tectonic or volcanic events could have created the strait since the main plate boundaries do not run through the strait and there is little seismic activity in its area. The current morphology of the strait is characterized by two aquatic sills: the Camarinal Sill, which is 284 m (932 ft) at its deepest point, and the deeper Espartel Sill farther west. The narrowest part of the strait is located east of either sill, and it is considerably deeper than the sills. It is possible that these sills were formed after the flood through gravity-induced movement of neighbouring terrain.

The Zanclean flood caused a major change in the environment of the Mediterranean basin; the continental "Lago Mare" facies was replaced by Zanclean deep sea deposits. The flood may have affected global climate, considering that the much smaller flood triggered when Lake Agassiz drained did result in a cold period. The hypothesized remote effects reached as far as the Loyalty Ridge next to New Caledonia in the Southern Hemisphere.

Rising sea levels made the deeply incised Nile river become a ria as far inland as Aswan, some 900 km (560 mi) upstream from the modern coast. The Zanclean flood resulted in the final isolation of numerous Mediterranean islands such as Crete and ecosystem disruption, resulting in speciation of plants and animals found there. On the other hand, the formation of the Strait of Gibraltar prevented land animals from crossing over between Africa and Europe. Further the reconnection allowed sea animals (cetaceans and their ancestors, pinnipeds and others) to colonize the Mediterranean from the Atlantic.

Evidence of the flooding has been obtained on Zanclean-age sediments, both in boreholes and in sediments that were subsequently uplifted and raised above sea level. A sharp erosional surface separates the pre-Zanclean flood surface from the younger deposits, which are always marine in origin.

The waters flooding into the Western Mediterranean probably overspilled into the Ionian Sea through Sicily and the Noto submarine canyon off Avola; the spillover flood had a magnitude comparable to the flood in the Strait of Gibraltar. The rates at which the Mediterranean filled during the flood were more than enough to trigger substantial induced seismicity. Resulting large landslides would have sufficed to create large tsunamis with wave heights reaching 100 m (330 ft), evidence of which has been found in the Algeciras Basin. The infilling of the basin created tectonic stresses, which would have influenced the development of the Apennine Mountains.

== Similar megafloods ==
Similar floods have occurred elsewhere on Earth throughout history; examples include the Bonneville flood in North America, during which Lake Bonneville overflowed through Red Rock Pass into the Snake River Basin, and the Black Sea deluge hypothesis that postulates a flood from the Mediterranean into the Black Sea through the Bosporus.

== Research history ==
In his book Historia Naturalis, Pliny the Elder mentions a legend that Hercules dug the Strait of Gibraltar between the Mediterranean and the Atlantic Ocean, connecting the two. The actual Zanclean flood theory however only arose during the 1970s, when it became clear that salt deposits and a widespread erosion surface in the Mediterranean had been emplaced during a prolonged sea level lowstand, and that the subsequent reflooding took place in only a few millennia or less.

== See also ==
- Black Sea deluge hypothesis – hypothetical flood scenario
- Outburst flood – high-magnitude, low-frequency catastrophic flood involving the sudden release of water
