= Camarinal Sill =

Seafloor barrier between the Atlantic and Mediterranean

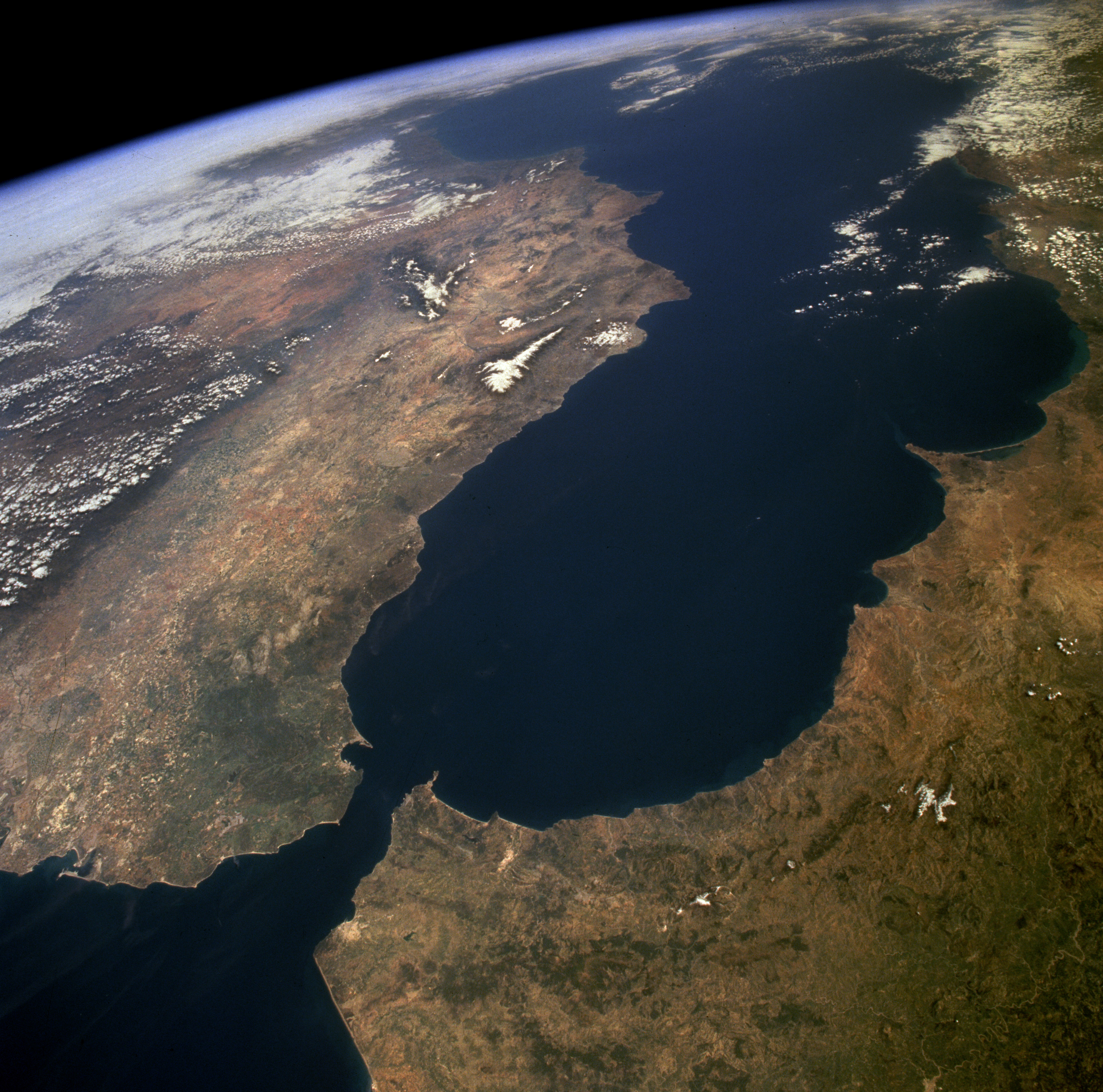
The Strait of Gibraltar as seen from space.

Natural Flow over the Camarinal Sill

The Camarinal Sill is the sill separating the Mediterranean Sea and the Atlantic Ocean. This threshold is the shallowest seafloor pass between the Iberian Peninsula and Africa. It is located approximately 25 km west of the narrowest section of the Strait of Gibraltar and 20 km east of the Espartel Sill, at 35°56′N 5°45′W, at a depth of 280 m.

Its formation is linked to the Zanclean flood and the termination of the Messinian salinity crisis, when the Mediterranean was abruptly refilled through the Strait of Gibraltar, excavating the 900-metre-deep gorge that lies underneath the water. A competing hypothesis suggests that both the gorge and the Camarinal Sill are the result of fluvial erosion during the desiccation of the Mediterranean (Messinian salinity crisis).

Marine waters must climb to that depth when flowing between both ocean domains. During World War II, submarines used the upper inflow current and the lower outflow current to go in and out of the Mediterranean Sea without using their engines, to avoid being noticed from the surface.

The sill is proposed to be the location of a hypothetical Strait of Gibraltar tunnel.
