= Heat content =

Heat content may refer to:

- Enthalpy, measure of energy in a thermodynamic system
- Heat of combustion, amount of heat released by combustion of a quantity of substance
- Ocean heat content, thermal energy stored in ocean water
- Heat content (fuel), industrial term for heat energy available from a unit of fuel
