= Topographic steering =

In fluid mechanics, topographic steering is the effect of potential vorticity conservation on the motion of a fluid parcel. This means that the fluid parcels will not only react to physical obstacles in their path, but also to changes in topography or latitude. The two types of 'fluids' where topographic steering is mainly observed in daily life are air (air can be considered a compressible fluid in fluid mechanics) and water in respectively the atmosphere and the oceans. Examples of topographic steering can be found in, among other things, paths of low pressure systems and oceanic currents.

In 1869, Kelvin published his circulation theorem, which states that a barotropic, ideal fluid with conservative body forces conserves the circulation around a closed loop. To generalise this, Bjerknes published his own circulation theorem in 1898. Bjerknes extended the concept to inviscid, geostrophic and baroclinic fluids, resulting in addition of terms in the equation.

== Mathematical description ==
=== Circulation ===
The exact mathematical description of the different potential vorticities can all be obtained from the circulation theorem of Bjerkness, which is stated as

$$\frac{DC}{Dt}=\int_A \frac{\nabla\rho\times\nabla p}{\rho^2}\cdot dA - 2\Omega\frac{DA_e}{Dt}$$.

Here $C$ is the circulation, the line integral of the velocity along a closed contour. Also, $D/Dt$ is the material derivative, $\rho$ is the density, $p$ is the pressure, $\Omega$ is the angular velocity of the frame of reference and $A_e$ is the area projection of the closed contour onto the equatorial plane. This means the bigger the angle between the contour and the equatorial plane, the smaller this projection becomes.

The formula states that the change of the circulation along a fluid's path is affected by the variation of density in pressure coordinates and by the change in equatorial projection of the contour. Kelvin assumed both a barotropic fluid and a constant projection. Under these assumptions the right hand side of the equation is zero and Kelvin's theorem is found.

=== Shallow water ===
When considering a relatively thin layer of fluid of constant density, with on the bottom a topography and on top a free surface, the shallow water approximation can be used. Using this approximation, Rossby showed in 1939, by integrating the shallow water equations over the depth of the fluid, that

$\frac{D}{Dt}\left(\frac{\zeta+f}{h}\right)=0$. (1)

Here $\zeta$ is the relative vorticity, $f$ is the Coriolis parameter and $h$ is the height of the water layer. The quantity inside the material derivative was later called the shallow water potential vorticity.

=== Layered atmosphere ===
When considering an atmosphere with multiple layers of constant potential temperature, the quasi-2D shallow water equations on a beta plane can be used. In 1940, Rossby used this to show that

$\frac{D}{Dt}\left(\frac{\zeta_\theta+f}{\Delta}\right)=0$. (2)

Here $\zeta_\theta$ is the relative vorticity on an isentropic surface, $f$ is the Coriolis parameter and $\Delta=\delta p/g$ is a quantity measuring the weight of unit cross-section of an individual air column in the layer. This last quantity can also be seen as a measure of the vortex depth. The potential vorticity defined here is also called the Rossby potential vorticity.

=== Continuous atmosphere ===
When the approximation of the discrete layers is relaxed and the fluid becomes continuous, another potential vorticity can be defined which is conserved. It was shown by Ertel in 1942 that

$\frac{D}{Dt}\left(\frac{\zeta_a\cdot\nabla\theta}{\rho}\right)=0$. (3)

Here $\zeta_a$ is the absolute vorticity, $\nabla\theta$ is the gradient in potential temperature and $\rho$ the density. This potential vorticity is also called the Ertel potential vorticity.

To get to this result, first recall the circulation theorem from Kelvin

$$\frac{DC}{Dt}=0$$.

If the coordinate system is transformed to that of the local tangent plane coordinates and we use potential temperature as the vertical coordinate, the equation can be slightly rewritten to

$$\frac{D}{Dt}\left(C+f\delta A\right)=0$$.

Where now $C$ is the local circulation in the frame of reference, $f$ is the Coriolis parameter and $\delta A$ is the area on an isentropic surface over which the circulation $C$.

Because the local circulation can be approximated as a product between the area and the relative vorticity on the isentropic surface, the circulation equation yields

$$\frac{D}{Dt}\left(\delta A\left(\zeta_\theta+f\right)\right)=0$$.

When a fluid parcel is between two isentropic layers and the pressure difference between these layers increases, the fluid parcel is 'stretched'. This is because it wants to conserve the potential temperature at each side of the parcel. To conserve the mass, this horizontally thins the fluid parcel while it is vertically stretched. So the area of the isentropic surface, $\delta A$, is a function of how quickly the lines of equal potential temperature change with pressure:

$$\delta A=Const*g\left(-\frac{\partial\theta}{\partial p}\right)$$.

In the end this yields

$$\frac{D}{Dt}\left(\frac{\zeta_\theta+f}{-g\frac{\partial\theta}{\partial p}}\right)=0$$,

which is exactly the result found by Ertel, written in a slightly different way. Note that when assuming a layered atmosphere, the gradient in the potential temperature becomes an absolute difference and the result from Kelvin for a layered atmosphere can be found. Also note that when the fluid is incompressible, the layer depth becomes a measure for the change in potential temperature. Then the result for shallow water potential vorticity can be extracted again.

== Effect ==
The different definitions of potential vorticity conservation, resulting from different approximations, can be used to explain phenomena observed here on earth. Fluid parcels will move along lines of constant potential vorticity.

=== Oceans ===
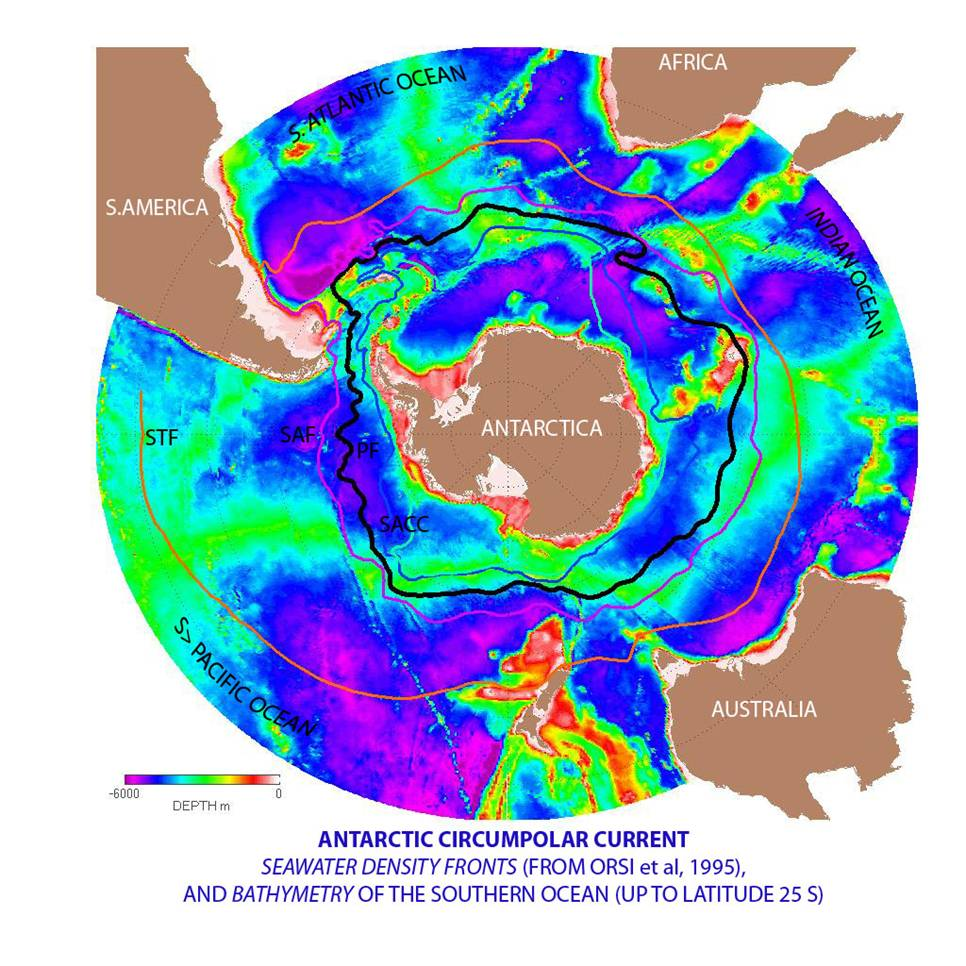
Antarctic Circumpolar Current. The lines indicate the path of the current and the colours indicate the depth of the ocean floor.

Because the scale of large flows in the oceans is much larger than the depth of the ocean, the shallow water approximation and thus (1) can often be used. On top of that, the changes in relative vorticity are very small with respect to the changes in the Coriolis parameter. The direct result of that is that for a fluid parcel a change in ocean floor depth will have to be compensated by a change in latitude. In both hemispheres this means that a rising ocean floor, so a decrease in water depth, results in a deflection equatorwards.

This phenomenon can explain different currents found on earth. One of them is the specific path the water takes in the Antarctic Circumpolar Current. This path is not a straight line, but curves according to the bathymetry.

Another one is the water flowing through the Luzon Strait. Researchers Metzger and Hurlburt showed that the existence of three small shoals can explain the deflection of the current away from the strait instead of flowing through the strait.

=== Atmosphere ===
In the atmosphere, topographic steering can also be observed. In most cases, the simple modeled layer of the atmosphere and thus (2) can explain the phenomena. When an isentropic layer flows zonally from west to east over a mountain, the topographic steering can create a wave-like pattern on the lee-side and eventually form an alternating pattern of ridges and troughs.

Upon approach of the mountain, the layer depth will increase slightly. This is because the incline of the isentropic surfaces is less steep at the top of the layer than at the bottom. When the layer depth increases, the change in potential vorticity is countered by an increase in relative vorticity as well as the Coriolis parameter. The vortex will begin to move away from the equator and begin to rotate cyclonically.

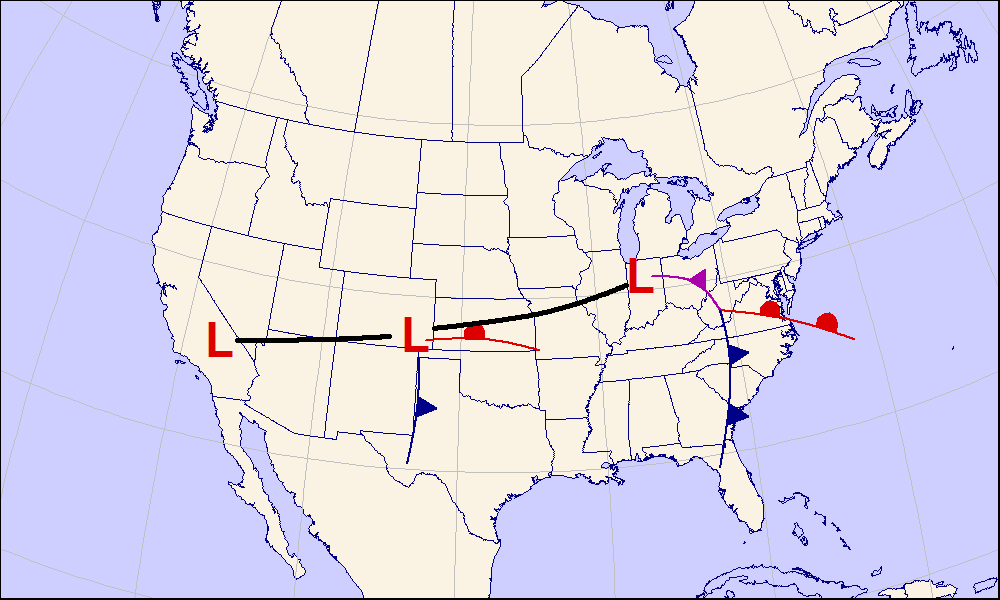
Usual path of Colorado lows observed in the United States. The 'L' indicate the position of the low pressure system, with the blue and red lines respectively indicating the warm and cold fronts.

During the crossing of the mountain, the effect is reversed due to the shrinking of the layer depth. The vortex will rotate anti-cyclonically and move towards the equator. As the vortex leaves the mountain, the resulting latitude is closer to the equator than before. This means vortices will have a cyclonic rotation on the lee-side of the mountain and be turning northwards. The Coriolis parameter and relative vorticity increase and decrease in antiphase. This results in an alternation of cyclonic and anti-cyclonic flows after the mountain. The change in the Coriolis parameter and relative vorticity work against each other, creating a wave-like phenomenon.

When looking at zonal flow from east to west, this effect is not occurring. This is because the change in the Coriolis parameter and the change in relative vorticity work in the same direction. The flow will return to zonal again some time after crossing the mountain.

The effect described is often credited as the source of the tendency of cyclogenesis on lee-sides of mountains. One example of this are the so-called Colorado lows, troughs originating from air passing over the Rocky Mountains.

== See also ==
- Potential vorticity
- Circulation (physics)
- Kelvin's circulation theorem
- Shallow water equations
