= Ocean heat content =

Energy stored by oceans

The ocean heat content (OHC) has been increasing for decades as the ocean has been absorbing most of the excess heat resulting from greenhouse gas emissions from human activities. The graph shows OHC calculated to a water depth of 700 and 2000 meters.

Ocean heat content (OHC) or ocean heat uptake (OHU) is the energy absorbed and stored by oceans. It is an important indicator of global warming. Ocean heat content is calculated by measuring ocean temperature at many different locations and depths, and integrating the areal density of a change in enthalpic energy over an ocean basin or entire ocean.

Between 1971 and 2018, a steady upward trend in ocean heat content accounted for over 90% of Earth's excess energy from global warming. Scientists estimate a 1961–2022 warming trend of 0.43 ± 0.08 W/m², accelerating at about 0.15 ± 0.04 W/m² per decade. By 2020, about one third of the added energy had propagated to depths below 700 meters. The five highest ocean heat observations to a depth of 2000 meters all occurred in the period 2020–2024. The main driver of this increase has been human-caused greenhouse gas emissions.

Ocean heat content measurements are critical for models of climate. Since before 1960, research vessels and stations have sampled sea surface temperatures and temperatures at greater depth all over the world. Since 2000, an expanding network of nearly 4000 Argo robotic floats has measured temperature anomalies, or the change in ocean heat content. The upper 2000 meters of the global ocean has experienced warming on average since the 1970s, while the rate of warming varies regionally with the subpolar North Atlantic warming more slowly and the Southern Ocean taking up a disproportionately large amount of heat. Deep-ocean warming below 2000 meters has also been largest in the Southern Ocean compared to other ocean basins.

Changes in ocean temperature greatly affect ecosystems in oceans and on land. For example, there are multiple impacts on coastal ecosystems and communities relying on their ecosystem services. Direct effects include variations in sea level and sea ice, changes to the intensity of the water cycle, and the migration of marine life.

== Role in climate stability ==
The Earth's oceans play a critical role in climate stability. The oceans have high heat capacity so they can store vast amounts of energy with little change in temperature. Oceans also cover 70% of the Earth's surface. Measuring ocean heat content and monitoring changes over time is essential for understanding and modeling climate.

== Definition ==
Chart of different thermoclines (depth versus ocean temperature) based on seasons and latitude

Ocean heat content is a term used in physical oceanography to describe a type of thermodynamic potential energy that is stored in the ocean. It is defined in coordination with the equation of state of seawater. TEOS-10 is an international standard approved in 2010 by the Intergovernmental Oceanographic Commission.

== Calculations ==
Calculation of ocean heat content follows that of enthalpy referenced to the ocean surface, also called potential enthalpy. OHC changes are thus made more readily comparable to seawater heat exchanges with ice, freshwater, and humid air. OHC is always reported as a change or as an "anomaly" relative to a baseline. Positive values then also quantify ocean heat uptake (OHU) and are useful to diagnose where most of planetary energy gains from global heating are going.

To calculate the ocean heat content, measurements of ocean temperature from sample parcels of seawater gathered at many different locations and depths are required. Integrating the areal density of ocean heat over an ocean basin, or entire ocean, gives the total ocean heat content. Thus, total ocean heat content is a volume integral of the product of temperature, density, and heat capacity over the three-dimensional region of the ocean for which data is available. The bulk of measurements have been performed at depths shallower than about 2000 m (1.25 miles).

The areal density of ocean heat content between two depths is computed as a definite integral:

$H= c_p \int_{h2}^{h1} \rho(z) \Theta(z) dz$

where $c_p$ is the specific heat capacity of sea water, $h_2$ is the lower depth, $h_1$ is the upper depth, $\rho(z)$ is the in-situ seawater density profile, and $\Theta(z)$ is the conservative temperature profile. $c_p$ is defined at a single depth h0 usually chosen as the ocean surface. In SI units, $H$ has units of Joules per square metre (J·m^{−2}).

In practice, the integral can be approximated by summation using a smooth and otherwise well-behaved sequence of in-situ data; including temperature (t), pressure (p), salinity (s) and their corresponding density (ρ). Conservative temperature $\Theta(z)$ are translated values relative to the reference pressure (p0) at h0. A substitute known as potential temperature has been used in earlier calculations.

Measurements of temperature versus ocean depth generally show an upper mixed layer (0–200 m), a thermocline (200–1500 m), and a deep ocean layer (>1500 m). These boundary depths are only rough approximations. Sunlight penetrates to a maximum depth of about 200 m; the top 80 m of which is the habitable zone for photosynthetic marine life covering over 70% of Earth's surface. Wave action and other surface turbulence help to equalize temperatures throughout the upper layer.

Unlike surface temperatures which decrease with latitude, deep-ocean temperatures are relatively cold and uniform in most regions of the world. About 50% of all ocean volume is at depths below 3000 m (1.85 miles), with the Pacific Ocean being the largest and deepest of five oceanic divisions. The thermocline is the transition between upper and deep layers in terms of temperature, nutrient flows, abundance of life, and other properties. It is semi-permanent in the tropics, variable in temperate regions (often deepest during the summer), and shallow to nonexistent in polar regions.

=== Measurements ===
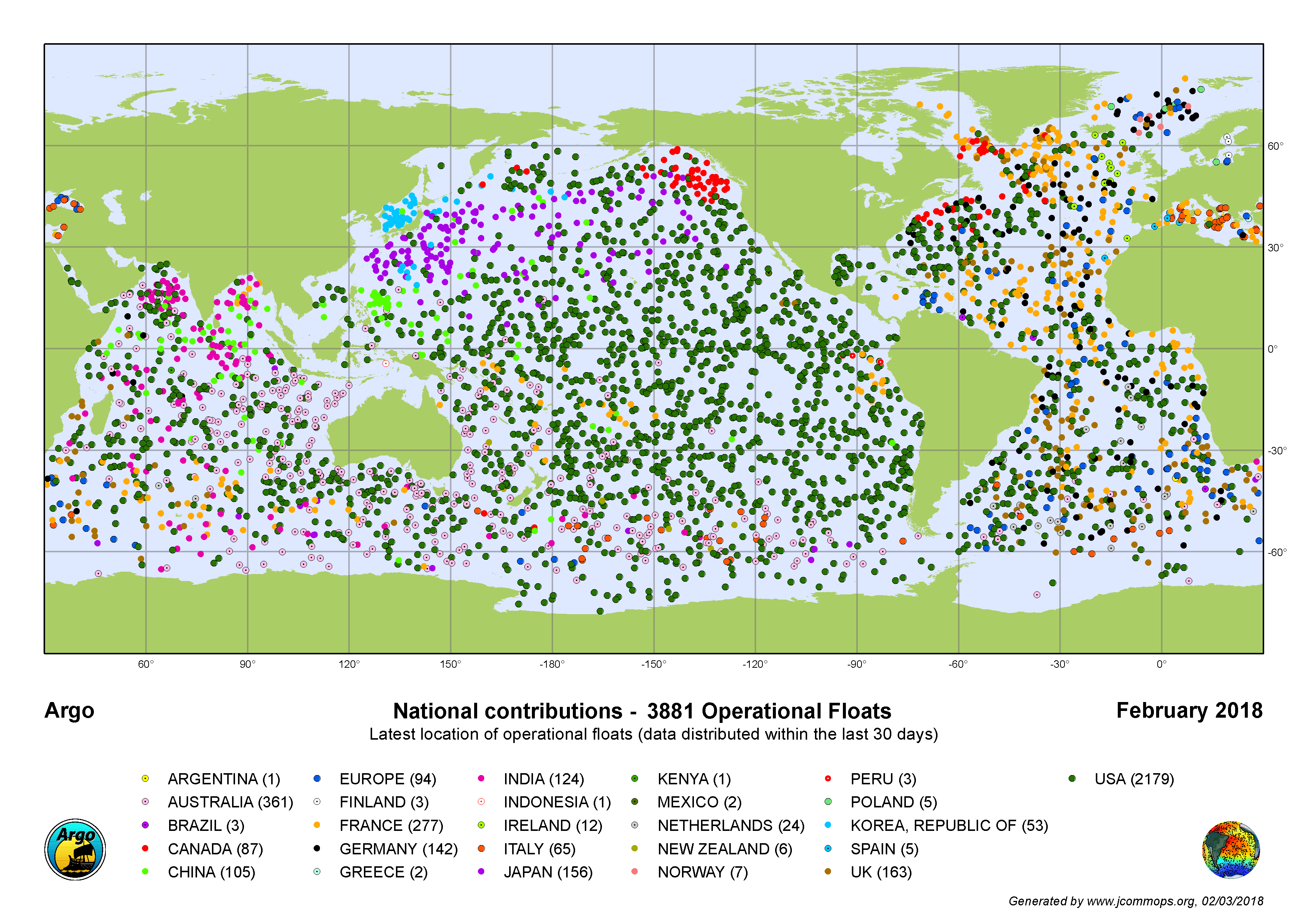
The global distribution of active floats in the Argo array

Ocean heat content is derived from ocean temperature measurements. Ocean temperature measurements come with difficulties, especially before the deployment of the Argo profiling floats. Due to poor spatial coverage and poor quality of data, it has not always been easy to distinguish between long term global warming trends and climate variability. Examples of these complicating factors are the variations caused by El Niño–Southern Oscillation or changes in ocean heat content caused by major volcanic eruptions.

Argo is an international program of robotic profiling floats deployed globally since the start of the 21st century. The program's initial 3000 units had expanded to nearly 4000 units by year 2020. At the start of each 10-day measurement cycle, a float descends to a depth of 1000 meters and drifts with the current there for nine days. It then descends to 2000 meters and measures temperature, salinity (conductivity), and depth (pressure) over a final day of ascent to the surface. At the surface the float transmits the depth profile and horizontal position data through satellite relays before repeating the cycle.

Starting 1992, the TOPEX/Poseidon and subsequent Jason satellite series altimeters have observed vertically integrated OHC, which is a major component of sea level rise. Since 2002, GRACE and GRACE-FO have remotely monitored ocean changes using gravimetry. The partnership between Argo and satellite measurements has yielded ongoing improvements to estimates of OHC and other global ocean properties.

== Causes for heat uptake ==
Oceanographer Josh Willis discusses the heat capacity of water, performs an experiment to demonstrate heat capacity using a water balloon and describes how water's ability to store heat affects Earth's climate.

Human-caused increases in greenhouse gases have reduced the outgoing infrared radiation from Earth's atmosphere creating an increase in planet-wide heat. Over 90% of this planetary heat uptake is manifest in ocean heat content. This high percentage is a result of the oceans high heat capacity. Most extra energy that enters the planet via the atmosphere is taken up and retained by the ocean.

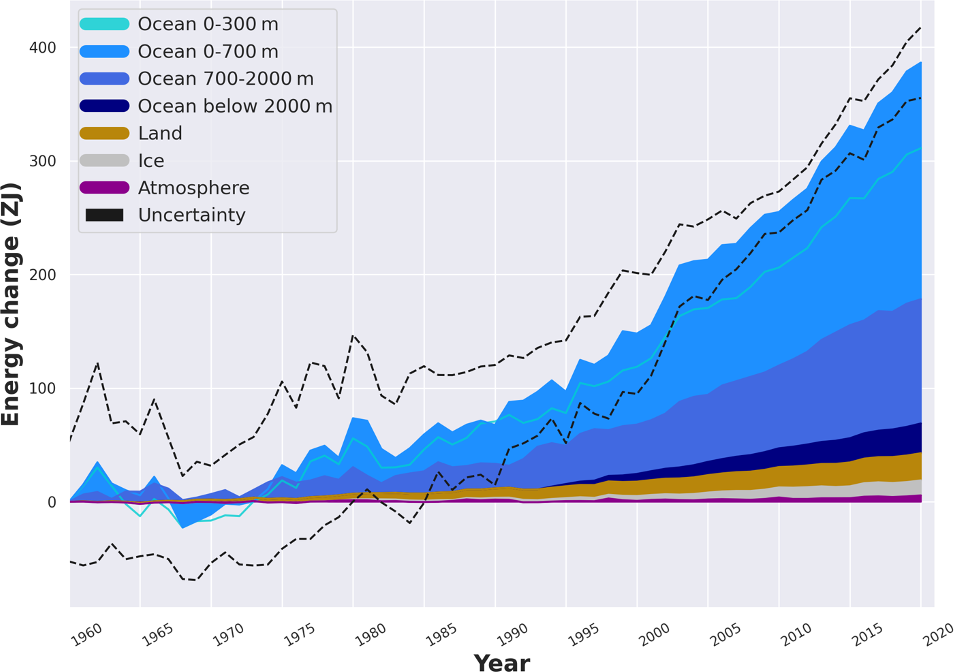
Earth heat inventory (energy accumulation) in ZJ for the components of the Earth's climate system relative to 1960 and from 1960 to 2018. The upper ocean (0–300 m, light blue line, and 0–700 m, light blue shading) accounts for the largest amount of heat gain.

Planetary heat uptake or heat content accounts for the entire energy added to or removed from the climate system. It can be computed as an accumulation over time of the observed differences (or imbalances) between total incoming and outgoing radiation. Changes to the imbalance have been estimated from Earth orbit by CERES and other remote instruments, and compared against in-situ surveys of heat inventory changes in oceans, land, ice and the atmosphere. Achieving complete and accurate results from either accounting method is challenging, but in different ways that are viewed by researchers as being mostly independent of each other. Increases in planetary heat content for the well-observed 2005–2019 period are thought to exceed measurement uncertainties.

From the ocean perspective, the more abundant equatorial solar irradiance is directly absorbed by Earth's tropical surface waters and drives the overall poleward propagation of heat. The surface also exchanges energy that has been absorbed by the lower troposphere through wind and wave action. Over time, a sustained imbalance in Earth's energy budget enables a net flow of heat either into or out of greater ocean depth via thermal conduction, downwelling, and upwelling. Releases of OHC to the atmosphere occur primarily via evaporation and enable the planetary water cycle. High sea surface temperatures help drive tropical cyclones, atmospheric rivers, atmospheric heat waves and other extreme weather events that can penetrate far inland. Altogether these processes enable the ocean to be Earth's largest thermal reservoir which functions to regulate the planet's climate; acting as both a sink and a source of energy.

Surface air temperatures over land masses have been increasing faster than the sea surface temperature, as most heat from global warming is absorbed by the oceans.

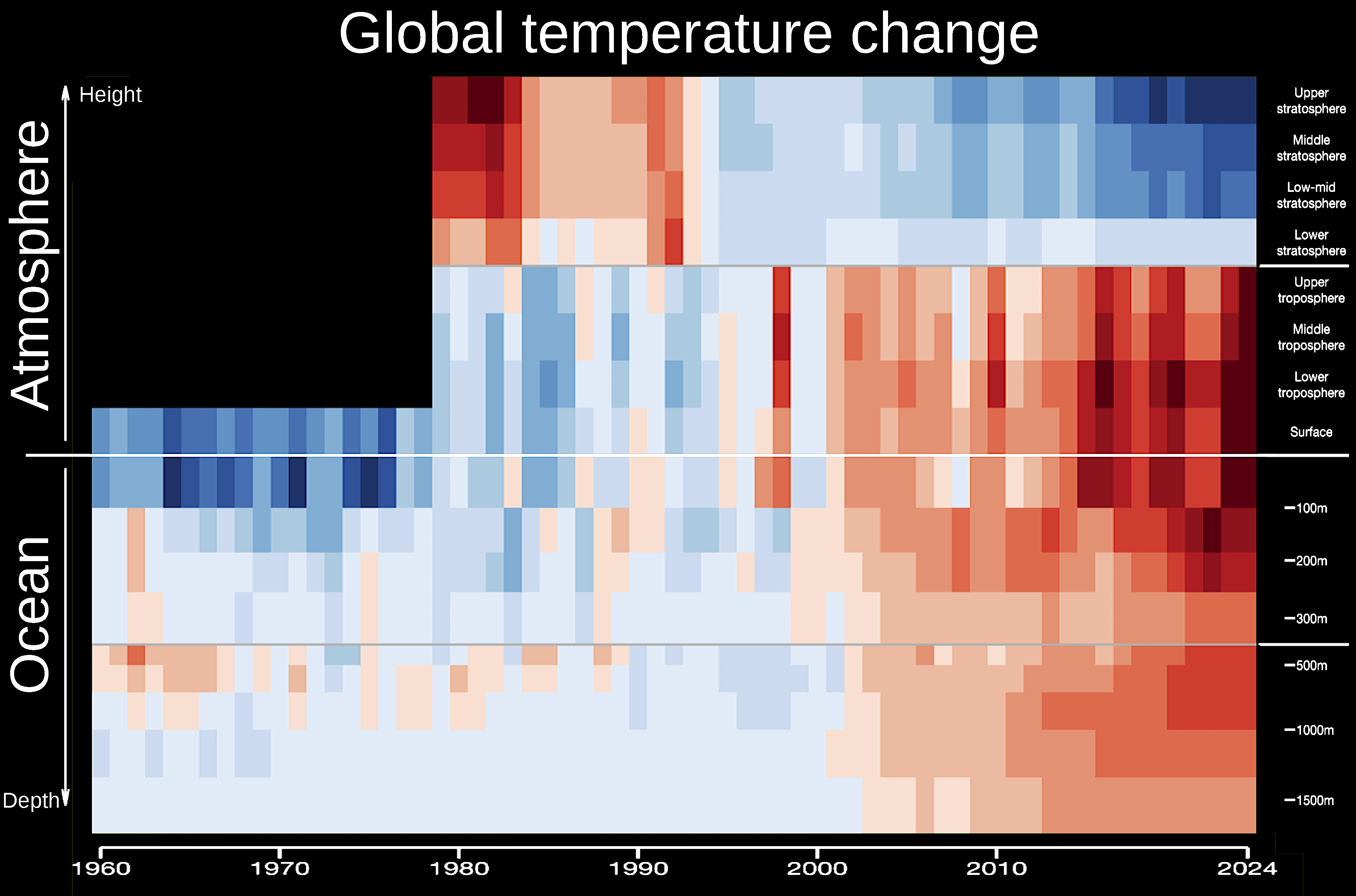
The greenhouse effect traps heat in the lower atmosphere and oceans, so that the upper atmosphere, receiving less reflected energy, cools.

From the perspective of land and ice covered regions, their portion of heat uptake is reduced and delayed by the dominant thermal inertia of the ocean. Although the average rise in land surface temperature has exceeded the ocean surface due to the lower inertia (smaller heat-transfer coefficient) of solid land and ice, temperatures would rise more rapidly and by a greater amount without the full ocean. Measurements of how rapidly the heat mixes into the deep ocean have also been underway to better close the ocean and planetary energy budgets.

== Recent observations and changes ==
Global upper-2000 m ocean heat content reached a new record in 2024, exceeding the 2023 value by 16 ± 8 ZJ, continuing a run of annual records over the past eight years. In 2025, global upper-2000 m ocean heat content rose by about 23 ± 8 ZJ relative to 2024, setting another record. Numerous independent studies in recent years have found a multi-decadal rise in OHC of upper ocean regions that has begun to penetrate to deeper regions. Numerous independent studies in recent years have found a multi-decadal rise in OHC of upper ocean regions that has begun to penetrate to deeper regions. The upper ocean (0–700 m) has warmed since 1971, while it is very likely that warming has occurred at intermediate depths (700–2000 m) and likely that deep ocean (below 2000 m) temperatures have increased. The heat uptake results from a persistent warming imbalance in Earth's energy budget that is most fundamentally caused by the anthropogenic increase in atmospheric greenhouse gases. There is very high confidence that increased ocean heat content in response to anthropogenic carbon dioxide emissions is essentially irreversible on human time scales.

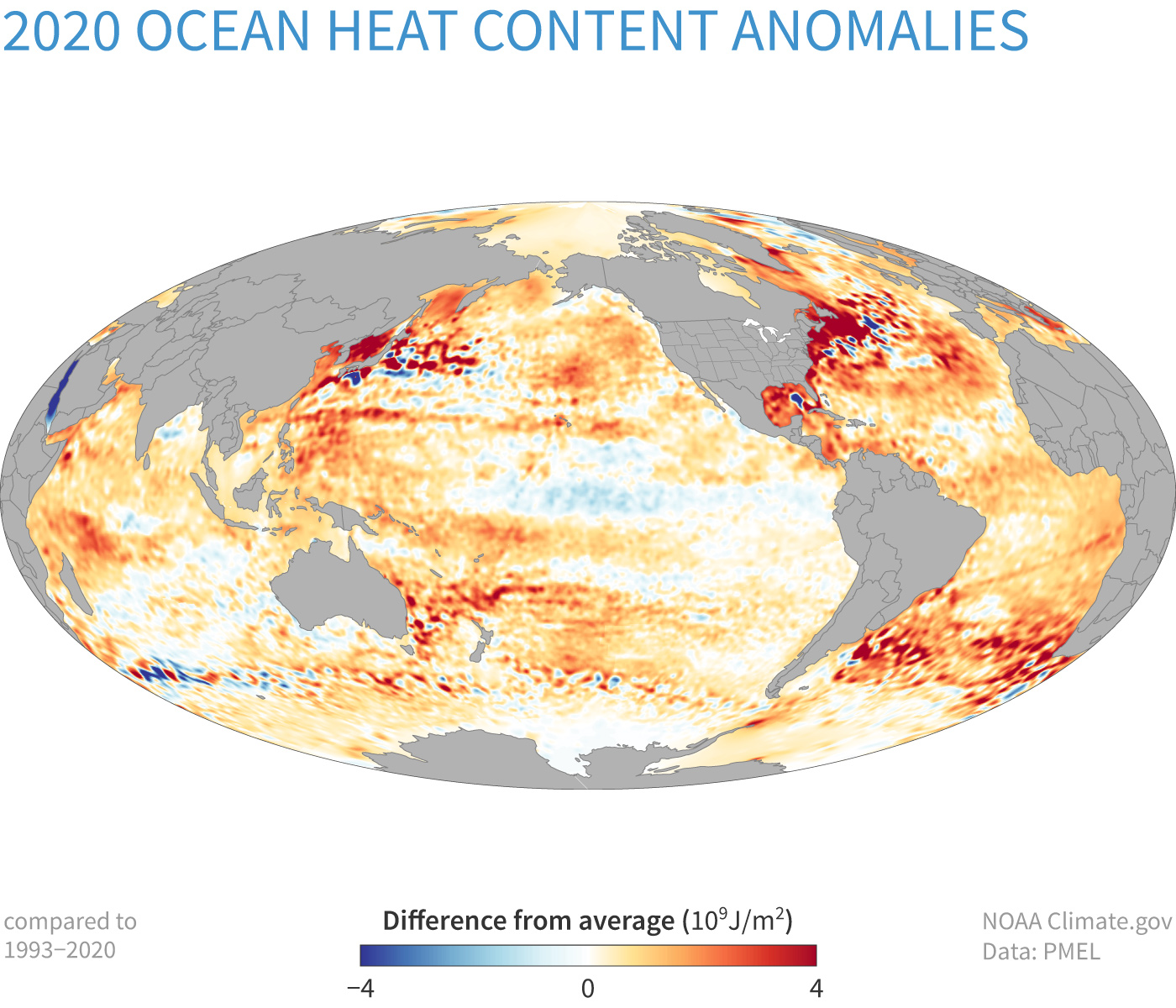
Map of the ocean heat anomaly in the upper 700 meters for year 2020 versus the 1993–2020 average. Some regions accumulated more energy than others due to transport drivers such as winds and currents.

Studies based on Argo measurements indicate that ocean surface winds, especially the subtropical trade winds in the Pacific Ocean, change ocean heat vertical distribution. This results in changes among ocean currents, and an increase of the subtropical overturning, which is also related to the El Niño and La Niña phenomenon. Depending on stochastic natural variability fluctuations, during La Niña years around 30% more heat from the upper ocean layer is transported into the deeper ocean. Furthermore, studies have shown that approximately one-third of the observed warming in the ocean is taking place in the 700–2000 meter ocean layer.

Model studies indicate that ocean currents transport more heat into deeper layers during La Niña years, following changes in wind circulation. Years with increased ocean heat uptake have been associated with negative phases of the interdecadal Pacific oscillation (IPO). This is of particular interest to climate scientists who use the data to estimate the ocean heat uptake.

The upper ocean heat content in most North Atlantic regions is dominated by heat transport convergence (a location where ocean currents meet), without large changes to temperature and salinity relation. Additionally, a study from 2022 on anthropogenic warming in the ocean indicates that 62% of the warming from the years between 1850 and 2018 in the North Atlantic along 25°N is kept in the water below 700 m, where a major percentage of the ocean's surplus heat is stored.

A study in 2015 concluded that ocean heat content increases by the Pacific Ocean were compensated by an abrupt distribution of OHC into the Indian Ocean.

A large-ensemble reanalysis of ocean warming published in 2024 estimated a 1961–2022 warming trend of 0.43 ± 0.08 W/m², along with a statistically significant acceleration rate of 0.15 ± 0.04 W/m² per decade which is consistent with similar independent analysis. The net rate of change in the top 2000 meters from 2003 to 2018 was +0.58±0.08 W/m^{2} (or annual mean energy gain of 9.3 zettajoules).

=== Southern Ocean Heat Uptake ===
As human-caused greenhouse gas emissions cause increased warming, one of the most notable effects of climate change on oceans is the increase in ocean heat content, which accounted for over 90% of the total global heating since 1971. Much of this increase has occurred in the extratropical Southern Hemisphere ocean south of 30°S. In West Antarctica, the temperature in the upper layer of the ocean has warmed 1 °C (1.8 °F) since 1955, and the Antarctic Circumpolar Current (ACC) is also warming faster than the global average. This warming directly affects the flow of warm and cold water masses which make up the overturning circulation, and it also reduces the cover of sea ice (which is highly reflective and so elevates the albedo of Earth's surface) in the Southern Hemisphere, as well as mass balance of Antarctica's ice shelves and peripheral glaciers. For these reasons, climate models consistently show that the year when global warming will reach 2 °C (3.6 °F) (inevitable in all climate change scenarios where greenhouse gas emissions have not been strongly lowered) depends on the status of the circulation more than any other factor besides the emissions themselves.

== Impacts ==
Warming oceans are one reason for coral bleaching and contribute to the migration of marine species. Marine heat waves are regions of life-threatening and persistently elevated water temperatures. Redistribution of the planet's internal energy by atmospheric circulation and ocean currents produces internal climate variability, often in the form of irregular oscillations, and helps to sustain the global thermohaline circulation.

The increase in OHC accounts for 30–40% of global sea-level rise from 1900 to 2020 because of thermal expansion. It is also an accelerator of sea ice, iceberg, and tidewater glacier melting. The ice loss reduces polar albedo, amplifying both the regional and global energy imbalances. The resulting ice retreat has been rapid and widespread for Arctic sea ice, and within northern fjords such as those of Greenland and Canada. Impacts to Antarctic sea ice and the vast Antarctic ice shelves which terminate into the Southern Ocean have varied by region and are also increasing due to warming waters. Breakup of the Thwaites Ice Shelf and its West Antarctica neighbors contributed about 10% of sea-level rise in 2020.

The ocean also functions as a sink and source of carbon, with a role comparable to that of land regions in Earth's carbon cycle. In accordance with the temperature dependence of Henry's law, warming surface waters are less able to absorb atmospheric gases including oxygen and the growing emissions of carbon dioxide and other greenhouse gases from human activity. Nevertheless the rate in which the ocean absorbs anthropogenic carbon dioxide has approximately tripled from the early 1960s to the late 2010s; a scaling proportional to the increase in atmospheric carbon dioxide. The increase in CO_{2} levels causes ocean acidification, which is where the pH of the ocean decreases due to the uptake of CO_{2}. This impacts the various species including reducing growth and calcification rates for calcifiers, lowering the capacity of acid base regulation in bivalves, and being harmful to the metabolic pathways of organisms which can lower the amount of energy these organisms are able to produce.

Warming of the deep ocean has the further potential to melt and release some of the vast store of frozen methane hydrate deposits that have naturally accumulated there. Over the next 100 years, if this warming continues, models suggest that about 0.03% of the global hydrate will melt, a small effect relative to human-caused methane emission.

== See also ==
- Ocean acidification – Decrease of pH levels in the ocean
- Ocean deoxygenation – Reduction of the oxygen content of the oceans
- Ocean stratification – Layering of ocean water due to density differences
- Special Report on the Ocean and Cryosphere in a Changing Climate – 2019 IPCC report
- Tropical cyclones and climate change – Impact of climate change on tropical cyclones
