= TEOS-10 =

International standard for the use and calculation of the thermodynamic properties

TEOS-10 (Thermodynamic Equation of Seawater - 2010) is the international standard for the use and calculation of the thermodynamic properties of seawater, humid air and ice. It supersedes the former standard EOS-80 (Equation of State of Seawater 1980). TEOS-10 is used by oceanographers and climate scientists to calculate and model properties of the oceans such as heat content in an internationally comparable way.

== History ==
TEOS-10 was developed by the SCOR(Scientific Committee on Oceanic Research)/IAPSO(International Association for the Physical Sciences of the Oceans) Working Group 127 which was chaired by Trevor McDougall. It has been approved as the official description of the thermodynamic properties of seawater, humid air and ice in 2009 by the Intergovernmental Oceanographic Commission (IOC) and in 2011 by the International Union of Geodesy and Geophysics (IUGG).

== Physical basis ==
TEOS-10 is based on thermodynamic potentials. Fluids like humid air and liquid water in TEOS-10 are therefore described by the Helmholtz energy F(m,T,V)=F(m,T,m/ρ) or the specific Helmholtz-energy f(T,ρ)=F(m,T,m/ρ)/m. The Helmholtz energy has a unique value across phase boundaries. For the calculation of the thermodynamic properties of seawater and ice, TEOS-10 uses the specific Gibbs potential g(T,P)=G/m, G=F+pV, because the pressure is a more easily measurable property than density in a geophysical context. Gibbs energies are multivalued around phase boundaries and need to be defined for each phase separately.

The thermodynamic potential functions are determined by a set of adjustable parameters which are tuned to fit experimental data and theoretical laws of physics like the ideal gas equation. Since absolute energy and entropy cannot be directly measured, arbitrary reference states for liquid water, seawater and dry air in TEOS-10 are defined in a way that

- internal energy and entropy of liquid water at the solid-liquid-gas triple point are zero,
- entropy and enthalpy of seawater are zero at S_{A} (Absolute Salinity) = 35.16504 g/kg, T (Temperature) = 273.15 K, p (pressure) = 101325 Pa,
- entropy and enthalpy of dry air are zero at T (Temperature) = 273.15 K, p (pressure) = 101325 Pa.

== Included thermodynamic properties ==
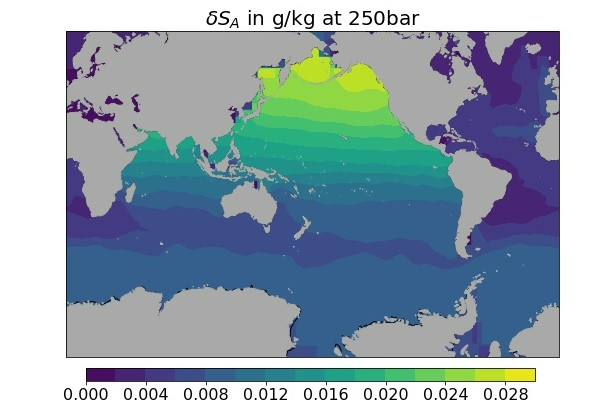
Distribution of the Absolute Salinity Anomaly at 2500dbar (approx 2500m depth), created with the GSW Oceanographic Toolbox of TEOS-10

TEOS-10 covers all thermodynamic properties of liquid water, seawater, ice, water vapour and humid air within their particular ranges of validity as well as their mutual equilibrium composites such as sea ice or cloudy (wet and icy) air.

Additionally, TEOS-10 covers derived properties, for example the potential temperature and Conservative Temperature, the buoyancy frequency, the planetary vorticity and the Montgomery and Cunningham geostrophic streamfunctions. A complete list of featured properties can be found in the TEOS-10 Manual.

The handling of salinity was one of the novelties in TEOS-10. It defines the relationship between Reference Salinity and Practical Salinity, Chlorinity or Absolute Salinity and accounts for the different chemical compositions by adding a regionally variable 𝛿SA (see Figure). TEOS-10 is valid for Vienna Standard Mean Ocean Water which accounts for different hydrogen- and oxygen-isotope compositions in water which affects the triple point and therefore phase transitions of water.

== Software packages ==
TEOS-10 includes the Gibbs Seawater (GSW) Oceanographic Toolbox which is available as open source software in MATLAB, Fortran, Python, C, C++, R, Julia and PHP. While TEOS-10 is generally expressed in basic SI-units, the GSW package uses input and output data in commonly used oceanographic units (such as g/kg for Absolute Salinity S_{A} and dbar for pressure p).

In addition to the GSW Oceanographic Toolbox, the Seawater-Ice-Air (SIA) Library is available for Fortran and VBA (for the use in Excel), and covers the thermodynamic properties of seawater, ice and (moist) air. In contrast to the GSW Toolbox, the SIA-Library exclusively uses basic SI-units.

== Differences between TEOS-10 and EOS-80 ==
EOS-80 (Equation of State of Seawater -1980) uses Practical Salinity measured on the PSS-78 (Practical Salinity Scale of 1978) scale that itself is based on measurements of temperature, pressure and electrical conductivity. Thus, EOS-80 did not account for different chemical compositions of seawater.

EOS-80 consisted of separate equations for density, sound speed, freezing temperature and heat capacity but did not provide expressions for entropy or chemical potentials. Therefore, it was not a complete and consistent description of the thermodynamic properties of seawater. Inconsistencies in EOS-80 appear for example in the heat content at high pressure, depending on which equation is used for the calculation. Furthermore, EOS-80 was not consistent with meteorological equations while TEOS-10 is valid for humid air as well as for seawater.

EOS-80 provided expressions for potential temperature, which removes the effect of pressure on temperature but not for Conservative Temperature, which is a direct measure for potential enthalpy and therefore heat content.

In TEOS-10 the current standard for temperature scales, ITS-90 (International Temperature Scale of 1990) is used, while EOS-80 used the IPTS-68 (International Practical Temperature of 1968). In the SIA-Library of TEOS-10 implementations to convert outdated into current scales are included.

TEOS-10 was derived using absolute pressure P while EOS-80 used the pressure relative to the sea surface 𝑝_{sea}. They can be converted by: P/Pa = 101325 + 10000 ∙ 𝑝_{sea}/dbar (see Atmospheric Pressure).
