= James T. Moore (meteorologist) =

American meteorologist

Jim Moore
- Born: February 9, 1952; New York City, New York, USA
- Died: July 25, 2006 (aged 54); St. Louis, Missouri, USA
- Education: New York University (B.S., 1974); Cornell University (M.S., 1976; Ph.D., 1979)
- Known for: Isentropic analysis and precipitation forecasting
- Awards: NWA Lifetime Achievement Award
- Scientific career
- Fields: Atmospheric sciences
- Workplaces: Saint Louis University
- Thesis: A Utilization of the Nested Grid Approach in the Development of a Severe Weather Index (1979)
- Doctoral advisor: Douglas A. Paine
- Doctoral students: Richard C. Molinaro (1988), Glenn E. VanKnowe (1996), Scott M. Rochette (1998), Patrick S. Market (1999), Sam Ng (2005), Martin A. Baxter (2006)

James Thomas Moore (February 9, 1952 – July 25, 2006) was an American meteorologist who advanced isentropic analysis, jet stream dynamics, cyclogenesis, and heavy precipitation forecasting. He was a past president of the National Weather Association. "Doc Moore" was also the co-author, with fellow meteorologist Peter R. Chaston, of Jokes and Puns for Groan-Ups.

Growing up in New York City, Jim had an early interest in weather. He attended New York University, graduating with a B.S. in meteorology, magna cum laude, in 1974. He moved on to Cornell University, where he earned a M.S. in 1976 with the thesis A Dynamic Visualization of the Events in the Multiscale Energy-momentum Cascade Leading to the Development of Severe Storms, continuing to a Ph.D. in 1979 with the dissertation A Utilization of the Nested Grid Approach in the Development of a Severe Weather Index, both in atmospheric sciences. He took an assistant professor position at State University College at Oneonta (SUCO), New York, from 1978 to 1980. After this he was a longtime professor at Saint Louis University, where he remained a staple from 1980 until his death in 2006. A noted synoptician, most of his doctoral students are current or former professors of synoptic meteorology.

Moore was strongly interested in teaching, both forecasters and university students, as well as the general public. He regarded furthering his students (and forecasters) as the most important thing he could be doing --as even more important than his research. As such, he was heavily involved in bridging research and operational meteorology and he traveled the country giving presentations, interacting with forecasters and ingesting feedback. He served as president of National Weather Association (NWA) in 1999, and in 2000, received the T. Theodore Fujita Research Achievement Award from the NWA. In 2003, he was elected a Fellow of the American Meteorological Society (AMS). Then in 2006 he received the inaugural COMET Lifetime Achievement Award, and posthumously, the NWA Lifetime Achievement Award.
