= Migration of marine species in the Northern Atlantic Ocean =

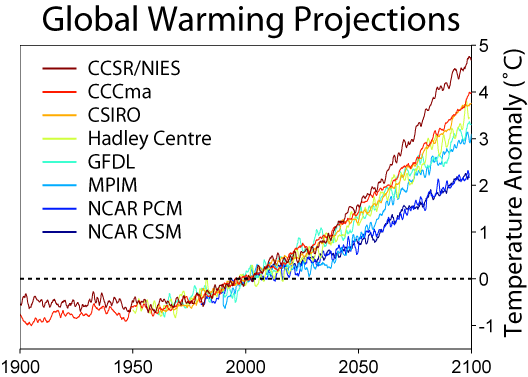
Calculations prepared in or before 2001 from a range of climate models under the SRES A2 emissions scenario, which assumes no action is taken to reduce emissions and regionally divided economic development.

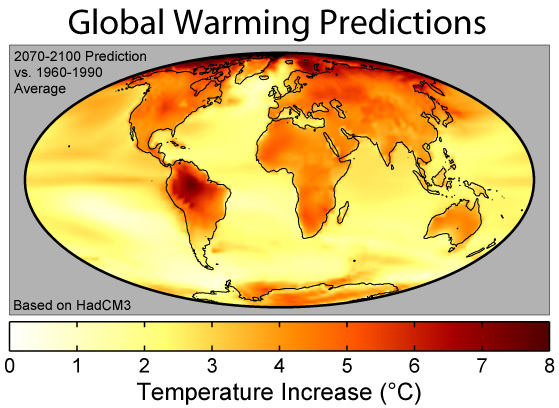
The geographic distribution of surface warming during the 21st century calculated by the HadCM3 climate model if a business as usual scenario is assumed for economic growth and greenhouse gas emissions. In this figure, the globally averaged warming corresponds to 3.0 °C (37.4 °F).

Due to the warming of the Atlantic Ocean caused by climate change, many species of fish are beginning to shift north towards cooler waters within their temperature range. Tropical species are being found outside their normal range and into more northern waters causing an array of ecological, economic, and fishery management problems.

== Research ==
William Cheung, a professor at the University of East Anglia, in the Sea Around Us Project at the University of British Columbia concluded that the oceans were warming at an average of 0.19 °C (32.34 °F) per decade and at 0.23 °C (32.41 °F) per decade in tropical waters. However, the north-east Atlantic has been warming at a rate of 0.49 °C (32.88 °F) per decade. Cheung and his colleagues were able to get these estimates by using the mean temperature of catch. They used data from 990 species within 52 marine ecosystems from 1970-2006. Using fisheries data and computer models, Cheung was able to estimate the shift of species. Species are migrating north at an average rate of 40 to 45 kilometers (25 to 28 mi) per decade. The study predicted that there will be a 60% shift of species towards northern waters within the next 41 years.

== Species shifting north ==
- Atlantic surf clams that were once common off the coasts of Delaware, Virginia, and Maryland are now rare, but are now more common in deeper waters off the coast of New England.
- Red Mullet that were common in the Mediterranean are now found in the North Sea off the Coast of Great Britain and Norway.
- Species of Triggerfish and Grouper from the Gulf of Mexico are now being caught in Mid-Atlantic waters.
- Lionfish native to the western Pacific are invasive species in the Gulf of Mexico but are now being found off the coast of North Carolina.

== Potential issues ==
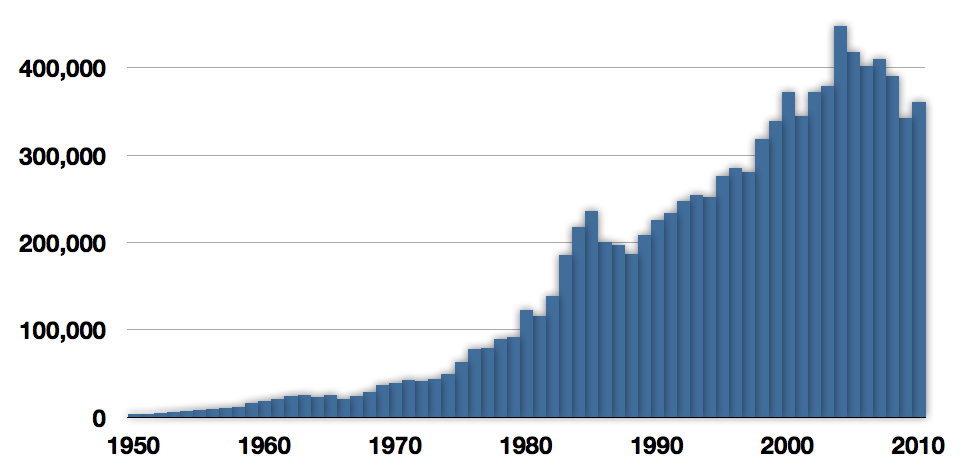
Global capture of Pandalus borealis in tonnes reported by the FAO, 1950–2010

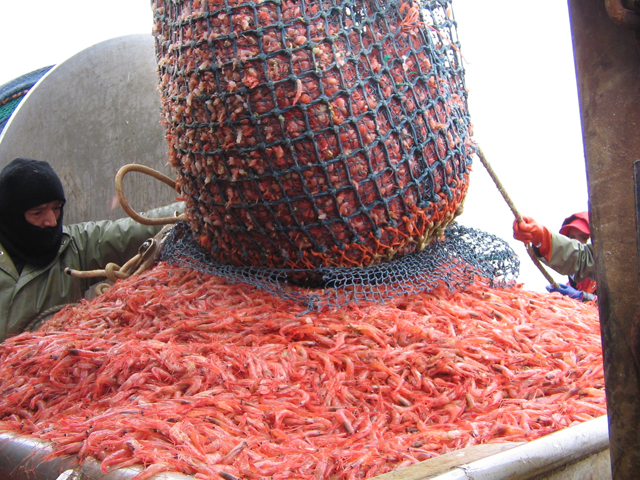
Hauled aboard a shrimp boat

- The Northern Shrimp population may decline in the future. The shrimp larvae hatching period is dependent upon certain temperatures. Once the larvae hatch, they feed on an annual algal bloom. There is a strong correlation between the larvae hatching and when the algal bloom occurs. The changing ocean temperature may result in a mismatch in time with the larvae and algal bloom which could cause a decline in the Northern shrimp population.
- The Red mullet migration into the northern Atlantic could catalyze the decline of cod. Red mullet could outcompete Cod, eventually replacing the species. Emily Pidgeon, the senior director of strategic marine initiatives at Conservation International, stated that the worldwide cod population could decrease by almost half by 2050.
