= Heat content (fuel) =

Industrial term for heat energy available from a unit of fuel

In the U.S. energy industry, heat content is the amount of heat energy that will be released by combustion of a unit quantity of a fuel or by transformation of another energy form. For example, fossil fuels are rated by heat content, with a distinction made between gross heat content (which includes heat energy used to vaporize moisture in the fuel) and net heat content (which excludes heat energy used to vaporize moisture in the fuel.) The term is also sometimes applied to other energy forms, such as heat content of a kilowatt-hour of electricity or a pound of steam.
