= Isentropic analysis =

Meteorological technique for determining air motion above the planetary boundary layer

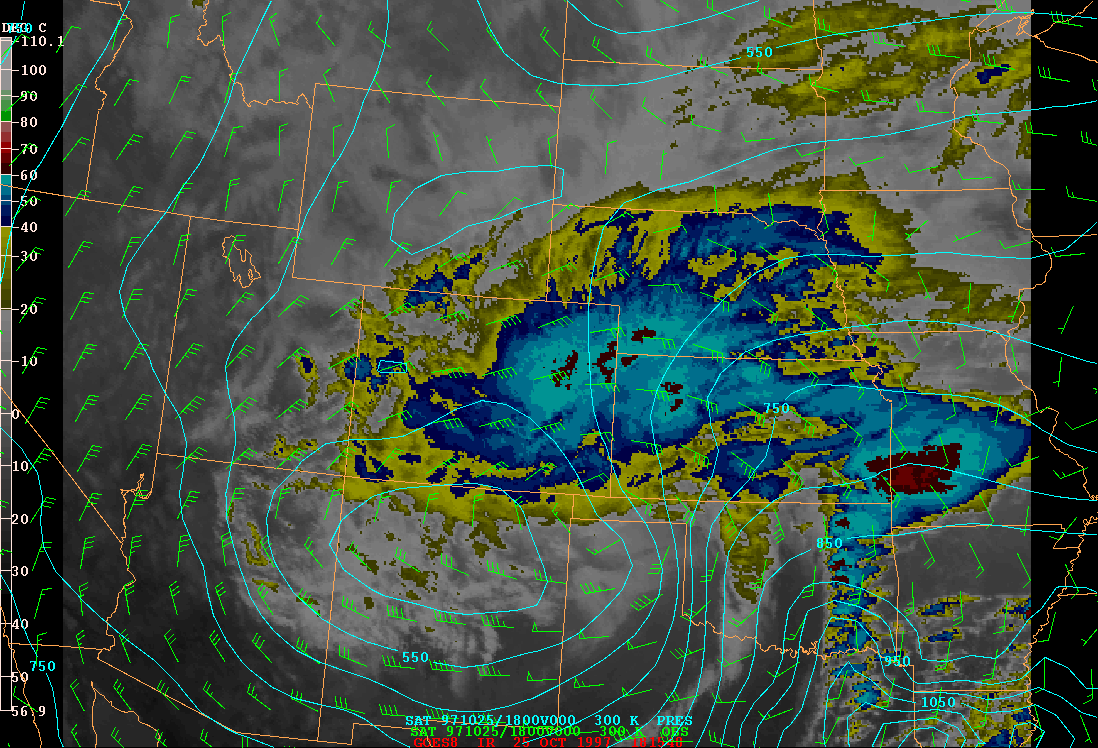
Isentropic analysis of the 300 kelvin isotrope and the weather satellite image of clouds during a blizzard in Colorado

In meteorology, isentropic analysis is a technique used to find the vertical and horizontal motion of airmasses during an adiabatic (i.e. non-heat-exchanging) process above the planetary boundary layer. The change of state of air parcels following isentropic surfaces does not involve exchange of heat with the environment. Such an analysis can also evaluate the airmass stability in the vertical dimension and whether an air parcel crossing such a surface will result in convective or stratiform clouds. It is based on the study of weather maps or vertical cross-sections of the potential temperature values in the troposphere.

On a synoptic scale, isentropic analysis is associated with weather fronts: warm fronts are found where the wind crosses lines of a chosen potential temperature from lower heights to higher ones, while cold fronts are where the wind crosses descending heights. Synoptic clouds and precipitations can thus be better found with these areas of advection than with conventional isobaric maps. From a mesoscale point of view, an air parcel moving vertically will cross isolines of potential temperature and it will be unstable if the value of those lines decrease with altitude, or stable if they increase.
