= Earth system governance =

Field of scholarly inquiry in the social sciences

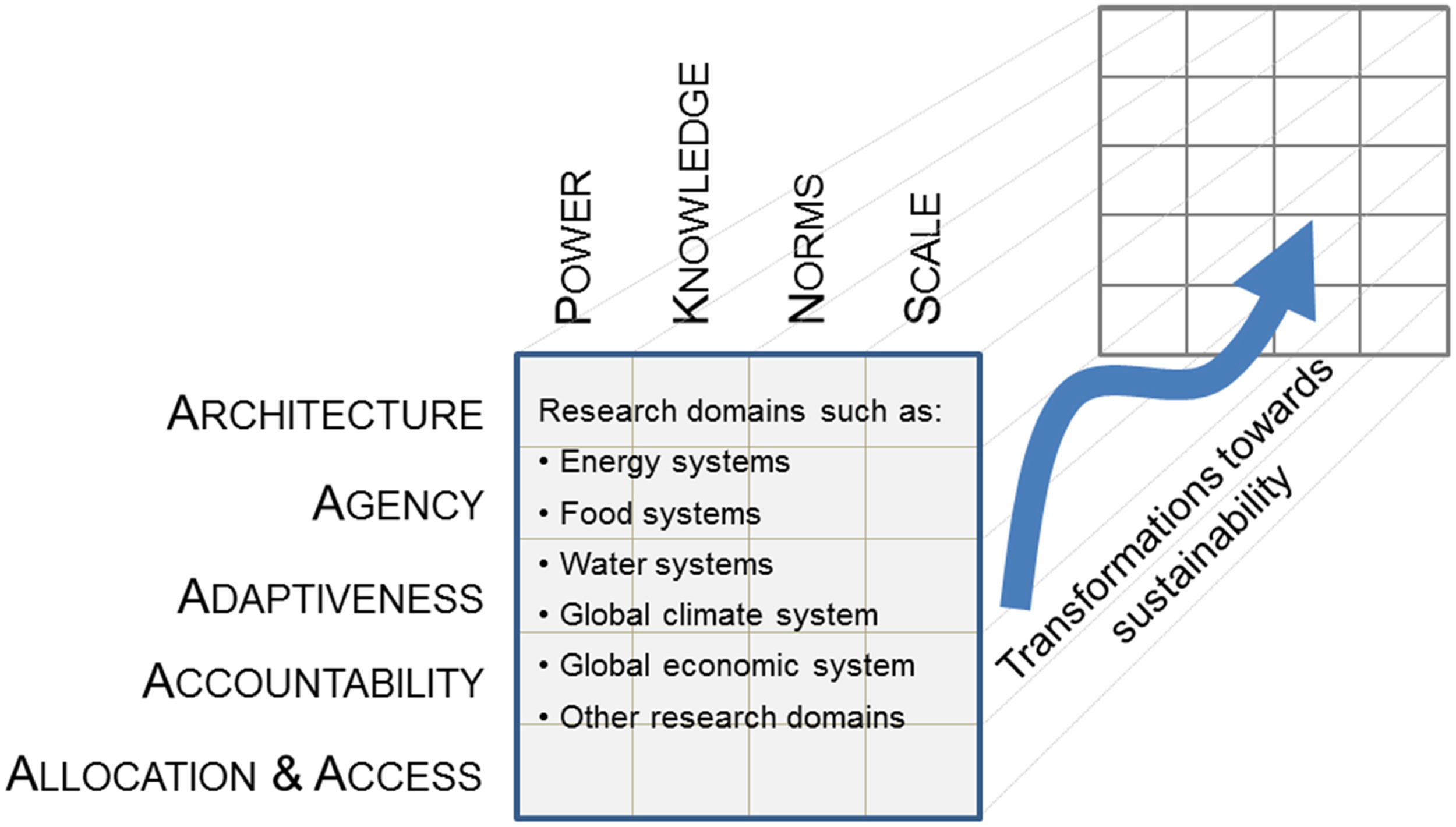
Applying the existing earth system governance (ESG) framework to the challenge of understanding and analysing transformations towards sustainability

Earth system governance (or earth systems governance) is a broad area of scholarly inquiry that builds on earlier notions of environmental policy and nature conservation, but puts these into the broader context of human-induced transformations of the entire earth system. The integrative paradigm of earth system governance (ESG) has evolved into an active research area that brings together a variety of disciplines including political science, sociology, economics, ecology, policy studies, geography, sustainability science, and law.

ESG research can be carried out under a conceptual framework of five analytical problems which are all highly interlinked. These analytical problems are "problems of the overall architecture of ESG, of agency beyond the state and of the state, of the adaptiveness of governance mechanisms and processes, of their accountability and legitimacy and of modes of allocation and access in ESG". They share at least four cross-cutting themes which are "power, knowledge, norms and scale".

ESG is not simply about the global level but all levels are relevant. Therefore, researchers study sustainability challenges at local, national and global levels. The ESG research community focuses on the study of formal rules and institutions, which include laws, public regulations and policies set by national or local governments and international organizations to address global and local sustainability problems. The network also examines informal rules and practices, such as unwritten norms and societal behaviors. Additionally, the community explores actor networks, such as relationships and interactions among various stakeholders such as governments, NGOs, and civil society.

Example applications of ESG include topics around planetary justice, climate governance, ocean governance. For example, in the context of ocean governance, research in ESG helps to address governance-related needs of the UN Decade of Ocean Science for Sustainable Development. There are fundamental research questions regarding ocean science for sustainable development, namely "who gets what?" (justice and allocation), "who gets to decide?" (democracy and power), "how are current systems maintained?" (architecture and agency), and "how do these systems change?" (in the present: agency, adaptiveness and reflexivity; and in the future: anticipation and imagination). Another example are international treaties: Social science research on ESG can offer insights on the factors that have promoted successful negotiation, design, and implementation of international environmental agreements such as the High Seas Treaty.

Hundreds of scholars who are interested in ESG research have joined forces within the Earth System Governance Project, a large research network and interdisciplinary social science research alliance which began in 2009.

== Definition ==
The concept of earth system governance (ESG) is defined in the 2009 Science and Implementation Plan of the Earth System Governance Project as: "the interrelated and increasingly integrated system of formal and informal rules, rule-making systems, and actor-networks at all levels of human society (from local to global) that are set up to steer societies towards preventing, mitigating, and adapting to global and local environmental change and, in particular, earth system transformation, within the normative context of sustainable development."

A simpler version of the same definition is: Earth system governance is the combination of various rules and efforts from actors at all levels of society, from local to global, aimed at guiding actions to prevent, reduce, and adapt to environmental changes.

ESG is about the "societal steering of human activities regarding the long-term stability of geobiophysical systems" and "global stewardship for the planet based on non-hierarchical processes of cooperation and coordination at multiple levels".

ESG is a subfield of earth system sciences analyzed from a social sciences perspective. Earth system science assumes a holistic view of the dynamic interaction between the Earth's spheres and their many constituent subsystems fluxes and processes, the resulting spatial organization and time evolution of these systems, and their variability, stability and instability.

The concept of ESG also has its conceptual boundaries: "Questions of international security, global communication, trade regulation, terrorism, or human rights, for instance, are less studied within the earth system governance research community."

== Development ==
The new paradigm of earth system governance was originally developed in the Netherlands by Professor Frank Biermann in his inaugural lecture at the VU University Amsterdam, which was published later in 2007. Based on this pioneering contribution, Biermann was invited by the International Human Dimensions Programme on Global Environmental Change to develop a long-term comprehensive international program in this field, which became in 2009 the global Earth System Governance Project (ESG Project). The ESG Project is a network of researchers. It produced the first science and implementation plan for ESG research in 2009. This provided a framework for research activities of ESG scholars during 2009 to 2018. It was followed by a second Science and Implementation Plan in 2018 which is meant to guide the research activities from 2018 onwards.

== Conceptual framework of analytical problems ==
ESG research can be carried out under a conceptual framework of five analytical problems which are all highly interlinked. These analytical problems are "problems of the overall architecture of ESG, of agency beyond the state and of the state, of the adaptiveness of governance mechanisms and processes, of their accountability and legitimacy and of modes of allocation and access in ESG". The table below shows these five research activities and the main research questions for each of the analytical problems.

At the center of the ESG framework are particular problem domains (i.e. energy, food, water, climate, and economic systems), which are likely to be the focus of efforts to bring about transformations towards sustainability.

Conceptual framework of five analytical problems for research in ESG (all starting with the letter A)
Analytical problem	Activities of researchers	Examples for main research questions
Architecture of governance	To analyze the emergence, design and effectiveness of governance systems as well as the overall integration of global, regional, national and local governance.	How do environmental institutions perform within larger governance structures? What environmental impacts arise from non-environmental governance systems? What are the norms of ESG?
Agents of governance	To investigate the diverse agents beyond national governments, such as businesses, non-profit organizations, or cities, studying their roles, responsibilities, authority, and impact.	Who are the agents of ESG? How do they exercise their roles, and how can their relevance be evaluated?
Adaptiveness	To analyze how long-term stability can best be balanced with flexibility to respond to new developments. This research explores the politics and processes that enhance adaptiveness in governance.	What attributes of governance systems promote adaptiveness? How does adaptiveness influence governance?
Accountability and legitimacy	To focus on questions of accountability, legitimacy, transparency, and the democratic quality of governance.	What are the sources of accountability, legitimacy and democratic governance? How do they affect governance performance? What designs can best balance interests and perspectives?
Allocation and Access	To study the distribution of resources, raising issues of planetary justice.	How can interdisciplinary definitions of allocation and access be developed? What principles underlie planetary justice, and how does planetary justice align with governance effectiveness?

The first Science and Implementation Plan from 2009 emphasized four cross-cutting themes that were deemed crucial for understanding these problems: power, knowledge, norms, and scale. It also promoted focused case studies on the global water, food, climate, and economic systems, integrating here analyses of governance architecture, agents, adaptiveness, accountability, and allocation.

The second Science and Implementation Plan from 2018 has expanded the original framework of the "5 A's" to pair them with novel concepts that have become more prominent in the community. This resulted in the following five sets of research lenses:

1. Architecture and agency
2. Democracy and power
3. Justice and allocation
4. Anticipation and imagination
5. Adaptiveness and reflexivity

Those research lenses are embedded in four contextual conditions: Transformations, inequality, anthropocene, and diversity.

The ESG research community focuses on the study of formal rules and institutions, which include laws, public regulations and policies set by national or local governments and international organizations to address global and local sustainability problems. The network also examines informal rules and practices, such as unwritten norms and societal behaviors. Additionally, the community explores actor networks, such as relationships and interactions among various stakeholders such as governments, NGOs, and civil society.

When scholars conduct research in ESG they theorize about it as analytical practice (explaining current politics), as normative critique (a critique of current systems of governance), and as transformative visioning.

== Analytical problems ==
=== Architectures ===
Architectures of ESG has been defined as "the overarching system of public and private institutions, principles, norms, regulations, decision-making procedures and organizations that are valid or active in a given area of global governance". It is the "macro-level of governance", or a "bird's-eye view on the global governance landscape". Building blocks of architectures of global governance include intergovernmental institutions, international bureaucracies, and non-state, transnational institutions and networks.

The structural features of global governance architectures can be investigated at micro, meso and macro levels. The micro level includes "dyadic interlinkages between institutions". The meso level includes "regime complexes of loosely coupled institutions". Finally, the macro level is about whole architectures.

There are also many areas of voids in the governance architecture, i.e. instances of non-governance. For example, there is no global treaty on deforestation, no comprehensive laws or treaties in relationship to the atmosphere, the Arctic region, and ocean acidification.

ESG is not simply about the global level but all levels are relevant. Therefore, researchers study sustainability challenges at local, national and global levels. They look into how local communities manage natural resources and respond to sustainability changes. At the national level, ESG researchers examine how governments and other actors develop and implement policies to address sustainability challenges. They also investigate international agreements, the role of global organizations such as the United Nations and transnational institutions in governing earth systems. By integrating research across all these scales, ESG researchers seek to understand the complexities of sustainability governance and develop actionable solutions that are effective and fair at all levels of society.

=== Agency ===
When ESG researchers investigate agency they ask: "who are the agents of ESG, how do they become authoritative, and to what effect?" Or in other words "who governs for whom and how and to what effect?". Researchers on agency in ESG thus investigate the "multiple ways in which actors acquire authority to affect the outcomes of ESG".

The Earth System Governance Project's Science Plan explains the difference between actors and agents in ESG. Agents are more empowered than actors: "Agents are authoritative actors, where authority is understood as the ability to exercise power with legitimacy". For this reason, agency is about "a particular relationship between actors and those whom they seek to govern". Categories of agents include states (or countries), businesses and civil society but these categories overlap and are not uniform.

=== Adaptiveness ===
The understanding of adaptiveness in the ESG context is for it to be "an umbrella term for a set of related concepts – vulnerability, resilience, adaptation, robustness, adaptive capacity, social learning and so on – to describe changes made by social groups in response to, or in anticipation of, challenges created through environmental change". Subsequently, ESG researchers have been investigating questions such as "what are the politics of adaptiveness? Which governance processes foster adaptiveness? What attributes of governance systems enhance capacities to adapt? How, when, and why does adaptiveness influence earth system governance?".

=== Justice and allocation ===
==== Planetary justice ====
Planetary justice encompasses traditional concerns of environmental justice but foregrounds that the entire human and non-human world is now at stake, not merely a locality. It is concerned with justice among humans as well as between humans and the natural world. As early as 1972 scholars had called for planetary justice, and more recently (in 2006), the term has been used to refer to global justice from a non-Western philosophical perspective. Scholars are now placing the justice discourse in the broader debate on planetary stewardship, earth system transformation and ESG.

Planetary justice is a system designed to secure the integrity of the planetary system as well as universal protection of basic human dignity for all people. It requires addressing extreme concentrations of wealth in industrialized and middle-income countries and international redistributions of wealth. There are allocation challenges, both within and between countries. To address these challenges it is critical to realize pro-poor planetary justice.

Planetary justice cannot be a debate among academics and activists in the global North alone. For the ideals of planetary justice to be achieved, these challenges must be linked to the lives and life worlds of the poorest and most marginalized people of the world.

===== Approaches for ESG and planetary stewardship =====
There are five dominant approaches to ESG when viewed together with planetary stewardship: market liberal, bioenvironmentalist, ecomodernist, institutionalist, and social green. All of these approaches to planetary stewardship and ESG are not yet apt at realizing a pro-poor vision of justice. They cannot handle the complex causes of planetary crisis, including socioeconomic inequality and social injustice:

- A market liberal approach builds on neoclassical economics and the assumption of individual rational behavior to argue that economic growth and higher incomes are essential for effective planetary stewardship.
- A bioenvironmentalist approach focuses on the constraints of biological limits, or the carrying capacity of the planet. Accordingly, bio-environmentalists see population pressure and overconsumption of natural resources as major causes of environmental degradation.
- An ecomodernist approach emphasizes the need to tap into the "power of human ingenuity and creativity" for managing planetary problems such as climate change. Justice—at international and local levels—is not a core consideration for ecomodernists.
- An institutionalist approach seeks to foster interstate cooperation in pursuit of planetary stewardship. Many institutionalist research programs remain focused on the goal of effective protection of the global environment—and not on increasing justice at the same time.
- A social green approach sees planetary degradation as inseparable from questions of social, economic, and political inequalities.

Scholars have argued that planetary justice requires prioritizing poor people's interests within planetary stewardship.

== Contextual conditions ==
ESG research takes place in four contextual conditions: Transformations, inequality, anthropocene, and diversity.

=== Transformations ===
Transformations have been defined as "shifts that involve fundamental changes in structural, functional, relational and cognitive dimensions of linked socio-technical-ecological systems". Examples include climate change, economic globalization, and digitization. Very often, "transformations imply changes in power relations (e.g. challenging, disrupting or entrenching), and thus are deeply contested, political phenomena". A variety of conceptual approaches have been developed to understand and analyse societal transition or transformation processes, including: socio-technical transitions, social-ecological systems, sustainability pathways, and transformative adaptation.

The ESG framework can be used as a lens for understanding and analysing transformations. It is a high-level framework for thinking about governance, and does not give specific guidance on processes of transformation, but is flexible enough to accommodate different conceptual approaches that might be applied by different scholars.

By using this framework, ESG researchers can explore the governance and politics of transformations towards sustainability by applying a conceptual lens that takes a political perspective of governance for sustainability.

=== Anthropocene ===
Anthropocene is a term that has been used to refer to the period of time during which humanity has become a planetary force of change. It appears in scientific social discourse, especially with respect to accelerating geophysical and biochemical changes that characterize the 20th and 21st centuries on Earth. Originally a proposal for a new geological epoch following the Holocene, it was rejected as such in 2024 by the International Commission on Stratigraphy (ICS) and the International Union of Geological Sciences (IUGS).

== Researchers and networks ==
Many scholars have applied the ESG framework in their research. Examples include the following scholars who are also co-founders of the ESG Project: Frank Biermann, Michele Betsill, John Dryzek, Norichika Kanie and Lennart Olsson. In addition, ESG scholars who have co-authored the ESG Project's first science and implementation plan in 2009 include for example: Joyeeta Gupta, Louis Lebel, Diana Liverman, Heike Schroeder, and Bernd Siebenhüner.

Other notable scholars in ESG are for example Peter M. Haas, Chris Gordon, Aarti Gupta, Louis J. Kotzé, James Meadowcroft, Chukwumerije Okereke, Asa Persson, Oran R. Young, Fariborz Zelli. 557 scholars are formally registered as members of the ESG Project (as of 2024).

=== Earth System Governance Project ===
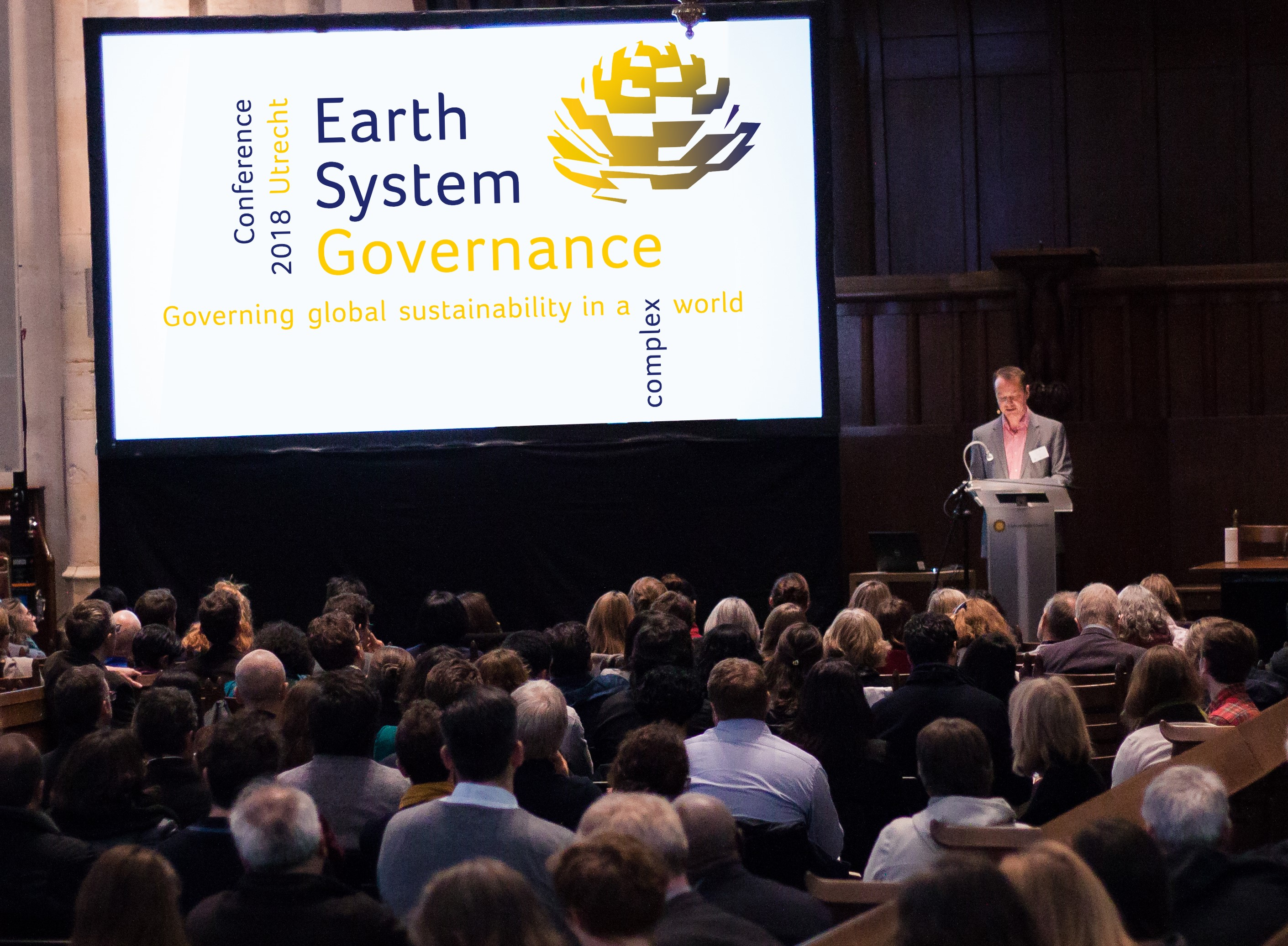
Frank Biermann opening the 2018 Utrecht Conference on Earth System Governance

The Earth System Governance Project (ESG Project) is a global research network that "aims to advance knowledge at the interface between global environmental change and governance. The network connects and mobilizes scholars from the social sciences and humanities researching at local and global scales".

The ESG Project has its origins in an international program called the International Human Dimensions Programme on Global Environmental Change. In its current form, the ESG Project began in January 2009. Over time, it has evolved into a broader research alliance that builds on an international network of research centers, lead faculty, senior research fellows and research fellows. It is now the largest social science research network in the area of governance and global environmental change.

The Climate Change Leadership Unit at Uppsala University in Sweden is currently hosting the ESG Project secretariat, called the International Project Office (IPO). The ESG Project IPO has previously been hosted at the United Nations University in Bonn, Germany (2009–2012), Lund University in Sweden (2012–2018), and Utrecht University in the Netherlands (2019–2024).

== Critique ==
The idea of earth system governance (ESG) has been criticized for being too top-down, for placing too much emphasis on global governance structures. According to Mike Hulme, ESG represents an attempt to "geopolitically engineer" our way out of the climate crisis. He questions whether the climate is governable and argues that it is way too optimistic and even hubristic to attempt to control the global climate by universal governance regimes. Others regard this particular interpretation of the ESG concept as being too narrow and misleading.

Andy Stirling criticized the ESG concept by saying: "No matter how much a governance model might emphasize 'polycentric' co-ordination (rather than top-down hierarchy), if it remains subordinated to a particular agency and specific ends, then the process is equally about control." Ariel Salleh compared ESG with a "proto bio-political regime". She also stated that "What is minimized in the ESG analysis are major historical tensions between capital and labor, core and periphery, human production and natural reproduction". On the other hand, political scientist Frank Biermann from Utrecht University responded to that criticism by saying that there has been "a misunderstanding that this community would study only global institutions" due to the wording of earth system in the term.

Another line of criticism is to link "earth system governance research with dangers of universal, Northern-based intellectual dominance that marginalizes different epistemologies and in particular actors from the Global South". On the other hand, Frank Biermann pointed out that "Much research on earth system governance has directly criticized ecomodernism, technocracy and postcolonialism, for instance by prioritizing work on "planetary justice", epistemic diversity, decolonializing Western science, or by engaging with ecosocialist and other progressive lines of thinking."

== Example applications ==
Complex and global challenges that ESG scholars investigate include for example as "ocean acidification, land use change, food system disruptions, climate change, environment-induced migration, species extinction, changing regional water cycles, as well as more traditional environmental concerns".

=== Earth system law ===
The concept of earth system law is still in its infancy (as per 2021). It is a sub-discipline of ESG, itself a subfield of earth system sciences analyzed from a social sciences perspective. The definition of earth system law is "an innovative legal imaginary that is rooted in the Anthropocene's planetary context and its perceived socio-ecological crisis". However, a fuller determination of the precise content, purpose, meaning, and scope of earth system law remains a work in progress.

Earth system law is intended to be a more generically applicable framework that spans the entire spectrum of law that is relevant for responding to earth system transformation. Researchers are now looking into questions around the understanding of earth system law, its form and content, as well as its ontological and epistemological orientation.

Building on extant ESG research, earth system law challenges the conception that legal phenomena concerned with mediating the relationship between humans and the environment are to be categorized as environmental laws. Earth system law has the potential to transcend the shortcomings of environmental law, in particular its insufficient understanding and capturing of the complex relations between, and within, social, technical and natural systems.

=== Ocean governance ===
==== UN Decade of Ocean Science for Sustainable Development ====
The UN Decade of Ocean Science for Sustainable Development (UNDOS) is a United Nations Decade that runs from 2021 to 2030, with a vision of "the science we need for the ocean we want". UNDOS offers a framework to strengthen connections and weave partnerships between all communities working to study, conserve, and sustainably use the ocean and its resources. The Decade will boost scientific research in this area. ESG research in relationship to oceans tackles fundamental questions of "who gets what?" (justice and allocation), "who gets to decide?" (democracy and power), "how are current systems maintained?" (architecture and agency), and "how do these systems change?" (in the present: agency, adaptiveness and reflexivity; and in the future: anticipation and imagination).

Scholars of ESG say that their research is instrumental in addressing governance-related needs of UNDOS. First, it can identify salient frames for ocean problems that trigger policy action. Second, it can inform stakeholder involvement by mapping powerful and marginalized interests and suggesting pathways towards more inclusive participation. Third, it can support viable and effective ocean solutions based on insights into political support coalitions and governance design.

Mainstreaming of governance research into ocean science has also been recommended: The ESG community can facilitate this mainstreaming by enhancing knowledge cumulation around ocean issues within the network; engaging more strongly in the production of actionable and action-oriented knowledge; and seeking integration into inter- and transdisciplinary ocean research.

Sub-topics where ESG with regards to ocean governance can be applied are for example governance issues around deep sea mining, ocean acidification, marine biodiversity.

==== High Seas Treaty ====
There is the expectation that a new agreement in ocean law that was reached in 2023 will constitute a major innovation in ESG, and could add more complexity and robustness to existing global ocean governance. This agreement is called the High Seas Treaty or Global Ocean Treaty or the United Nations agreement on biodiversity beyond national jurisdiction (BBNJ Agreement). It was adopted on 19 June 2023 and is a legally binding instrument for the conservation and sustainable use of marine biological diversity of areas beyond national jurisdiction. It falls under the United Nations Convention on the Law of the Sea (UNCLOS).

Social science research on ESG can offer insights on the factors that have promoted successful negotiation, design, and implementation of international environmental agreements that are similar to the High Seas Treaty. Such findings relevant to those negotiations include regime theory, critical theory, science and technology studies, and coupled human and natural systems. The negotiations for such an agreement involved a large number of interested states and stakeholders with vested interests. This means that negotiators faced the classic dilemma of identifying obligations and commitments that are demanding enough to solve the problem but not so demanding that states will oppose their inclusion in an agreement or reject membership in an agreement that includes them.

Research on ESG helps to understand that negotiators for such a treaty must overcome three major challenges to reach meaningful agreement: (i) the politicization of science, which may inhibit agreement on whether to act, especially in a context of decision-making under uncertainty; (ii) institutional fragmentation and interplay, which make it challenging to add elements to an already crowded ocean governance space in ways that increase coherence and effectiveness; and (iii) the need for the new international legally binding instrument to respond to the complex set of multiple, multilevel, and systemic threats to marine biodiversity beyond national jurisdiction.

=== Artificial intelligence and digitalization ===
Researchers are investigating the impacts, problems, and possibilities surrounding the use of certain emerging technologies—namely, artificial intelligence (AI) and digitalization—in activities relevant to ESG. There is no uniformly techno-optimist or techno-pessimist orientation amongst ESG researchers. Nevertheless, concerns about technology course through the entire ESG agenda.

AI can be used to support public decision-making. ESG researchers pointed out that those interested in adopting AI within their decision-making systems should first ask critical governance questions about the extent to which AI-informed decisions will be democratic, whether implementing such technology will contribute to north–south (in)equality, and the costs and benefits of involving private sector service providers in public sector operations. Examples for such questions that ESG researchers explore include: "How to provide confidence that AI-informed decision-making is democratically sound? [...] What risk comes from government ownership and operation of AI-models and tools – is it any different to the existing management of public institutions and decisions? What are the risks and opportunities presented by AI to community engagement – how can we ensure that people remain involved in the decisions that affect them?"

=== Climate governance ===
Climate governance, in particular research on climate policy, is another application of earth system governance.

Climate governance is the diplomacy, mechanisms and response measures "aimed at steering social systems towards preventing, mitigating or adapting to the risks posed by climate change". A definitive interpretation is complicated by the wide range of political and social science traditions (including comparative politics, political economy and multilevel governance) that are engaged in conceiving and analysing climate governance at different levels and across different arenas. In academia, climate governance has become the concern of geographers, anthropologists, economists and business studies scholars.

Climate governance – that is, effective management of the global climate system – is thus of vital importance. However, building effective collective mechanisms to govern impacts on the climate system at the planetary level presents particular challenges, e.g. the complexity of the relevant science and the progressive refinement of scientific knowledge about our global climate and planetary systems, and the challenge of communicating this knowledge to the general public and to policy makers. There is also the urgency of addressing this issue; the Intergovernmental Panel on Climate Change (IPCC) has underlined that the international community has a narrow window of opportunity to act to keep global temperature rise at safe levels. Modern international climate governance is organized around three pillars: mitigation, adaptation and means of implementation. Under each pillar are many issues and policies, illustrating the many ways climate change affects society.

== See also ==
- Earth system science
- Environmental governance
- Global governance
- Planetary integrity
