= Joyeeta Gupta =

Environmental scientist and academic

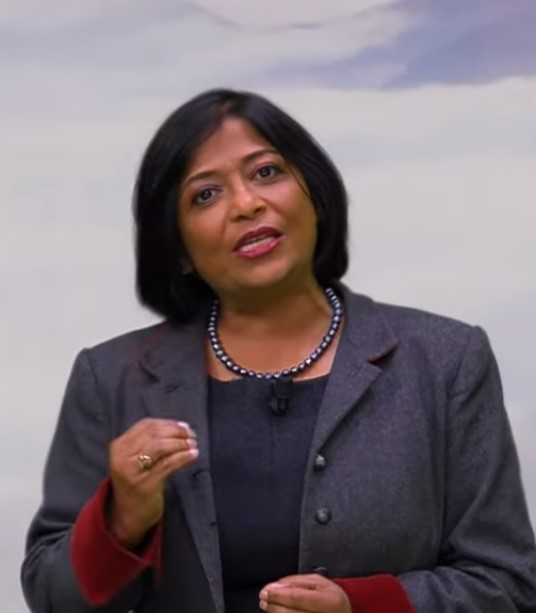
- Born: 12 June 1964 (age 62); Delhi, India
- Education: Vrije Universiteit Amsterdam; Harvard Law School; Gujarat University; Delhi University; Air Force Central School; Loreto Convent School; St. Mary Convent Allahabad
- Awards: Spinoza Prize (2023) Nobel Peace Prize (2007)
- Scientific career
- Workplaces: University of Amsterdam
- Thesis: The climate change convention and developing countries: from conflict to consensus? (1997)
- Website: www.uva.nl/en/profile/g/u/j.gupta/j.gupta.html

Joyeeta Gupta (born in Delhi, India) is a social scientist focusing on environment and development. She is Distinguished Professor of Climate Justice, Sustainability and Global Justice (University of Amsterdam), and is also Professor of Environment and Development in the Global South and holds a water professorship at IHE-Delft Institute for Water Education.

== Recent achievements ==
She is the co-chair (2024-2025) of the UN Secretary General Appointed Group of Ten High-level Representatives of Civil Society, Private Sector and Scientific Community to Promote Science, Technology and Innovation for the SDGs (10-Member-Group) – a component of the UN Technology Facilitation Mechanism. She is a Commissioner in the Global Commission on the Economics of Water, organized by OECD, financed by the Netherlands Government (2022-24). She was Co-chair of the first phase of the Earth Commission (2019-2024), convened by Future Earth and the Global Commons Alliance during which time 22 publications were achieved with a top publication in Nature and in Lancet Planetary Health. Along with Johan Rockström, she did a plenary presentation of the Earth Commission results at the World Economic Forum in Davos in January 2023. She also was co-chair of UNEP's Global Environment Outlook-6 assessing knowledge on the environment and the Sustainable Development Goals. The report and its Summary for Policy Makers were presented to the 4th United Nations Environment Assembly (UNEA) for endorsement by UN Member States at that assembly. The report received the Prose Prize. She was awarded the 2023 Spinoza Prize – the highest distinction in Dutch science and also called the 'Dutch Nobel Prize', the 2022 Piers Sellers prize for world leading contribution to solution-focused climate research, Priestley International Centre for Climate, the 2019 Prose Award for the GEO, the 2015 Atmospheric Science Librarians International Choice Award for her Cambridge University Press Book: History of Global Climate Governance, the 2007 Nobel Peace Prize as an IPCC author, and the 2005 2nd Zayed prize as a Millenium Ecosystem Assessment author. In 2024 she did a concert on Climate Injustice in Four Seasons at the Concertgebouw in Amsterdam and Eindhoven. Her work has been made into a three dimensional art piece in the pop climate museum which the public can interact with. She is also featured in the 'Prize Cupboard' in the Rijksmuseum Boerhaave (museum of science) in Leiden.

== Early life and education ==
Gupta was born in Delhi and moved with her family as her father was regularly transferred to a different city. She studied at St. Mary Convent (Allahabad), Loreto Convent School (Delhi) and at the Air Force Central School (Delhi) where she was the second female school captain. She did her Bachelor's in Economics Honours at Delhi University (Lady Shree Ram College) followed by Law at Gujarat University (Sir. L.A. Shah Law College). She won an Inlaks Foundation fellowship to study at Harvard Law School at Harvard University in Cambridge, USA. Gupta completed her doctoral research in 1997 at Vrije Universiteit Amsterdam, where she studied climate change in the North South context focusing on the perspective of developing countries. Her doctoral research was the first to explore the negotiation challenges facing rich and poor countries in relation to climate change.

== Research and career ==
Gupta is a scholar in institutional aspects of global environmental change and was co-author of the science plan produced by the International Dimensions of Global Environmental Change Programme of the International Human Dimensions Programme. She focuses on Earth System Governance and co-authored the first science and implementation plan of the Earth System Governance Project in 2009. She has an h-index of 71 and more than 21.000 citations on Google Scholar.

In 1993, she joined the Vrije Universiteit Amsterdam where she rose to become Professor on Climate Policy and Law. She has worked since 1989 on climate change and its impacts on developing countries and increasingly on rich poor conflict. She has argued that the long-term objective of the climate convention needs to be based on avoiding harm to people, that the carbon budget needs to be equitably shared, and that emitters need to both reduce their emissions as well as compensate others who suffer as a consequence of the emissions. She has also been working at IHE Delft Institute for Water Education and has been publishing on key water related issues rising to become professor in water law and policy as well. In 2017, she also participated in the design and signature of the Rome Declaration on the Human Right to Water initiated by Pope Francis and the Pontifical Academy of Sciences in Vatican City.

In 2013, she joined the University of Amsterdam as Professor of Environment and Development in the Global South. She became head of the Governance and Inclusive Development Research Group and led a theoretical focus on inclusive development. She co-founded the University's Centre for Sustainable Development Studies. She has acquired more than 60 projects including the prestigious European Research Council Advanced Grant in 2021 which focuses on the challenges of leaving fossil fuels underground. In 2023 she won the Spinoza award (1.5 million euros), the highest scientific award in the Netherlands and is using the money to work on an open science justice lab to develop a draft global constitution- in 2024 she launched the Global Constitution Project and sought participants from across the world.

== Memberships ==
She has been on the scientific steering committees of international programmes including the Steering Committee of the Global Agricultural Research Partnership research programme on Forests, Trees and Agroforestry (2015-2018); and Future Earth's Earth System Governance programme (2008-2018). At the EU level, she was a member of Science Europe's Scientific Committee for the Sciences and the Joint Programming Initiative – Climate Transdisciplinary Advisory Board in Brussels.

At national level, she is on the supervisory board of the SNV Netherlands Development Organization. She has been on the supervisory board of Royal Tropical Institute and Oxfam Novib. Her role in the supervisory boards implies not only being responsible for the substantive work, but also for the financial supervision of organizations that manage > €200 M.

She was the vice-president of the Dutch Commission on Development Cooperation (2011-2019) and member of the Advisory Council on International Affairs (2011-2019), a statutory body advising three Cabinet Ministers. She was a member of the Board of Research for Global Development, WOTRO/N.W.O. (2004-2010). She is currently vice-chair of the Curatorium of the Prins Claus Chair on Equity and Development.

For 2024-2026, she is co-chair of the UN Secretary General Appointed Group of Ten High-level Representatives of Civil Society, Private Sector and Scientific Community to Promote Science, Technology and Innovation for the SDGs (10-Member-Group) – a component of the UN Technology Facilitation Mechanism.

=== Awards and honors ===
- 2025 Membership of the Royal Netherlands Academy of Arts and Sciences.
- 2023 Spinoza Prize, (1.5M euros) the highest distinction in Dutch science and also called the Dutch Nobel Prize.
- 2022 Piers Sellers Prize for world leading contribution to solution-focused climate research, Priestley International Centre for Climate, Leeds University
- 2021 – 2026 ERC Advanced Grant (2.5M Euros) on Climate Change and Fossil Fuels
- 2019 Association of American Publishers PROSE award for Environmental Science awarded to Cambridge University Press Book: Global Environment Outlook-6: Healthy Planet, Healthy People, edited by Paul Ekins, Joyeeta Gupta and Pierre Boileau for UNEP
- 2015 Atmospheric Science Librarians International (ASLI) Choice Award for 2014 in its history category for Cambridge University Press Book: History of Global Climate Governance

== Selected publications ==
=== Books ===
Gupta, J. et J. Allan (2024). "Au nom de ma délégation" Un guide de survie pour les nouveaux négociateurs solitaires sur le changement climatique

Gupta, J., y J. Allen (2024). "En nombre de mi delegación...". Una guía de supervivencia para negociadores nuevos y solitarios del cambio climático

Gupta, J. and J. Allan (2023). On Behalf of My Delegation: A Survival Guide for New and Lonely Climate Negotiators, IISD, Canada. Complete revision of the 2000 book

Gupta, J. (2014). The History of Global Climate Governance, Cambridge University Press, Cambridge. (in Korean) Gupta, J. (2005). Our Simmering Planet: What to do About Global Warming, Zed Publishers, London, p. 178, 2nd edition, p. 339.

Gupta, J. (2001). Our Simmering Planet: What to do About Global Warming, Zed Publishers, London, p. 178.

Gupta, J. (2001). "En Nombre de mi Delegacion …": Un manual para los negociadores de cambio climático de los paises en desarollo, Center for Sustainable Development of the Americas, Washington D.C., p. 104. (Spanish translation of Gupta 2000).

Gupta, J. (2001). "Au nom de ma Délégation … : Guide de survie des négociateurs des pays en développement sur le climat", Center for Sustainable Development of the Americas, Washington D.C., p. 102. (French translation of Gupta 2000).

Gupta, J. (2000). On Behalf of My Delegation: A Guide for Developing Country Climate Negotiators, Center for Sustainable Development of the Americas, Washington D.C., p. 100.

Gupta, J. (1997). The Climate Change Convention and Developing Countries - From Conflict to Consensus? Environment and Policy Series, Kluwer Academic Publishers, Dordrecht, pp. 256.

=== Edited Books ===
Gupta, J., B. Hogenboom, A. Rempel and M. Olofsson, (eds.)(2024). Leaving Fossil Fuels Underground: Actors, Arguments and Approaches in the Global South and Global North. Amsterdam University Press, 2024.

Dellapenna, J. and J. Gupta (eds.) (2021). Water Law, Elgar Encyclopaedia of Environmental Law series, Edward Elgar.

Bogardi, J., J. Gupta, K.D.L. Wasantha Nandalal, L. Salamé, RRP vam Nooijen, N. Kumar, T. Tingsanchali, A. Bhaduri, and A.G. Kolechkina (eds.) (2021). Handbook of Water Resources Management: Discourses, Concepts and Examples, Springer (Water Series), With a Foreword from the President of Hungary, 810 pp.

A. Bhaduri, and A.G. Kolechkina (eds.) (2021). Handbook of Water Resources Management: Discourses, Concepts and Examples, Springer (Water Series), With a Foreword from the President of Hungary, 810 pp.

Joyeeta Gupta, Paul Ekins, and Pierre Boileau (Eds.) (2021). Global Environment Outlook-6: Technical Summary, Cambridge University Press, pp. 105.

Dellapenna, J. and J. Gupta (eds.) (2021). Water Law, Elgar Encyclopedia of Environmental Law series, Edward Elgar.

Pahl-Wostl, C., A. Bhaduri, and J. Gupta (eds.) (2016). Handbook on Water Security, Edward Elgar.

Gupta, J., K. Pfeffer, H. Verrest, M.A.F. Ros-Tonen (eds.) (2015). Geographies of Urban Governance: Advanced Theories, Methods and Practices, Springer.

Gupta, J., N. van der Grijp and O. Kuik (eds.) (2013). Climate Change, Forests and REDD: Lessons for Institutional Design, Routledge. Paperback edition published June 2014.

Gupta, J. and N. van de Grijp (eds.) (2010). Mainstreaming Climate Change in Development Cooperation: Theory, Practice and Implications for the European Union, Cambridge University Press, p. 347.

Dellapenna, J. and J. Gupta (eds.) (2009). The Evolution of the Law and Politics of Water, Springer Verlag, Dordrecht.

Srivastava, L.; J. Gupta et al. (2007). Modernising the Indian Electricity Sector, The Energy Research Institute Publications, New Delhi, p. 322.

Faure, M., J. Gupta and A. Nentjes (eds.) (2003). Climate Change and the Kyoto Protocol: The Role of Institutions and Instruments to Control Global Change, Edward Elgar Publishers, Cheltenham Glos, p. 361.

Van Ierland, E., J. Gupta and M. Kok (eds.) (2003). Issues in International Climate Policy: Theory and Policy, Edward Elgar Publishers, Cheltenham Glos., p. 294.

Gupta, J. and M. Grubb (eds.) (2000). Climate Change and European Leadership: A Sustainable Role for Europe, Environment and Policy Series, Kluwer Academic Publishers, Dordrecht, p. 344.

Vellinga, P., F. Berkhout and J. Gupta (eds.) (1998). Managing a Material World: Reflections on Industrial Ecology, Environment and Policy Series, Kluwer Academic Publishers, Dordrecht, p. 348.

Maya, S. and J. Gupta (eds.) (1996). Joint Implementation: Joint Implementation: Carbon Colonies or Business Opportunities? Weighing the Odds in an Information Vacuum, Southern Centre on Energy and Environment, Zimbabwe, p. 164.

=== Special Issues ===
Gupta, J., C. Vegelin and N. Pouw (2022). Lessons Learnt from International Environmental Agreements: Celebrating 20 Years of INEA, INEA 22(2).

Gupta, J. and L. Lebel (2020) (eds.). Access and Allocation in Earth System Governance, INEA 20(2).

Schwartz, K., J. Gupta and M. Tutusaus (eds.) (2018). Special Section on Inclusive Development and Urban Water Services, Habitat, 73 (March).

Dooley, K., J. Gupta and A. Patwardhan (eds.) (2018). Achieving 1.5°C and Climate Justice, International Environmental Agreements: Politics, Law and Economics, 18(1).

Bavinck, M. and J. Gupta (eds.) (2017). Inclusive Development and Coastal Adaptiveness: A Global Assessment, Oceans and Coastal Management (IF 2.174), 150.

Pouw, N. and J. Gupta (eds.) (2017). Sustainability Science (Inclusive development: A Multidisciplinary Issue), COSUST, 24 (February).

Bavinck, M. and J. Gupta (eds.) (2014). Sustainability Science (Legal Pluralism, Governance and Aquatic Systems), COSUST, 11.

Pahl-Wostl, C. and J. Gupta (eds.) (2013). Global Water Governance: Challenges and Future Scope, Ecology and Society, 18.

Pahl-Wostl, C., J. Gupta, and D. Petry, (2008). Global Governance of Water: Trends, Processes and Ideas for the Future, Global Governance, 14(4).

Gupta, J. (ed.) (2007). Special Issue on The Multi-Level Governance Challenge of Climate Change, Environmental Sciences, 4(3).

Gupta, J. and K. Tienhaara (2006). Special Issue on Sustainable Development and Investment, International Environmental Agreements: Politics, Law and Economics, 6(4).

Vellinga, P., R. Howarth and J. Gupta (eds.) (2002). Special Issue on Global Environmental Governance, International Environmental Agreements: Politics, Law and Economics, 2(4).

Metz, B. and J. Gupta (2001). Special Issue on Post Kyoto Measures, International Environmental Agreements: Politics, Law and Economics, 1(4).

=== Selected Papers ===
Gupta, J., X. Bai, D.M. Liverman, J. Rockström, D. Qin, B. Stewart-Koster, J.C. Rocha, L. Jacobson, J.F. Abrams, L.S. Andersen, D.I. Armstrong McKay, G. Bala, S.E. Bunn, D. Ciobanu, F. DeClerck, K. Ebi, L. Gifford, C. Gordon, S. Hasan, N. Kanie, T. M. Lenton, S. Loriani, A. Mohamed, N. Nakicenovic, D. Obura, D. Ospina, K. Prodani, C. Rammelt, B. Sakschewski, J. Scholtens, T. Tharammal, D. van Vuuren, P.H. Verburg, R. Winkelmann, C. Zimm, E. Bennett, A. Bjørn, S. Bringezu, W. Broadgate, H. Bulkeley, B. Crona, P. Green, H. Hoff, L. Huang, M. Hurlbert, C.Y.A.Inoue, Ş. Kilkiş, S. J. Lade, J. Liu, I. Nadeem, C. Ndehedehe, C. Okereke, I. Otto, S. Pedde, L. Pereira, L. Schulte-Uebbing, J.D. Tàbara, W. de Vries, G. Whiteman, C. Xiao, X. Xu, N. Zafra-Calvo, X. Zhang (2024). A just world on a safe planet: Earth system boundaries, transformations and translation, Lancet Planetary Health

Gupta, J., Y. Chen, D. Armstrong McKay, P. Fezzigna, G. Gentile, A. Karg, L. van Vliet, S. Lade, L. Jacobson (2024). Applying Earth System Justice to phase out fossil fuels: Learning from the injustice of adopting 1.5°C over 1°C, International Environmental Agreements: Politics, Law and Economics

Kort R, Arts K, Antó JM, Berg MP, Cepella G, Cole J, van Doorn A, van Gorp T, Grootjen M, Gupta J, et al. (2023). Outcomes from the First European Planetary Health Congress at ARTIS, Amsterdam, Challenges. 14(4):49

Rockström, J., Kotzé, L.J., Milutinović, S., Biermann, F.; Brovkin, V.; Donges, J. F.; Ebbesson, J.; French, D.; Gupta, J.; Kim, R. E.; Lenton, T. M.; Lenzi, D.; Nakicenovic, N.; Neumann, B.; Schuppert, F.; Winkelmann, R.; Bosselmann, K.; Folke, C.; Lucht, W.; Schlosberg, D.; Richardson, K.; Steffen, W.; and P. Schlosser (2024). The planetary commons: A new paradigm for safeguarding Earth-regulating systems in the Anthropocene, PNAS

Bai, X. et al. (2024). Translating Earth System Boundaries for Cities and Business: Principles and Protocol, Nature Sustainability

Heras, A. and J. Gupta (2023). Fossil fuels, stranded assets, and the energy transition in the Global South: a systematic literature review, WIRES Climate Change

Muchemi JG, Gupta J, McCall MK, Pfeffer K. Nationally determined contributions-enhanced climate mitigation actions and safeguards (ECMAS) indicator framework for helping countries design sustainable and inclusive net-zero emissions reduction outcomes. Carbon Footprints 2023;2:17

McDonnell, C. and J. Gupta (2023). Beyond divest vs. engage: a review of the role of institutional investors in an inclusive fossil fuel phase-out, Climate Policy

Gupta, J. (2023). We need to collectively redefine development: Q&A with Joyeeta Gupta, One Earth, 6(11): 1450-1452.

Gifford, L., D. Liverman, J. Gupta, L. Jacobson (2023). Governing for a safe and just future with science-based targets: Opportunities and limitations, Climate and Development

Stewart-Koster, B. et al. (2023). How can we live within the safe and just Earth system boundaries for blue water?, Nature Sustainability

Herzog-Hawelka, N. and J. Gupta (2023). The role of (multi)national oil and gas companies in leaving fossil fuels underground: A systematic literature review, Energy Research and Social Science, 23.

Gupta, J., Vegelin, C. (2023) Inclusive development, leaving no one behind, justice and the sustainable development goals. Int Environ Agreements

Rockström, J., Gupta, J., Qin, D. et al. Safe and just Earth system boundaries, Nature (2023)
