= Frank Biermann =

German political scientist

- Born: 1967 (age 58–59)
- Occupation: University professor
- Known for: Global environmental and sustainability politics; pioneer of earth system governance paradigm
- Awards: Volvo Environment Prize (2024), ISA Distinguished Scholar Award in Environmental Studies (2021)
- Website: www.frankbiermann.org

Frank Biermann (born 1967) is a German political scientist and professor at Utrecht University in the Netherlands. His research interests are in "global institutions and organisations in the sustainability domain". He was the founder in 2006 and first chair (for ten years) of the Earth System Governance Project. From 2018 until 2024 he directed a 2.5-million EUR research programme on the steering effects of the Sustainable Development Goals. This was funded through a European Research Council Advanced Grant.

Biermann's statements on various topics have been mentioned in the media, for example in CNN, BBC News, and Time magazine.

He has received several awards, most recently the Volvo Environment Prize in 2024 for "defining new pathways for international environmental governance in a period of global change", and in 2021 the Distinguished Scholar Award in Environmental Studies by the International Studies Association. Biermann is an elected Fellow of the World Academy of Art and Science.

== Education ==
Biermann received a master’s degree in Political Science in 1993 from Free University of Berlin (Freie Universität Berlin), followed by a PhD in political science from the same university in 1997. His PhD thesis won the Joachim Tiburtius Prize, a prize that is awarded annually for the three best doctoral dissertations of the three Berlin universities. In 1998, he was awarded a postdoctoral fellowship at the Kennedy School of Government of Harvard University.

He achieved the post-doctoral degree of habilitation in political science in 2001 also from Freie Universität Berlin. He received a master's degree in International Law by the University of Aberdeen in 1994.

== Career ==
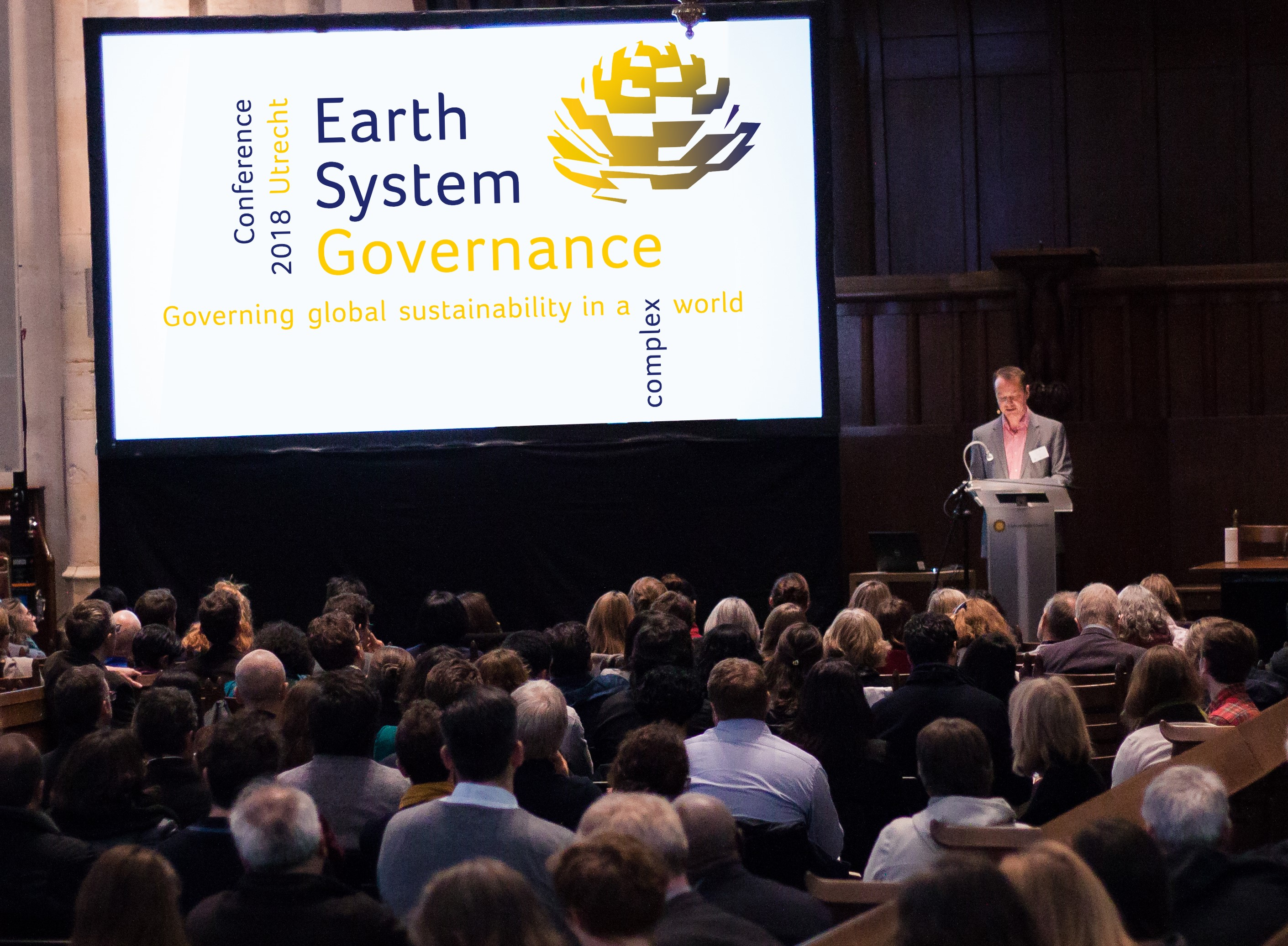
Frank Biermann opening the 2018 Utrecht Conference on Earth System Governance

In 2003, Biermann was appointed as professor of Political Science and of Environmental Policy Analysis at VU University Amsterdam, The Netherlands. From 2003 to 2015, Biermann was head of the Department of Environmental Policy Analysis at the same university. During this time, from 2007-2014, he was director of the Netherlands Research School for Socio-Economic and Natural Sciences of the Environment, a national alliance of 11 institutes.

Since late 2015, Frank Biermann is a research professor of Global Sustainability Governance with the Copernicus Institute of Sustainable Development at Utrecht University in the Netherlands.

Biermann is also a member of the Science Advisory Council of the Stockholm Environment Institute and an affiliate of the Lee Kuan Yew School of Public Policy’s Initiative on Environment and Sustainability at the National University of Singapore. He also chairs the Board of Trustees of the Earth System Governance Foundation.

=== Research ===
Biermann’s research and publications have contributed to several areas of global sustainability policy and governance. This includes work on the effectiveness and reform of international organizations and bureaucracies, the role of multilateral treaty regimes, the protection of climate refugees, the impacts of the Sustainable Development Goals (SDGs), the politics of science, novel conceptualizations of planetary justice, climate policy and the restrictive governance of climate engineering, and fragmented architectures of global governance.

Biermann pioneered the earth system governance paradigm in global change research in 2005 and was the founder and first chair (2008-2018) of the Earth System Governance Project, a global research network of sustainability scholars. From 2018 until 2024 he directed a 2.5-million EUR research programme on the steering effects of the SDGs.

=== Advocacy and outreach ===
Frank Biermann has regularly engaged in public debates about reforming global sustainability governance. For example, Biermann has called for the establishment of a World Environment Organization in 2000 and the negotiation of an International Agreement on Protecting Climate Refugees in 2010. He has spoken in the United Nations General Assembly in 2014 during an Interactive Dialogue on Harmony with Nature. This fed into the Harmony with Nature report of the Secretary-General of the UN.

Ever since the start of the Sustainable Development Goals process in 2015, Biermann has spoken in various fora about reforming these global goals, based on relevant research projects which he has been leading. An example of such a forum is the Global Citizen and Youth Empowerment System Conference at the United Nations headquarters in New York in 2024. He has also published with colleagues a number of global assessments and policy proposals on the SDGs, for example in the academic journals Nature Sustainability and Science.

Regarding climate engineering, Biermann states that "I increasingly fear that the slow pace of global climate policies will lead to dangerous calls for reckless climate engineering or geoengineering". For this reason, he together with colleagues, has developed an initiative for an International Non-Use Agreement on Solar Geoengineering which was launched in January 2022 with an open letter. This letter in support of such a non-use agreement has been signed by over 500 scientists from dozens of countries, and endorsed by about 2000 civil society organisations (as of 2024). The goal of the letter was to make it clear "that the academic community didn’t want governments to develop solar geoengineering technologies" according to reporting in Time magazine which quoted Frank Biermann. He also said about this letter: "it’s a sign that anti-geoengineering scientists are getting more organized". On the same topic, in a CNN article in 2023, Frank Biermann is quoted as follows about solar geoengineering: “It’s very risky. It cannot be governed. It’s unethical,” and “And it is one of the biggest dangers in the current climate policies.” A BBC News article in the same year quoted him as saying "If the majority of countries object to the deployment… the political cost for any country to do it unilaterally is extremely high."

=== Editorships ===
Biermann is the founding editor of the Elsevier journal Earth System Governance, an open access journal launched in 2009. This journal is highly ranked in the fields of international relations (fifth rank out of 159 journals), political science (tenth out of 315), and environmental policy (fifth out of 176). Data from the journal's publisher Elsevier shows that the journal has a CiteScore of 9.0 and an Impact Factor of 4.4 (as of 2024). In the SCImago Journal Rank (SJR) indicator this journal appears as a Q1 journal (first quartile) in various disciplines.

He also edits three ongoing book series:

- Co-editor of the book series on Earth System Governance with MIT Press, together with Oran R. Young since 2009.
- Editor of the book series on Earth System Governance by Cambridge University Press, established in 2018.
- Co-editor of the Cambridge Elements in Earth System Governance series, launched in 2019.

== Awards ==
- In 2024: Volvo Environment Prize for "defining new pathways for international environmental governance in a period of global change"
- In 2021: Distinguished Scholar Award in Environmental Studies by the International Studies Association. This award is "a lifetime achievement award and recognises outstanding scholars whose long history of excellent research and teaching has had substantial impact on fields associated with international relations and environmental issues."
- In 2019: Ecological Society of America’s Innovations in Sustainability Science Award. This award "recognizes the authors of a peer-reviewed paper published in the past five years exemplifying leading-edge work on solution pathways to sustainability challenges". The price was for a paper on "Bright spots: seeds of a good Anthropocene" in Frontiers in Ecology and the Environment in 2016 where Frank Biermann was a co-author.
- In 2018: Biermann received a European Research Council Advanced Grant worth EUR 2.5 million to conduct research into the Sustainable Development Goals set by the United Nations in 2015
- In 2013: Societal Impact Award of VU University Amsterdam. The jury report explained: "Frank Biermann's research is impressive and socially relevant. It fits in perfectly with the values and traditions of the VU. Bierman is an excellent scientist with an enormous list of publications. This places him at the top of his field."
- Biermann is an elected Fellow of the World Academy of Art and Science.

== Publications ==
Biermann has authored, edited or co-edited 19 books and published over 200 articles in peer-reviewed journals and academic books. His h-index as calculated in Google Scholar is 80. The h-index is an author-level metric that measures both the productivity and citation impact of the publications.

Selected books where Biermann was sole author or co-editor include:

- Biermann, Frank, Thomas Hickmann and Carole-Anne Sénit, editors. 2022. The Political Impact of the Sustainable Development Goals. Transforming Governance through Global Goals? Cambridge, UK: Cambridge University Press
- Biermann, Frank, and Rakhyun E. Kim, editors. 2020. Architectures of Earth System Governance. Institutional Complexity and Structural Transformation. Cambridge, UK: Cambridge University Press
- Biermann, Frank, and Eva Lövbrand, editors. 2019. Anthropocene Encounters. New Directions in Green Political Thinking. Cambridge, UK: Cambridge University Press.
- Kanie, Norichika, and Frank Biermann, editors. 2017. Governing through Goals: Sustainable Development Goals as Governance Innovation. Cambridge, Mass.: MIT Press. 333 pages. Translated into Chinese by Beijing Normal University Press, 2018.
- Biermann, Frank (2014). Earth system governance: world politics in the anthropocene. Cambridge, Massachusetts: The MIT Press. The late Will Steffen, for example, commented on this book as follows: "A particular strength of the book is the integration of the scientific underpinning of the Anthropocene with both analytical and normative approaches to effective governance."
