= Earth System Governance Project =

Social science research programme

- Abbreviation: ESG Project
- Formation: 2009; 17 years ago (planning phase 2006-2008)
- Founder: Developed under IHDP
- Type: Nonprofit organization, network or alliance
- Purpose: Support the research community for earth system governance through networking, task forces, conferences, publications
- Headquarters: Uppsala University, Sweden (from 2025 onwards)
- Region served: Worldwide
- Co-chairs: Cristina Inoue and Jonathan Pickering
- Funding: Various (for example Uppsala University, Zennström Philanthropies, Earth System Governance Foundation)
- Website: www.earthsystemgovernance.org

The Earth System Governance Project (ESG Project) is a global research network that "aims to advance knowledge at the interface between global environmental change and governance. The network connects and mobilizes scholars from the social sciences and humanities researching at local and global scales".

The ESG Project has its origins in an international program called the International Human Dimensions Programme on Global Environmental Change. In its current form, the ESG Project began in January 2009. Over time, it has evolved into a broader research alliance that builds on an international network of research centers, lead faculty, senior research fellows and research fellows. It is now the largest social science research network in the area of governance and global environmental change.

The Climate Change Leadership Unit at Uppsala University in Sweden is currently hosting the ESG Project secretariat, called the International Project Office (IPO). The ESG Project IPO has previously been hosted at the United Nations University in Bonn, Germany (2009–2012), Lund University in Sweden (2012–2018), and Utrecht University in the Netherlands (2019–2024).

== Aims ==
The ESG Project aims to "Expand the global mobilization of earth system governance researchers; stimulate and facilitate research collaborations; Inform and advise at the science-policy interface."

The project also examines problems of the global commons, as well as more local problems such as air pollution, water pollution, desertification and soil degradation. Due to natural interdependencies, local environmental pollution can be transformed into global changes. Therefore, the ESG Project looks at institutions and governance processes both local and globally.

== Structure ==
=== Members ===
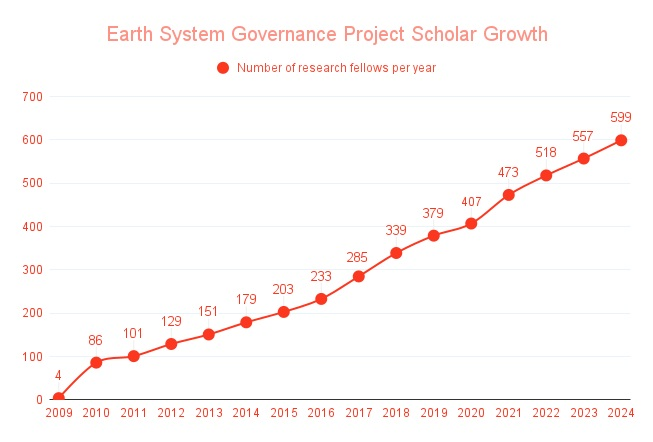
Growth in scholars formally associated with the ESG Project over time, culminating in 599 scholars at the end of 2024

The ESG Project currently (at the end of 2024) has 599 members (also called research fellows), from 57 countries across all continents. In total, there are around 6000 scholars, professionals and students who engage with the network indirectly via social media and the newsletter. This global network of experts consists of people from different academic and cultural backgrounds.

=== Secretariat ===
The secretariat, called the International Project Office (IPO) is hosted by the Climate Change Leadership Unit at the Department of Earth Sciences, Uppsala University, Sweden.

The secretariat ensures the functioning of this virtual international network. It is the focal point for management and administration, as well as for the communication and network development efforts of the ESG Project.

=== Scientific steering committee and chairs ===
The ESG Project operates under the direction of a Scientific Steering Committee (SSC). The role of this committee is to guide the implementation of the Earth System Governance Science Plan. For the first ten years, until 2018, the committee was chaired by Frank Biermann, the network's founder. Since 2019, the committee relies on system of rotating leadership, with two co-chairs elected for two years. The SSC currently has 13 members (as of August 2025) from diverse disciplines and geographical regions.

=== Science and implementation plans ===
An international group of experts came together in 2006 in the Scientific Planning Committee, chaired by Frank Biermann. This committee wrote the first Science and Implementation Plan (SIP) drawing on input for various drafts discussed at global events and conferences. Many scholars and practitioners contributed ideas, advice, and feedback. In 2009, this first SIP was published. In this plan, conceptual problems, cross-cutting themes, flagship projects, and policy relevance were outlined in detail.

Beginning in 2015, discussions were held at ESG Project conferences around a new SIP. In 2016 a group of lead authors was selected. After extensive review by the ESG Project's members, the second Science and Implementation Plan was launched at the 2018 Utrecht Conference on Earth System Governance.

== Funding sources ==
The National Science Foundation of the United States provided about US$15,000 each year since 2015 via Future Earth, an international research platform. This money supports annual meetings of the scientific steering committee.

The project does not charge membership fees. Several universities support the project financially, as does the Earth System Governance Foundation. This foundation is a "non-profit charitable organization under Dutch law, created to help channel support from a variety of sources to the earth system governance research community".

Funding for the secretariat, the IPO, has been provided from the universities that so far have hosted the secretariat:

- 2009: in the first year, the secretariat was located within the secretariat of the International Human Dimensions Programme
- 2009 to 2011: United Nations University in Bonn, Germany
- 2011 to 2018: Lund University, Sweden (with support by the Lund University Centre for Sustainability Studies)
- 2019 to 2024: Utrecht University in The Netherlands (with core funding by Utrecht's Faculty of Geosciences)
- 2025 - ongoing: Uppsala University in Sweden (with support from the Climate Change Leadership unit, UUniCORN, and primarily, Zennström Philanthropies).

== Activities ==
=== Global networking with research centers ===
The ESG Project is supported by a global alliance of ESG Research Centers. Currently, 18 universities and institutes are involved. Many of these universities have hosted the annual conferences of the ESG Project, including the universities of East Anglia, VU Amsterdam, Australian National University in Canberra, Colorado State University, Lund University, University of Nairobi, Radboud University Nijmegen, Tokyo Institute of Technology, University of Toronto, and Utrecht University.

=== Publications ===
There are four major publication series of the ESG Project:

- The Earth System Governance Journal was launched in 2019 (an open access publication with Elsevier). There are 25 volumes as of August 2025. The journal is open access and designed to integrate discourses from local to global in governance research, with a focus on earth-system processes. According to the journal's publisher, the CiteScore of this journal is currently 10.2 and its Impact Factor is 4.6. The journal's h-index is 23.
- The book series on earth system governance by the MIT Press is designed to publish key research findings from members of the Earth System Governance Project and others, with a preference for cutting-edge monographs. Books in this series offer perspectives from a variety of disciplines, levels of governance and methods with the common aim to analyze current systems of earth system governance with a view to increased understanding and possible improvements and reform.
- The Cambridge Elements series on Earth System Governance focuses on current governance research relevant for practitioners and scientists. The series is aimed at providing ideas for policy improvements and analyses of socio-ecological systems by interdisciplinary and influential scholars.
- To mark the 10-year anniversity of the ESG Project, the Project collaborated with Cambridge University Press to summarize research conclusions in 2019. Eleven books were published in this series.

=== Organizing conferences ===
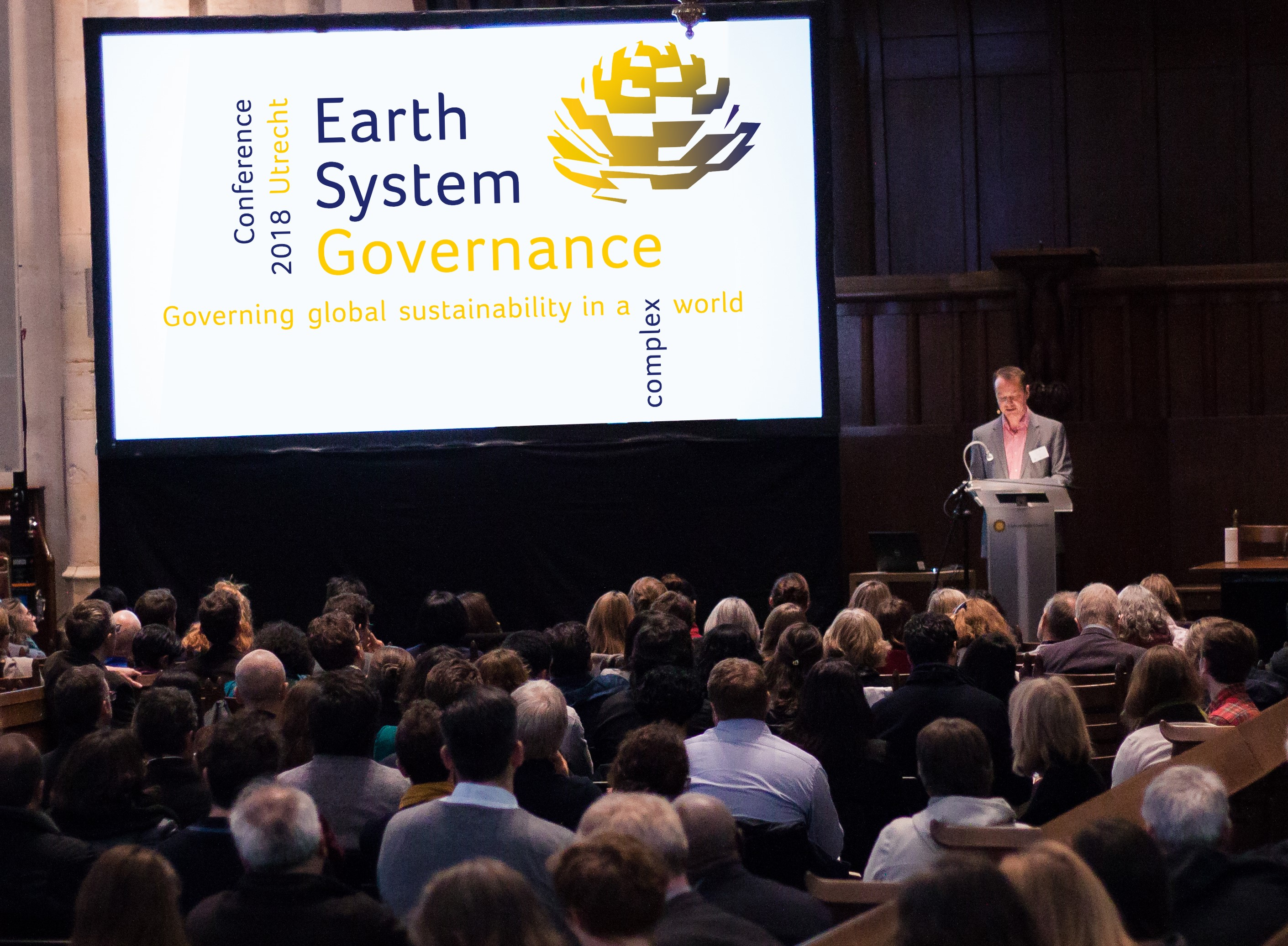
Frank Biermann opening the 2018 Utrecht Conference on Earth System Governance

Since 2007, the ESG Project has organized major scientific conferences on topics of governance and global environmental change:

- 2007 Amsterdam Conference on the Human Dimensions of Global Environmental Change: 'Earth System Governance: Theories and Strategies for Sustainability'.
- 2008 Berlin Conference on the Human Dimension of Global Environmental Change: 'Long-Term Policies: Governing Social-Ecological Change'.
- 2009 Amsterdam Conference on the Human Dimensions of Global Environmental Change: 'Earth System Governance: People, Places, and the Planet'.
- 2010 Berlin Conference on the Human Dimensions of Global Environmental Change: 'Social dimensions of environmental change and governance'.
- 2011 Colorado Conference on Earth System Governance: 'Crossing Boundaries and Building Bridges'.
- 2012 Lund Conference on Earth System Governance: 'Towards Just and Legitimate Earth System Governance'.
- 2013 Tokyo Conference on Earth System Governance: 'Complex Architectures, Multiple Agents'.
- 2014 Norwich Conference on Earth System Governance: 'Allocation and Access in the Anthropocene'.
- 2015 Canberra Conference on Earth System Governance: 'Democracy and Resilience in the Anthropocene'.
- 2016 Nairobi Conference on Earth System Governance: 'Confronting Complexity and Inequality'.
- 2017 Lund Conference on Earth System Governance: 'Allocation & Access in a Warming and Increasingly Unequal World'. This conference was co-hosted by Lund University during its 350-year celebration.
- 2018 Utrecht Conference on Earth System Governance: 'Governing Global Sustainability in a Complex World'.
- 2019 Mexico Conference on Earth System Governance: 'Urgent Transformations and Earth System Governance: Towards Sustainability and Justice'.
- In 2020, Bratislava was meant to be the host, but the conference was rescheduled for 2021 due to the COVID-19 pandemic.
- 2022 Toronto Conference: 'Bridging Sciences and Societies for Sustainability Transformations'.
- 2023 Nijmegen, The Netherlands: 'Radboud Conference on Earth System Governance'.
- 2024 Online event: Earth System Governance Forum on 'Re-imagining Earth System Governance in an Era of Polycrisis'.
- 2025 Johannesburg, South Africa in a collaboration between the Transformations Community and the ESG Project: ‘Navigating Sustainability Transformations Towards Justice and Equity’.

=== Organizing taskforces and working groups ===
Taskforces are formal groups that mobilize scholars to collaboratively engage with key issues of governance of the environment and sustainability, within a well-defined research area and in alignment with the Earth System Governance research agenda. Taskforces are community-driven, commonly led by senior Research Fellows or Lead Faculty. There are currently nine active task forces: Earth-Space Governance, Planetary Justice, Earth System Law, Ocean Governance, Anticipatory Governance, Sustainable Development Goals, Knowledge Cumulation, Climate Governance, and Governance of Nature and Biodiversity.

Working groups are flexible research collaborations with more narrow or specific focus areas and commonly with limited time horizons. These groups either bring together a sub-community within a Taskforce or else are self-standing and mobilize scholars to study an unexplored area of earth system governance research. There are currently eight active Working Groups: Governance of Social-Ecological Systems, Decarbonization, Planetary Health Justice, Democracy, Urban, Asia-Pacific, Carbon Removal and Environment, Representation and Rights.

=== Interacting with affiliated projects ===
In addition to its core activities, such as conferences, taskforces and working groups, the ESG Project interacts with many smaller research projects that have been formally affiliated with the larger network. Such affiliated projects are formally accepted by the ESG Project's scientific steering committee, and its research findings are typically discussed at the annual conferences of the ESG Project.

Some of the affiliated projects specifically focus on the United Nations' Sustainable Development Goals for 2030, for example the GlobalGoals Project (from 2020 to 2025, funded by the European Research Council through an Advanced Grant awarded to Professor Frank Biermann).

Examples of other affiliated projects that are current (as of 2024) or recently completed include:

- Sustainability Governance of China’s Global Infrastructure Investments (SGAIN)
- SocioEconomic Systems and Earth Systems
- Transformations Community
- Governing the EU’s Climate and Energy Transition in Turbulent Times (GOVTRAN) (2018 to 2021, funded by Erasmus+ programme of the European Union)
- LO-ACT: Low Carbon Action in Ordinary Cities, a five-year project that started in 2019 and was funded by the European Research Council (ERC) under the European Union's Horizon 2020 research and innovation programme
- Climate Backlash: Contentious Reactions to Policy Action (BACKLASH), a five-year project that started in 2021, funded by the European Research Council (ERC) under the European Union's Horizon 2020 research and innovation programme.
- GreenDeal-NET: Governing the EU's Transition towards Climate Neutrality and Sustainability, formed in 2022 and co-funded through the EU's Erasmus+ programme

== Impacts ==
The ESG Project does not take policy positions as a network. However, its lead scientists have initiated many activities to support political decision-making and inform policy makers. For example, in 2011, the lead faculty of the ESG Project launched a global assessment on international environmental governance. This publication drew on ongoing research on the institutional framework for sustainable development in the period leading up to the 2012 United Nations Conference on Sustainable Development in Rio de Janeiro. The outcome was an article in Science in 2012, written by 33 leading scholars from the ESG Project as a blueprint for reform of strengthening earth system governance.

In 2011, more than twenty Nobel Prize laureates, several leading policy-makers and renowned thinkers on global sustainability met for the Third Nobel Laureate Symposium on Global Sustainability at the Royal Swedish Academy of Sciences in Stockholm. The Nobel Laureate Symposium concluded with the Stockholm Memorandum. This document mentioned earth system governance prominently and called for "strengthening of earth system governance as a priority for coherent global action". It was submitted to the High-level Panel on Global Sustainability appointed by the UN Secretary General and fed into the preparations for the 2012 UN Conference on Sustainable Development (Rio+20).

In 2014, the then project's chair Frank Biermann was invited to speak in the United Nations General Assembly during an Interactive Dialogue on Harmony with Nature. This fed into the Harmony with Nature report of the Secretary-General of the UN.

In 2022, members of the ESG Project, along with many natural scientists, took the initiative to call for an "International Non-Use Agreement on Solar Geoengineering". The authors demand that "Governments and the United Nations need to take effective political control and restrict the development of solar geoengineering technologies before it is too late."

In general, there is widespread support for the ESG Project in the scientific community, which is reflected in the size of the research network and in various publications by experts.

== Challenges ==
The ongoing funding of the secretariat (International Project Office) is a challenge from time to time, just like it is for many other knowledge networks or alliances.

== History ==
In 2001, four global change research programs (DIVERSITAS, International Geosphere-Biosphere Programme (IGBP), World Climate Research Programme, and International Human Dimensions Programme on Global Environmental Change (IHDP) agreed to intensify co-operation through setting up an overarching Earth System Science Partnership. The research communities represented in this partnership said in the 2001 Amsterdam Declaration on Global Change that the earth system now operates "well outside the normal state exhibited over the past 500,000 years" and that "human activity is generating change that extends well beyond natural variability—in some cases, alarmingly so—and at rates that continue to accelerate." To cope with this challenge, the four global change research programs have called "urgently" for strategies for Earth System management.

In March 2007, the Scientific Committee of the IHDP mandated the drafting of the Science Plan of the ESG Project. The IHDP was the overarching social science program in the field at that time. For this drafting work a Scientific Planning Committee was appointed and chaired by Professor Frank Biermann, who was affiliated with VU University Amsterdam. This committee drafted in 2006-2008 the ESG Project's first Science and Implementation Plan. Biermann also became in 2009 the chair of the Scientific Steering Committee, until he stepped down in 2018. Since then, the Project is led by a Scientific Steering Committee that operates with rotating co-chairs.

The ESG Project builds on the results of an earlier long-term research program, the IHDP core project "Institutional Dimensions of Global Environmental Change" (IDGEC). In 2009, the ESG Project began.

Since the termination of the IHDP in 2014, the ESG Project operates independently as an international, self-funded research alliance.

In 2015 the ESG Project became affiliated with of the overarching international research platform Future Earth. However, links between Future Earth and the ESG Project have remained weak.

== See also ==
- Earth System Science Partnership
- Environmental governance
- Global Carbon Project
- Global governance
- Global Land Project
- World Climate Research Programme
- Urbanization and Global Environmental Change Project
