= Paleogeoscience =

Paleogeosciences are those associated with the past states or processes associated with Earth science or geoscience. Earth science or geoscience is an all-embracing term referring to the fields of science dealing with planet Earth. These studies of Earth's history encompass the Biosphere, Cryosphere, Hydrosphere, Atmosphere, and Lithosphere; the Geosphere. One of the most socially prominent facets of the paleogeosciences would be their applications to Earth's changing climate system.

== Etymology ==
The term "Paleogeoscience" was coined by the Collaboration and Cyberinfrastructure for Paleogeosciences (C4P) research coordination network (RCN), a National Science Foundation EarthCube funded project intending to foster collaboration among paleogeoscientists, paleobiologists, bioinformaticists, stratigraphers, geochronologists, geographers, data scientists, and computer scientists with an aim to dramatically improve the application of modern data management approaches, data mining technologies, and computational methods to better analyze data within the paleogeosciences and other domains and disciplines.

== Definition ==
"Paleogeoscience" is the collective term for geologic studies that pertain to past geological processes. It combines paleoenvironmental and paleobiologial perspectives towards the goal of furthering our understanding of the interactions between life and the Earth through time. It encompasses subjects such as Paleobiology, Paleoclimatology, Geochemistry, Geochronology, Stratigraphy, Paleobotany, Paleogeography, and more. Goals of paleogeosciences include understanding and recreating the Earth System over time for use in understanding the future of the Earth. It uses tangible data and proxy data.

See Resources section for links to catalogs of hundreds of resources for data, software, and sample collections pertaining to many realms of paleogeoscience.

== Resources ==
NSF EarthCube Paleogeoscience RCN Catalog of Software Resources

NSF EarthCube Paleogeoscience RCN Catalog of Physical Sample Repository Resources

NSF EarthCube Paleogeoscience RCN Catalog of Database Resources

OGC Catalog Service web service primer and instructions for accessing NSF EarthCube Paleogeoscience RCN Catalogs
