= Research School for Socio-Economic and Natural Sciences of the Environment =

The Research School for Socio-Economic and Natural Sciences of the Environment (SENSE Research School) is a joint venture for integrated environmental and sustainability research and multidisciplinary PhD training in the Netherlands. The school was accredited by the Royal Netherlands Academy of Arts and Sciences (KNAW) during 1997–2006, was not accredited during 2007, and in 2007 had applied for reaccreditation by a revamped KNAW successor. It was reaccredited in 2008 and 2014. In 2007 the program listed 80 Ph.D. courses.

In 2013, there were 600 Ph.D. students affiliated with the program.

== Members ==
It is based on a partnership between (departments of) eleven Dutch academic institutions (nine universities and two institutes):

- Groningen University - Center for Energy and Environmental Studies
- Leiden University - Institute of Environmental Sciences
- Open University Herleen - School of Science
- Netherlands Environmental Assessment Agency
- Radboud University Nijmegen - Department of Environmental Science
- University of Amsterdam - Institute for Biodiversity and Ecosystem Dynamics
- University of Twente - Water Engineering & Management Department and Faculty of Geo-Information Science and Earth Observation
- IHE Delft Institute for Water Education
- Utrecht University - Copernicus Institute for Sustainable Development and Innovation
- VU University Amsterdam - Department of Ecological Science and Institute for Environmental Studies
- Wageningen University - Wageningen Institute for Environment and Climate Research

== Climate change ==
The program was to be subsidized by the Dutch Ministry of Environment during 2007-2009 "for the specific purpose of organizing a process of knowledge exchange, which is dedicated to the determination of the 50 most pressing policy-relevant research questions related to environmental and climate change issues in the coming years."

The program's large number of Ph.D. students was used in an unusual way in 2013. They were called upon for use in rapid vetting of a draft climatic change report in a crowd-sourcing mode. The process initially sought participation students pursuing Ph.Ds in the Netherlands, and ended up obtaining 40 of them plus 50 Ph.D. students from elsewhere. The students were distributed across 30 teams including at least one Dutch student per team, and the Dutch students earned educational credits plus "blooper bonus" pay and other incentives.
