= Earth system science =

Scientific study of the Earth's spheres and their natural integrated systems

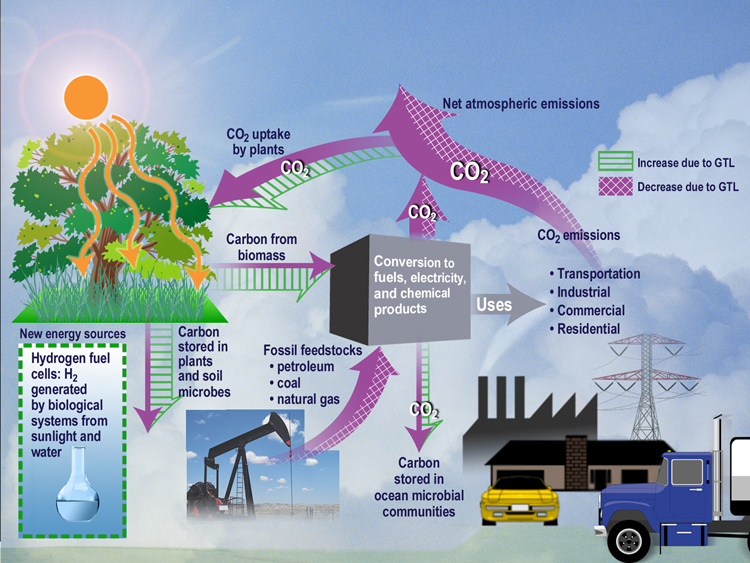
An ecological analysis of CO_{2} in an ecosystem. As systems biology, systems ecology seeks a holistic view of the interactions and transactions within and between biological and ecological systems.

Earth system science (ESS) is the application of systems science to the Earth. In particular, it considers interactions and 'feedbacks', through material and energy fluxes, between the Earth's sub-systems' cycles, processes and "spheres"—atmosphere, hydrosphere, cryosphere, geosphere, pedosphere, lithosphere, biosphere, and even the magnetosphere—as well as the impact of human societies on these components. At its broadest scale, Earth system science brings together researchers across both the natural and social sciences, from fields including ecology, economics, geography, geology, glaciology, meteorology, oceanography, climatology, paleontology, sociology, and space science. Like the broader subject of systems science, Earth system science assumes a holistic view of the dynamic interaction between the Earth's spheres and their many constituent subsystems fluxes and processes, the resulting spatial organization and time evolution of these systems, and their variability, stability and instability. Subsets of Earth System science include systems geology and systems ecology, and many aspects of Earth System science are fundamental to the subjects of physical geography and climate science.

== Definition ==
The Science Education Resource Center, Carleton College, offers the following description: "Earth System science embraces chemistry, physics, biology, mathematics and applied sciences in transcending disciplinary boundaries to treat the Earth as an integrated system. It seeks a deeper understanding of the physical, chemical, biological and human interactions that determine the past, current and future states of the Earth. Earth System science provides a physical basis for understanding the world in which we live and upon which humankind seeks to achieve sustainability".

Earth System science has articulated four overarching, definitive and critically important features of the Earth System, which include:

1. Variability: Many of the Earth System's natural 'modes' and variabilities across space and time are beyond human experience, because of the stability of the recent Holocene. Much Earth System science therefore relies on studies of the Earth's past behaviour and models to anticipate future behaviour in response to pressures.
2. Life: Biological processes play a much stronger role in the functioning and responses of the Earth System than previously thought. It appears to be integral to every part of the Earth System.
3. Connectivity: Processes are connected in ways and across depths and lateral distances that were previously unknown and inconceivable.
4. Non-linear: The behaviour of the Earth System is typified by strong non-linearities. This means that abrupt change can result when relatively small changes in a 'forcing function' push the System across a 'threshold'.

== History ==
For millennia, humans have speculated how the physical and living elements on the surface of the Earth combine, with gods and goddesses frequently posited to embody specific elements. The notion that the Earth, itself, is alive was a regular theme of Greek philosophy and religion.

Early scientific interpretations of the Earth system began in the field of geology, initially in the Middle East and China, and largely focused on aspects such as the age of the Earth and the large-scale processes involved in mountain and ocean formation. As geology developed as a science, understanding of the interplay of different facets of the Earth system increased, leading to the inclusion of factors such as the Earth's interior, planetary geology, living systems and Earth-like worlds.

In many respects, the foundational concepts of Earth System science can be seen in the natural philosophy 19th century geographer Alexander von Humboldt. In the 20th century, Vladimir Vernadsky (1863–1945) saw the functioning of the biosphere as a geological force generating a dynamic disequilibrium, which in turn promoted the diversity of life.

In parallel, the field of systems science was developing across numerous other scientific fields, driven in part by the increasing availability and power of computers, and leading to the development of climate models that began to allow the detailed and interacting simulations of the Earth's weather and climate. Subsequent extension of these models has led to the development of "Earth system models" (ESMs) that include facets such as the cryosphere and the biosphere.

In 1983 a NASA committee called the Earth System Science Committee was formed. The earliest reports of NASA's ESSC, Earth System Science: Overview (1986), and the book-length Earth System Science: A Closer View (1988), constitute a major landmark in the formal development of Earth system science. Early works discussing Earth system science, like these NASA reports, generally emphasized the increasing human impacts on the Earth system as a primary driver for the need of greater integration among the life and geo-sciences, making the origins of Earth system science parallel to the beginnings of global change studies and programs.

== Climate science ==
Climatology and climate change have been central to Earth System science since its inception, as evidenced by the prominent place given to climate change in the early NASA reports discussed above. The Earth's climate system is a prime example of an emergent property of the whole planetary system, that is, one which cannot be fully understood without regarding it as a single integrated entity. It is also a system where human impacts have been growing rapidly in recent decades, lending immense importance to the successful development and advancement of Earth System science research. As just one example of the centrality of climatology to the field, the mission statement of one of the earliest centers for Earth System science research, the Earth System Science Center at Pennsylvania State University, reads, "the Earth System Science Center (ESSC) maintains a mission to describe, model, and understand the Earth's climate system".

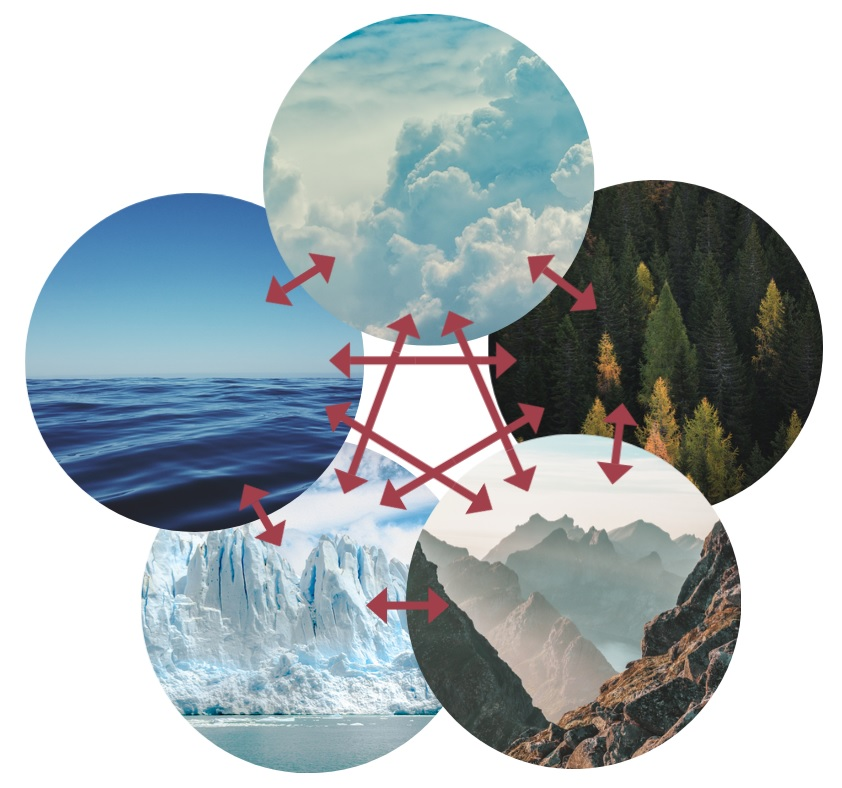
The five components of the climate system all interact. They are the atmosphere, the hydrosphere, the cryosphere, the lithosphere and the biosphere.

Earth's climate system is a complex system with five interacting components: the atmosphere (air), the hydrosphere (water), the cryosphere (ice and permafrost), the lithosphere (earth's upper rocky layer) and the biosphere (living things). Climate is the statistical characterization of the climate system. It represents the average weather, typically over a period of 30 years, and is determined by a combination of processes, such as ocean currents and wind patterns. Circulation in the atmosphere and oceans transports heat from the tropical regions to regions that receive less energy from the Sun. Solar radiation is the main driving force for this circulation. The water cycle also moves energy throughout the climate system. In addition, certain chemical elements are constantly moving between the components of the climate system. Two examples for these biochemical cycles are the carbon and nitrogen cycles.

The climate system can change due to internal variability and external forcings. These external forcings can be natural, such as variations in solar intensity and volcanic eruptions, or caused by humans. Accumulation of greenhouse gases in the atmosphere, mainly being emitted by people burning fossil fuels, is causing climate change. Human activity also releases cooling aerosols, but their net effect is far less than that of greenhouse gases. Changes can be amplified by feedback processes in the different climate system components.

== Education ==
Earth System science can be studied at a postgraduate level at some universities. In general education, the American Geophysical Union, in cooperation with the Keck Geology Consortium and with support from five divisions within the National Science Foundation, convened a workshop in 1996, "to define common educational goals among all disciplines in the Earth sciences". In its report, participants noted that, "The fields that make up the Earth and space sciences are currently undergoing a major advancement that promotes understanding the Earth as a number of interrelated systems". Recognizing the rise of this systems approach, the workshop report recommended that an Earth System science curriculum be developed with support from the National Science Foundation.

In 2000, the Earth System Science Education Alliance (ESSEA) was begun, and currently includes the participation of 40+ institutions, with over 3,000 teachers having completed an ESSEA course as of fall 2009".

== Related concepts ==
The concept of earth system law (still in its infancy as of 2021) is a sub-discipline of earth system governance, itself a subfield of earth system sciences analyzed from a social sciences perspective.

== See also ==
- Earth science – Fields of natural science related to Earth
- Earth system governance – Field of scholarly inquiry in the social sciences
- Earth System Science Partnership – Former global environmental change research partnership
- Earth systems engineering and management
- Ecosphere – Overview of and topical guide to Earth science
- Geosphere – Collective name for the lithosphere, the hydrosphere, the cryosphere, and the atmosphere
- Global change – Planetary-scale changes in the Earth system
- Planetary boundaries – Limits to safe impact on the Earth ecology
- Systems geology – Geology as a set of interacting processes
