= Michele Betsill =

American political scientist

- Education: DePauw University; University of Denver; University of Colorado Boulder
- Scientific career
- Fields: Political science
- Workplaces: Harvard University; Colorado State University

Michele Betsill is an American political scientist. She is a professor of political science at Colorado State University, where she has also been the chair of the department. She studies climate change and sustainability policies, with a particular focus on how non-governmental actors and sub-national governments respond to climate change. She was a co-founder of the Earth System Governance Project in 2009.

== Education and early work ==
Betsill graduated from DePauw University in 1989, with a BA in French and communication. She then obtained an MA in international studies from the University of Denver in 1991.

In 1991, Betsill became a Policy and Government Relations Associate at the African Wildlife Foundation, where she remained for a year. Beginning in 1994, she worked as a research associate in the Environmental and Societal Impacts Group of the National Center for Atmospheric Research in Boulder, Colorado.

In 1997, Betsill received an MA in political science from the University of Colorado Boulder, and in 2000 she earned her PhD in political science there. Betsill's dissertation, called Greens in the Greenhouse: Environmental NGOs, Norms, and the Politics of Global Climate Change, received the 2002 award for an Outstanding Dissertation in Transformational and Ecological Politics from the American Political Science Association.

During the 1999–2000 academic year, Betsill was a post-doctoral fellow at the John F. Kennedy School of Government at Harvard University, and in 2000 she became a professor of political science at Colorado State University. In 2015 she became the chair of that department. Betsill has been a guest or affiliate of Lund University, the Center for Collaborative Conservation, the University of Colorado Boulder, and the National Center for Atmospheric Research.

== Career ==
Betsill has been an author or editor of 6 books. Her first book, Cities and Climate Change: Urban Sustainability and Global Environmental Governance, was coauthored with Harriet Bulkeley and published in 2003. Cities and Climate Change examines the role of cities, and networks of cities, in implementing climate change policies. Betsill and Bulkeley argued that attempts to understand the implementation of climate change policies had been limited by a focus on national governments, but that meaningful policies could also be implemented at the level of city governments or non-governmental organizations, both within and across national borders and potentially without the participation of other levels of government. This is particularly true because of the economic output of cities, and their significant participation in energy use. Focusing on the Cities for Climate Protection program and five case studies of specific cities, Betsill and Bulkeley investigate why it is difficult for networks of cities to implement meaningful sustainability policies in the context of urban planning.

Betsill was also a co-author of the 2014 book Transnational Climate Change Governance, together with the other members of the Leverhulme Network on Transnational Climate Governance. The book empirically investigates attempts to combat climate change that are led by or conducted in collaboration with non-governmental actors, arguing that such efforts are more important and effective than is generally realized. Abby Lindsay Ostovar situated this attempt to "analyze the evolution, constitution, and meaning of the emergent system of cross-border efforts between state and nonstate actors to address climate change" in the context that state-led efforts to combat climate change have not yet been effective, prompting voluntary initiatives to attempt to fill the gap, but with as-yet unknown results.

Betsill was also a co-editor of four books: Palgrave Advances in International Environmental Politics (2006), NGO Diplomacy: The Influence of Nongovernmental Organizations in International Environmental Negotiations (2008), the second edition of Advances in International Environmental Politics (2014), and Agency in Earth System Governance (2020).

In 2008, Betsill co-founded the Earth System Governance Project, which became the world's largest network of environmental political scientists. In 2015, Betsill became the chair of the political science department at Colorado State University.

A 2019 citation analysis by the political scientists Hannah June Kim and Bernard Grofman listed Betsill as one of the most cited political scientists working at an American university in 2 different categories: the top 40 most cited women scholars, and the top 25 most cited political scientists who earned their PhD between 2000 and 2004 (inclusive).

Betsill's work has been cited in media outlets like Mashable, Foreign Affairs, and Times Higher Education.

== Selected work ==
- Cities and Climate Change: Urban Sustainability and Global Environmental Governance, with Harriet Bulkeley (2003)
- "Rethinking sustainable cities: Multilevel governance and the 'urban' politics of climate change", Environmental politics, with Harriet Bulkeley (2005)
- Transnational Climate Change Governance, coauthored with other members of the Leverhulme Network on Transnational Climate Governance (2014)
