= James Meadowcroft =

Canadian sustainability scientist (born 1954)

James R. Meadowcroft (born 15 January 1954) is a Canadian sustainability scientist. He was a reader at the University of Sheffield, before returning to Canada, where held a Tier I Canada Research Chair for fourteen years at Carleton University. At Carleton, Meadowcroft also held a Chancellor's Professorship.

== Education ==
Meadowcroft earned his Bachelor of Arts at McGill University, followed by a DPhil at the University of Oxford.

== Career ==
Meadowcroft has served as chair of the Earth System Governance Project which has a team of two rotating co-chairs since 2019. He is also a member of its scientific steering committee.
