= Global change =

Planetary-scale changes in the Earth system

Global change in broad sense refers to planetary-scale changes in the Earth system. It is most commonly used to encompass the variety of changes connected to the rapid increase in human activities which started around mid-20th century, i.e., the Great Acceleration. While the concept stems from research on the climate change, it is used to adopt a more holistic view of the observed changes. Global change refers to the changes of the Earth system, treated in its entirety with interacting physicochemical and biological components as well as the impact human societies have on the components and vice versa. Therefore, the changes are studied through means of Earth system science.

== History of global-change research ==
The first global efforts to address the environmental impact of human activities on the environment worldwide date before the concept of global change was introduced. Most notably, in 1972 United Nations Conference on the Human Environment was held in Stockholm, which led to United Nations Environment Programme. While the efforts were global and the effects across the globe were considered, the Earth system approach was not yet developed at this time. The events, however, started a chain of events that led to the emergence of the field of global change research.

The concept of global change was coined as researchers investigating climate change stated that not only the climate but also other components of the Earth system change at a rapid pace, which can be attributed to human activities and follow dynamics similar to many societal changes. It has its origins in the World Climate Research Programme, or WCRP, an international program under the leadership of Peter Bolin, which at the time of its establishment in 1980 focused on determining if the climate is changing, can it be predicted and do humans cause the change. The first results not only confirmed human impact but led to the realisation of a larger phenomenon of global change. Subsequently Peter Bolin together with James McCarthy, Paul Crutzen, Hans Oeschger and others started International Geosphere-Biosphere Programme, or IGBP, under the sponsorship of International Council for Science.

In 2001, in Amsterdam, a conference was held focused around the four major global-change research programmes at the time: WCRP, IGBP, International Human Dimensions Programme (IHDP) and Diversitas (now continued as Future Earth). The conference was titled Challenges of a Changing Earth: Global Change Open Science Conference and was concluded with The Amsterdam Declaration on Global Change, best summarized in its first paragraph:

"in addition to the threat of significant climate change, there is growing concern over the ever-increasing human modification of other aspects of the global environment and the consequent implications for human well-being. Basic goods and services supplied by the planetary life support system, such as food, water, clean air, and an environment conducive to human health are being affected increasingly by global change"

== Causes ==
In the past, the main drivers of planetary-scale changes have been solar variation, plate tectonics, volcanism, proliferation and abatement of life, meteorite impact, resource depletion, changes in Earth's orbit around the Sun, and changes in the tilt of Earth on its axis. There is overwhelming evidence that now the main driver of the global change is the growing human population's demand for resources; some experts and scientists have described this phenomenon as the anthropocene epoch. In the last 250 years, human-caused change has accelerated and caused climate change, widespread species extinctions, fish-stock collapse, desertification, ocean acidification, ozone depletion, pollution, and other large-scale shifts. Recent analyses indicate that human-induced warming reached 1.14°C (range: 0.9 to 1.4°C) averaged over the 2013–2022 decade and 1.26°C (range: 1.0 to 1.6°C) in 2022. Over this period, human-induced warming has been increasing at an unprecedented rate of over 0.2°C per decade. This acceleration is attributed to record-high greenhouse gas emissions, averaging 54 ± 5.3 GtCO₂e annually, coupled with a decline in aerosol-induced cooling effects.

Scientists working on the International Geosphere-Biosphere Programme have said that Earth is now operating in a "no analogue" state. Measurements of Earth system processes, past and present, have led to the conclusion that the planet has moved well outside the range of natural variability in the last half million years at least. Homo sapiens have been around for about 300,000 years.

== Physical evidence ==
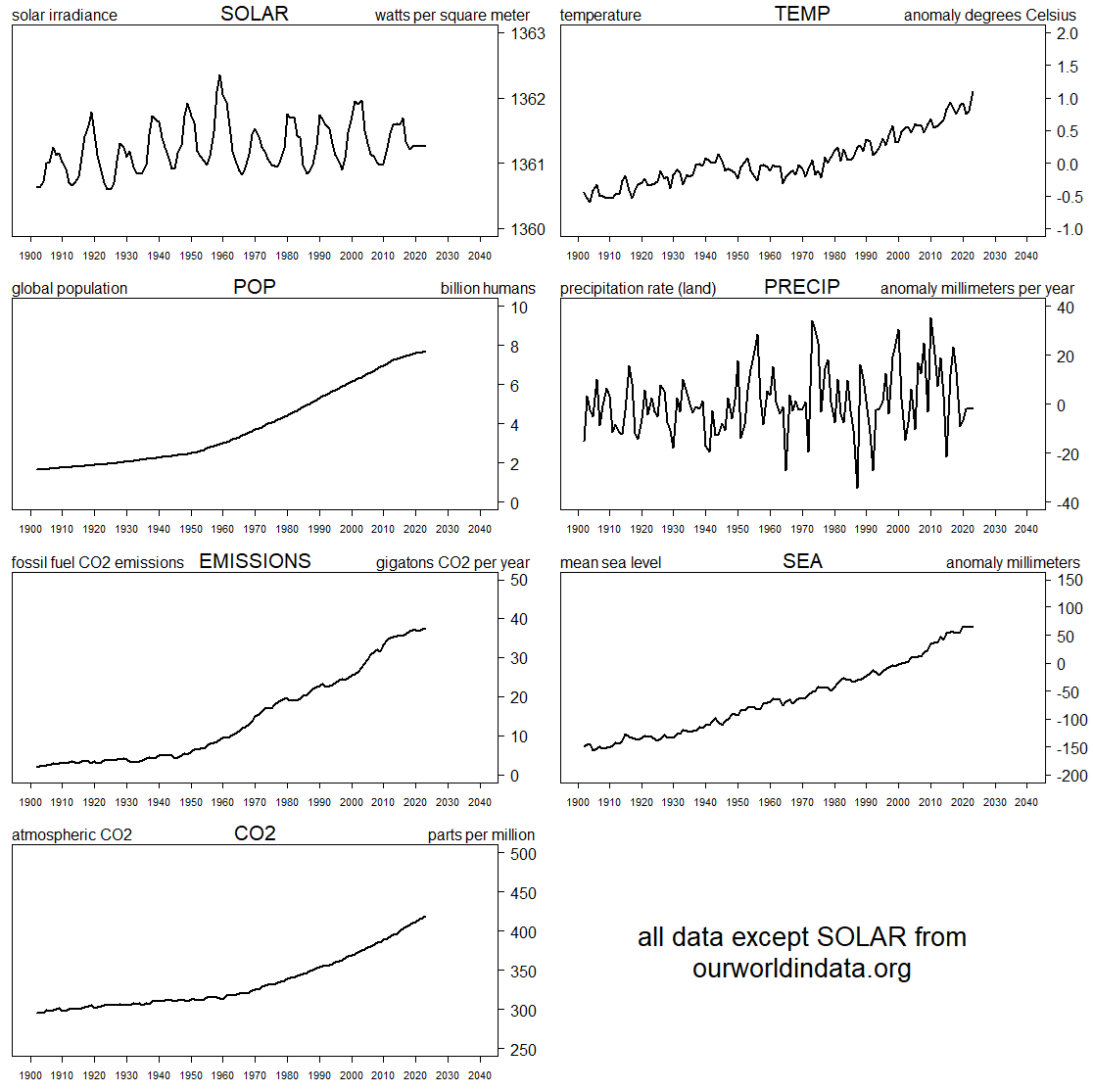
Six global time series from Our World In Data as well as solar irradiance

Humans have always altered their environment. The advent of agriculture around 10,000 years ago led to a radical change in land use that still continues. But, the relatively small human population had little impact on a global scale until the start of the Industrial Revolution in 1750. This event, followed by the invention of the Haber-Bosch process in 1909, which allowed large-scale manufacture of fertilizers, led directly to rapid changes to many of the planet's most important physical, chemical and biological processes.

The 1950s marked a shift in gear: global change began accelerating. Between 1950 and 2010, the population more than doubled. In that time, rapid expansion of international trade coupled with upsurges in capital flows and new technologies, particularly information and communication technologies, led to national economies becoming more fully integrated. There was a tenfold increase in economic activity and the world's human population became more tightly connected than ever before. The period saw sixfold increases in water use and river damming. About 70 percent of the world's freshwater resource is now used for agriculture. This rises to 90 percent in India and China. Half of the Earth's land surface had now been domesticated. By 2010, urban population, for the first time, exceeded rural population. And there has been a fivefold increase in fertilizer use. Indeed, manufactured reactive nitrogen from fertilizer production and industry now exceeds global terrestrial production of reactive nitrogen. Without artificial fertilizers there would not be enough food to sustain a population of seven billion people.

These changes to the human sub-system have a direct influence on all components of the Earth system. The chemical composition of the atmosphere has changed significantly. Concentrations of important greenhouse gases, carbon dioxide, methane and nitrous oxide are rising fast. Over Antarctica a large hole in the ozone layer appeared. Fisheries collapsed: most of the world's fisheries are now fully or over-exploited. Thirty percent of tropical rainforests disappeared.

In 2000, Nobel prize-winning scientist Paul Crutzen announced the scale of change is so great that in just 250 years, human society has pushed the planet into a new geological era: the Anthropocene. This name has stuck and there are calls for the Anthropocene to be adopted officially. If it is, it may be the shortest of all geological eras.

== Society ==
Global change in a societal context encompasses social, cultural, technological, political, economic and legal change. Terms closely related to global change and society are globalization and global integration. Globalization began with long-distance trade and urbanism. The first record of long distance trading routes is in the third millennium BC. Sumerians in Mesopotamia traded with settlers in the Indus Valley, in modern-day India.

Since 1750, but more significantly, since the 1950s, global integration has accelerated. This era has witnessed global changes in communications, transportation, and computer technology. Ideas, cultures, people, goods, services and money move around the planet with ease. This new global interconnectedness and free flow of information has radically altered notions of other cultures, conflicts, religions and taboos. Now, social movements can and do form at a planetary scale.

Evidence, if more were needed, of the link between social and environmental global change came with the 2008 financial crisis. The crisis pushed the planet's main economic powerhouses, the United States, Europe and much of Asia into the Great Recession. According to the Global Carbon Project, global atmospheric emissions of carbon dioxide fell from an annual growth rate of around 3.4% between 2000 and 2008, to a growth rate of about 2% in 2008.

Societies everywhere are facing unprecedented challenges as a result of rapid global change (including climate change). In such a context there is need for generatively contributing to transformative social learning systems and green skills learning pathways development. Through this focus, the Chair's work contributes enhancing capacity for climate resilient development and a sustainable, socially just society in South Africa and Africa more widely.

== Planetary management ==
Humans are altering the planet's biogeochemical cycles in a largely unregulated way with limited knowledge of the consequences. Without steps to effectively manage the Earth system – the planet's physical, chemical, biological and social components – it is likely there will be severe impacts on people and ecosystems. Perhaps the largest concern is that a component of the Earth system, for example, an ocean circulation, the Amazon rainforest, or Arctic sea ice, will reach a tipping point and flip from its current state to another state: flowing to not flowing, rainforest to savanna, or ice to no ice. A domino effect could ensue with other components of the Earth system changing state rapidly.

Intensive research over the last 20 years has shown that tipping points do exist in the Earth system, and wide-scale change can be rapid – a matter of decades. Potential tipping points have been identified and attempts have been made to quantify thresholds. But to date, the best efforts can only identify loosely defined "planetary boundaries" beyond which tipping points exist but their precise locations remain elusive.

There have been calls for a better way to manage the environment on a planetary scale, sometimes referred to as managing "Earth's life support system". The United Nations was formed to stop wars and provide a platform for dialogue between countries. It was not created to avoid major environmental catastrophe on regional or global scales. But several international environmental conventions exist under the UN, including the Framework Convention on Climate Change, Montreal Protocol, Convention to Combat Desertification, and Convention on Biological Diversity. Additionally, the UN has two bodies charged with coordinating environmental and development activities, the United Nations Environment Programme (UNEP) and the United Nations Development Programme (UNDP).

In 2004, the IGBP published "Global Change and the Earth System, a planet under pressure." The publication's executive summary concluded: "An overall, comprehensive, internally consistent strategy for stewardship of the Earth system is required". It stated that a research goal is to define and maintain a stable equilibrium in the global environment.

In 2007, France called for UNEP to be replaced by a new and more powerful organization called the "United Nations Environment Organization". The rationale was that UNEP's status as a "programme", rather than an "organization" in the tradition of the World Health Organization or the World Meteorological Organization, weakened it to the extent that it was no longer fit for purpose given current knowledge of the state of the planet.

== See also ==
- Climate change
- Earth system science
- Sustainability
