= Systems geology =

Geology as a set of interacting processes

Systems geology emphasizes the nature of geology as a system – that is, as a set of interacting parts that function as a whole. The systems approach involves study of the linkages or interfaces between the component objects and processes at all levels of detail in order to gain a more comprehensive understanding of the solid Earth. A long-term objective is to provide computational support throughout the cycles of investigation, integrating observation and experiment with modeling and theory, each reinforcing the other. The overall complexity suggests that systems geology must be based on the wider emerging cyberinfrastructure, and should aim to harmonize geological information with Earth system science within the context of the e-science vision of a comprehensive global knowledge system (see Linked Data, Semantic Web).

== Background ==
Systems geology can be seen as an integral part of the science of earth systems, "encompassing all components of the Earth system – air, life, rock and water – to gain a new and more comprehensive understanding of the world as we know it". Much of the background was set out in Solid-Earth Science and Society in 1993. Since then, considerable progress has resulted from large investments in geoinformatics by the US National Science Foundation and the European Commission, much of it implemented on their high-level computing networks. The concepts of Earth Systems are reflected in the teaching of geology. Nevertheless, geology has unique aspects that justify consideration of systems geology as a distinct subsystem. These include the availability of detailed world-wide geological mapping and stratigraphical classification, and the rapidly growing understanding of Earth history in terms of past configurations of geological objects and processes.

== Related initiatives ==
Cornell University's Geoscience Information System Project started in 1995. 'Building the Digital Earth' aims to develop a comprehensive geoscience information system, which they see as one of the most important steps that geoscientists could undertake in response to new technological advancements. Their ambition is to place all information and knowledge, along with access, modeling, and visualization tools, 'under the finger tips of a user'. This objective is echoed in Keller and Baru (2011) where the Earth is considered as a single system (pages 3, 12, 15, 37), and progress is recorded in moving towards the geoinformatics vision set out in 2007: to facilitate 'a future in which someone can sit at a terminal and have easy access to vast stores of data of almost any kind, with the easy ability to visualize, analyze and model those data.' (p15). Because the treatment of earth systems and geology has repercussions in other fields, there is a need for them to share a wider-ranging cyberinfrastructure (p3, chapters 3, 4).

== Wider context ==
The systems approach is being actively developed in many other areas, such as biology and medicine (EuroPhysiome) opening the prospect of widely shared concepts, structures and implementations. Geospatial cyberinfrastructure applications, which seem particularly relevant to communicating information from geologists to end-users, are discussed by Yang et al., 2010.

== Conclusions ==
The systems approach may be particularly relevant to geological surveys, which are typically state, national or federal institutions that maintain and advance knowledge of geosciences. Traditionally, they have focused on the systematic production of geological maps, reports and archives of records and specimens. In the long run, geoinformatics could support integration at a systems level of geological surveys activities world-wide, all contributing to, using, testing and extending a shared cloud-based model. The British Geological Survey website tentatively suggests some possible developments in systems geology and the consequences for future geological mapping. It makes available A Scenario for Systems Geology which brings together relevant material from many sources to suggest how a comprehensive approach to systems geology might evolve. The scenario is not a statement of intent or a proposal for implementation, but an account of some possibilities that can be considered, discussed, criticized and improved. The ideas of systems geology will contribute to the future framework for studying geology in its wider context, but exploration of its full potential is still at an early stage.

== See also ==
- Cyberinfrastructure
- Earth System Science Partnership
- International Geosphere-Biosphere Programme
- GeoSciML
