= Chukwumerije Okereke =

Nigerian professor

Chukwumerije Okereke is a Nigerian professor of Global Governance and Public Policy at Bristol University's School for Policy Studies and serves as the director of the Centre for Climate Change and Development at Alex Ekwueme Federal University Ndufu Alike Ikwo (AE-FUNAI) Ebonyi State.

Prior to his work at Alex Ekwueme Federal University, Okereke was also a professor of Environment and Development at the University of Reading, where he served as the co-director at the Centre for Climate and Justice as well as the Leverhulme Climate Justice Doctoral Scholarship Programme.

== Works and recognition ==
Okereke is part of the United Nations's Intergovernmental Panel on Climate Change (IPCC) as the coordinating lead author on the Introduction and Framing chapter. He is the author of Global Justice and Neoliberal Environmental Governance (2008) and edited The Politics of the Environment (2007). He co-edited Global Carbon Governance and Business Transformation with A. Bumpus, J. Tansey, H. Blaz in 2015. In 2023, Okereke was elected as a fellow of World Academy of Sciences.

Okereke served on the scientific steering committee of the Earth System Governance Project since 2022 until at least 2024. He is also on the committee of its South-South Initiative.
