= International Geosphere-Biosphere Programme =

Research programme

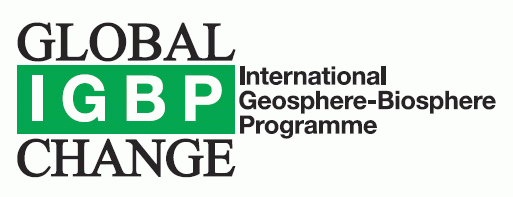
- IGBP
- Abbreviation: IGBP
- Formation: 1987; 39 years ago
- Type: INGO
- Region served: Worldwide
- Official language: English
- Parent organization: International Council for Science (ICSU)
- Website: www.igbp.net

The International Geosphere-Biosphere Programme (IGBP) was a research programme that ran from 1987 to 2015 dedicated to studying the phenomenon of global change. Its primary focus was coordinating "international research on global-scale and regional-scale interactions between Earth's biological, chemical and physical processes and their interactions with human systems."

The International Council of Scientific Unions, a coordinating body of national science organizations, launched IGBP. It looked at the total Earth system, the changes that are occurring, and the manner in which changes are influenced by human actions.

IGBP aimed to describe and understand how the physical, chemical and biological processes regulate the Earth system. It also sought to increase knowledge of how humans are influencing global processes, such as the carbon cycle, nitrogen cycle, sulfur cycle, water cycle and phosphorus cycle. "It delivers scientific knowledge to help human societies develop in harmony with Earth's environment."

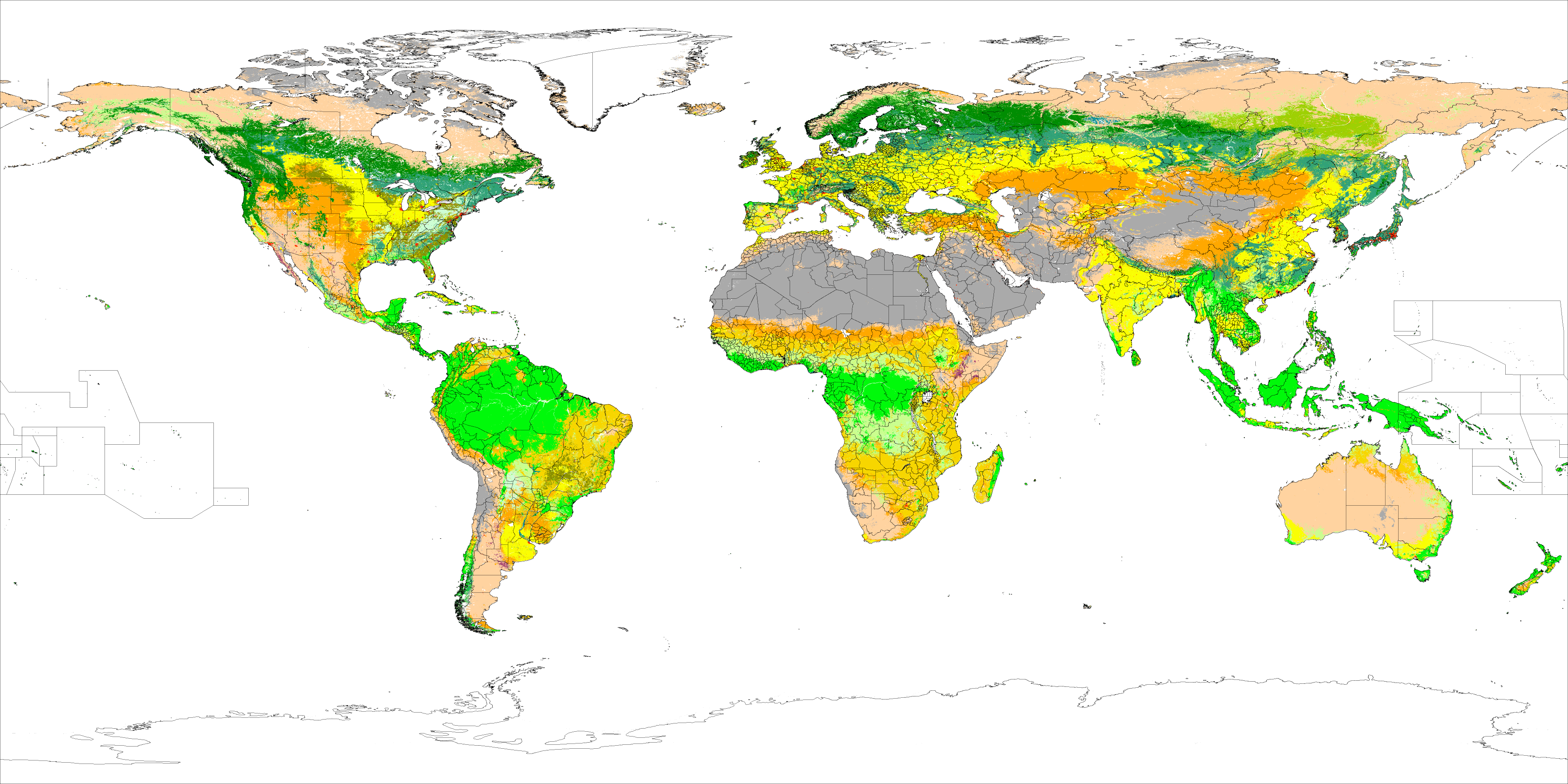
The 17 global land cover classes of the International Geosphere-Biosphere Programme, "which includes 11 natural vegetation classes, 3 developed and mosaicked land classes, and 3 non-vegetated land classes", as detected by satellites. Water Evergreen Needleleaf forest Evergreen Broadleaf forest Deciduous Needleleaf Forest Deciduous Broadleaf Forest Mixed Forest Closed Shrubland Open Shrubland Woody Savannas Savannas Grasslands Permanent Wetlands Croplands Urban and Built-Up Cropland/Natural Vegetation Mosaic Snow and Ice Barren or Sparsely Vegetated

IGBP research was organised around six projects representing the Earth system – land, atmosphere, ocean and where they meet (land-atmosphere, land-ocean, atmosphere-ocean) and two further projects looking at the Earth system as a whole: Past Global Changes (PAGES), which looks at palaeoclimate, and the Analysis, Integration and Modelling of the Earth System (AIMES), which helps set the agenda for Earth system models, as well as four joint projects – carbon, water, human health and food security – with the other three international global-change programmes.

In 2004, IGBP published a landmark synthesis, Global Change and the Earth System: A Planet Under Pressure (Steffen et al). The synthesis stated that humanity was now the main driver of change at the planetary scale and that Earth is now operating in a "no analogue" state. Measurements of Earth system processes, past and present, have led to the conclusion that the planet has moved well outside the range of natural variability in the last half million years at least.

From 2008 to 2015, Sybil Seitzinger was executive director of the IGBP.

== IGBP projects ==
- Analysis, Integration and Modeling of the Earth System (AIMES)
- Global Ocean Ecosystem Dynamics (GLOBEC)
- Global Land Project (GLP)
- International Global Atmospheric Chemistry (IGAC)
- Integrated Land Ecosystem–Atmosphere Processes Study (iLEAPS)
- Integrated Marine Biogeochemistry and Ecosystem Research (IMBER)
- Land-Ocean Interaction in the Coastal Zone (LOICZ)
- Past Global Changes (PAGES)
- Surface Ocean Lower Atmosphere Study (SOLAS)
- Integrated History and Future of People on Earth (IHOPE)

== IGBP joint projects ==
- Global Carbon Project
- Global Land Project
- Global Environmental Change and Human Health (GECHH)
- Global Environmental Change and Food Systems (GECAFS)
- Global Water System Project (GWSP)
- International Nitrogen Initiative

== International partners ==
- Earth System Science Partnership
- World Climate Research Programme
- Diversitas
- International Human Dimensions Programme

== See also ==
- Systems geology
