= Geosphere =

Collective name for the lithosphere, the hydrosphere, the cryosphere, and the atmosphere

There are several conflicting usages of geosphere, variously defined.

== History ==
=== Aristotelian physics ===
In Aristotelian physics, the term was applied to four spherical natural places, concentrically nested around the center of the Earth, as described in the lectures Physica and Meteorologica. They were believed to explain the motions of the four terrestrial elements: Earth, Water, Air, and Fire.

=== Modern era ===
In modern texts and in Earth system science, geosphere refers to the solid parts of the Earth; it is used along with atmosphere, hydrosphere, and biosphere to describe the systems of the Earth (the interaction of these systems with the magnetosphere is sometimes listed). In that context, sometimes the term lithosphere is used instead of geosphere or solid Earth. The lithosphere, however, only refers to the uppermost layers of the solid Earth (oceanic and continental crustal rocks and uppermost mantle).

== Other usages ==
"Geosphere" may also be taken as the collective name for the lithosphere, the hydrosphere, the cryosphere, and the atmosphere. The different collectives of the geosphere are able to exchange different mass and/or energy fluxes (the measurable amount of change). The exchange of these fluxes affects the balance of the different spheres of the geosphere. An example is how the soil acts as a part of the biosphere, while also acting as a source of flux exchange.

=== Space exploration ===
Since space exploration began, it has been observed that the extent of the ionosphere or plasmasphere is highly variable, and often much larger than previously appreciated, at times extending to the boundaries of the Earth's magnetosphere. This highly variable outer boundary of geogenic matter has been referred to as the "geopause" (or magnetopause), to suggest the relative scarcity of such matter beyond it, where the solar wind dominates.

== See also ==
- Figure of the Earth – Size and shape used to model the Earth for geodesy
- Geosphere Environmental Ltd - Environmental Consultancy based in the UK.
