= Stockholm Memorandum =

2011 letter on climate change

The Stockholm Memorandum is a document signed in May 2011 by many Nobel Laureates based on the verdict from the trial of humanity, which opened the 3rd Nobel Laureate Symposium. The jury of Nobel laureates concluded that Earth has entered a new geological age, which it calls the Anthropocene, in which humans are the most significant driver of global climate change, and in which human collective actions could have abrupt and irreversible consequences for human communities and ecological systems. The memorandum was signed by 20 winners of the Nobel Prize or the Sveriges Riksbank Prize for Economic Sciences in Memory of Alfred Nobel (six in Chemistry, five in Physics, three in Physiology or Medicine, one in Literature, one Peace Prize winner and four in Economic Sciences) was submitted to the United Nations High Level Panel on global sustainability.

"We are the first generation with the insight of the new global risks facing humanity, that people and societies are the biggest drivers of global change. The basic analysis is not in question: we cannot continue on our current path and need to take action quickly. Science can guide us in identifying the pathway to global sustainability, provided that it also engages in an open dialogue with society," says Professor Mario Molina, who acted as judge and received the Nobel Prize in Chemistry in 1995.

== Conclusions ==
Key conclusion of the Stockholm Memorandum include:

- that environmental sustainability is a precondition for poverty eradication, economic development, and social justice;
- that achieving the Millennium Development Goals is a top priority, since almost a third of the world scrapes by on less than $2 per day;
- that the Gross Domestic Product (GDP) is insufficient as an economic indicator and that, therefore, new human welfare indicators must be developed;
- that global warming must be kept below 2 degrees Celsius, which, in turn, requires a global carbon dioxide emissions peak no later than 2015;
- that a new agricultural revolution must be fostered so as to produce more food in a sustainable way on agricultural land currently used.
