= Earth System Science Partnership =

Former global environmental change research partnership

Earth System Science Partnership (ESSP) was an international interdisciplinary partnership established to promote integrated study of the Earth system and the interactions between environmental and human processes. The partnership brought together four major global change programmes: DIVERSITAS, the International Geosphere-Biosphere Programme (IGBP), the World Climate Research Programme (WCRP), and the International Human Dimensions Programme (IHDP).

== Purpose and scope ==
ESSP aimed to transcend disciplinary boundaries by integrating natural sciences and social sciences to improve understanding and prediction of global and regional environmental change, and to inform sustainable responses. Its strategy emphasised systems-level observations, interdisciplinary modelling, regional studies, and engagement with stakeholders and policy communities.

== Joint projects and activities ==
ESSP coordinated a small set of interdisciplinary “Joint Projects” addressing societally relevant themes: carbon (through the Global Carbon Project), food systems (GECAFS), water systems (GWSP), and global environmental change and human health (GEC&HH). These projects combined existing scientific networks, regional studies (for example the Monsoon Asia Integrated Regional Study, MAIRS), and capacity-building activities to link local-regional research with global synthesis.

== Governance and review ==
ESSP operated as a partnership among the sponsoring programmes with coordination provided through a scientific committee and Secretariat functions, and it was periodically reviewed by ICSU and partner funding bodies to assess progress, governance and policy relevance.

== Transition and legacy ==
Following an independent review and planning processes, ESSP underwent a phased transition into the initiative known as Future Earth which formally began to absorb and reconfigure ESSP activities from 2012 onwards; this shift sought a broader sustainability focus and new modes of co-design between science and society. ESSP’s principal legacy is the operational model of interdisciplinary joint projects and regional synthesis, which informed successor efforts and many active research networks.

== See also ==
- Earth system science
- International Geosphere-Biosphere Programme
- Systems geology
