= International Council for Science =

International non-governmental organisation

- Abbreviation: ICSU
- Merged into: International Social Science Council
- Successor: International Science Council
- Formation: 1931; 95 years ago
- Dissolved: July 2018; 7 years ago
- Type: INGO
- Headquarters: Paris, France
- President: Gordon McBean
- Website: council.science
- Formerly called: International Council of Scientific Unions

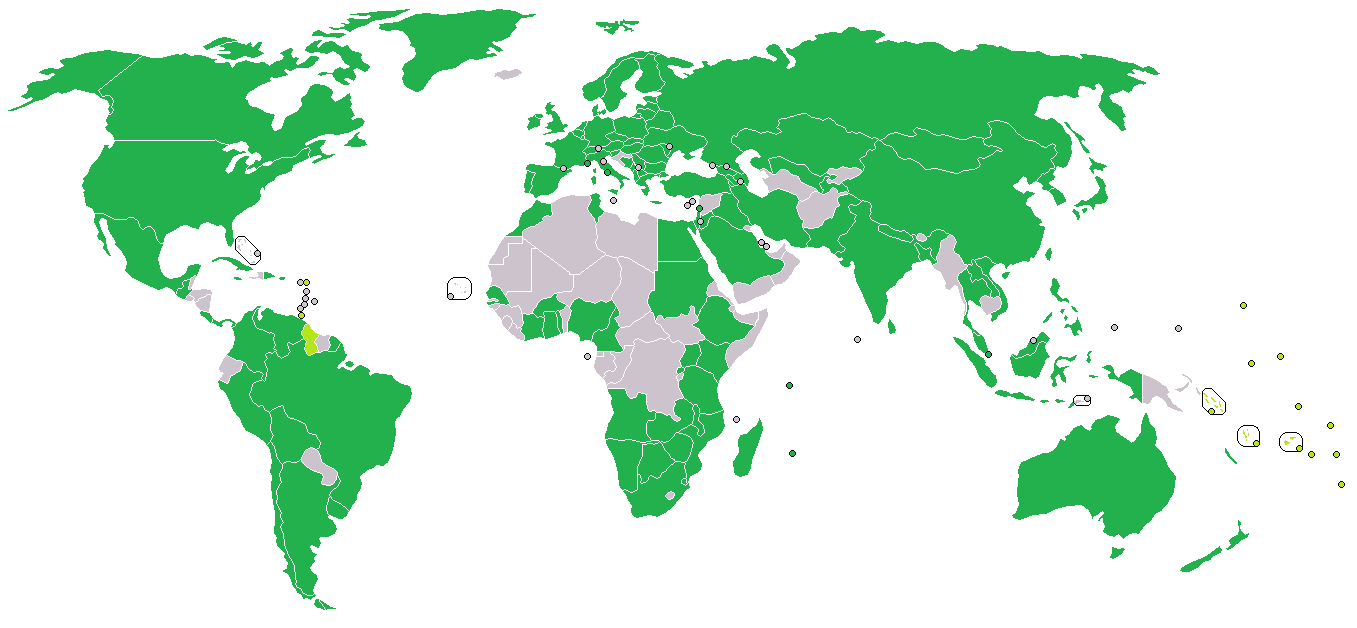
Members Members as participants in the Caribbean Academy of Sciences or University of the South Pacific

The International Council for Science (ICSU, after its former name, International Council of Scientific Unions) was an international non-governmental organization devoted to international cooperation in the advancement of science. Its members were national scientific bodies and international scientific unions.

In 2017, the ICSU comprised 122 multi-disciplinary National Scientific Members, Associates and Observers representing 142 countries and 31 international, disciplinary Scientific Unions. ICSU also had 22 Scientific Associates. In July 2018, ICSU merged with the International Social Science Council (ISSC) to form the International Science Council (ISC) at a constituent general assembly in Paris.

== Mission and principles ==
The ICSU's mission was to strengthen international science for the benefit of society. To do this, the ICSU mobilized the knowledge and resources of the international scientific community to:

- Identify and address major issues of importance to science and society.
- Facilitate interaction amongst scientists across all disciplines and from all countries.
- Promote the participation of all scientists – regardless of race, citizenship, language, political stance, or gender – in the international scientific endeavour.
- Provide independent, authoritative advice to stimulate constructive dialogue between the scientific community and governments, civil society, and the private sector."

Activities focused on three areas: International Research Collaboration, Science for Policy, and Universality of Science.

== History ==
In July 2018, the ICSU became the International Science Council (ISC).

The ICSU itself was one of the oldest non-governmental organizations in the world, representing the evolution and expansion of two earlier bodies known as the International Association of Academies (IAA; 1899–1914) and the International Research Council (IRC; 1919–1931). In 1998, Members agreed that the Council's current composition and activities would be better reflected by modifying the name from the International Council of Scientific Unions to the International Council for Science, while its rich history and strong identity would be well served by retaining the existing acronym, ICSU.

== Universality of science ==
The Principle of Freedom and Responsibility in Science: the free and responsible practice of science is fundamental to scientific advancement and human and environmental well-being. Such practice, in all its aspects, requires freedom of movement, association, expression and communication for scientists, as well as equitable access to data, information, and other resources for research. It requires responsibility at all levels to carry out and communicate scientific work with integrity, respect, fairness, trustworthiness, and transparency, recognizing its benefits and possible harms. In advocating the free and responsible practice of science, the council promotes equitable opportunities for access to science and its benefits, and opposes discrimination based on such factors as ethnic origin, religion, citizenship, language, political or other opinion, sex, gender identity, sexual orientation, disability, or age.

The International Science Council's Committee on Freedom and Responsibility in Science (CFRS) "oversees this commitment and is the guardian of this work."

== Structure ==
The ICSU Secretariat (20 staff in 2012) in Paris ensured the day-to-day planning and operations under the guidance of an elected executive board. Three Policy Committees − Committee on Scientific Planning and Review (CSPR), Committee on Freedom and Responsibility in the conduct of Science (CFRS) and Committee on Finance − assisted the executive board in its work and a General Assembly of all Members was convened every three years. ICSU has three Regional Offices − Africa, Asia and the Pacific as well as Latin America and the Caribbean.

== Finances ==
The principal source of ICSU's finances was the contributions it receives from its members. Other sources of income are the framework contracts from UNESCO (United Nations Educational, Scientific and Cultural Organization) and grants and contracts from United Nations bodies, foundations and agencies, which are used to support the scientific activities of the ICSU Unions and interdisciplinary bodies.

== Member organizations ==
Abbreviation	Union	Member Since	Field
IAU	International Astronomical Union	1922	Astronomy
IBRO	International Brain Research Organization	1993	Neuroscience
ICA	International Cartographic Association	1990	Cartography
IGU	International Geographical Union	1923	Geography
IMU	International Mathematical Union	1922	Mathematics
INQUA	International Union for Quaternary Research	2005	Quaternary Period
ISA	International Sociological Association	2011	Sociology and Social Sciences
ISPRS	International Society for Photogrammetry and Remote Sensing	2002	Photogrammetry and Remote Sensing
IUAES	International Union of Anthropological and Ethnological Sciences	1993	Anthropology and Ethnology
IUBMB	International Union of Biochemistry and Molecular Biology	1955	Biochemistry and Molecular Biology
IUBS	International Union of Biological Sciences	1925	Biology
IUCr	International Union of Crystallography	1947	Crystallography
IUFRO	International Union of Forest Research Organizations	2005	Forestry
IUFoST	International Union of Food Science and Technology	1996	Food science and Food technology
IUGG	International Union of Geodesy and Geophysics	1919	Geodesy and Geophysics
IUGS	International Union of Geological Sciences	1922	Geology
IUHPS	International Union of History and Philosophy of Science	1922	History of science and Philosophy of science
IUIS	International Union of Immunological Societies	1976	Immunology
IUMRS	International Union of Materials Research Societies	2005	Materials science
IUMS	International Union of Microbiological Societies	1982	Microbiology
IUNS	International Union of Nutritional Sciences	1968	Nutrition
IUPAB	International Union for Pure and Applied Biophysics	1966	Biophysics
IUPAC	International Union of Pure and Applied Chemistry	1922	Chemistry
IUPAP	International Union of Pure and Applied Physics	1922	Physics
IUPESM	International Union for Physical and Engineering Sciences in Medicine	1999	Medical physics
IUPHAR	International Union of Basic and Clinical Pharmacology	1972	Pharmacology
IUPS	International Union of Physiological Sciences	1955	Physiology
IUPsyS	International Union of Psychological Science	1982	Psychology
IUSS	International Union of Soil Sciences	1993	Soil science
IUTAM	International Union of Theoretical and Applied Mechanics	1947	Mechanics
IUTOX	International Union of Toxicology	1996	Toxicology
URSI	International Union of Radio Science	1922	Radio science

=== Associate member organizations ===
Abbr.	Associate
4S	Society for Social Studies of Science
AAS	African Academy of Sciences
AASSA	Association of Academies and Societies of Sciences in Asia
ACAL	Latin American Academy of Sciences
CIE	Commission Internationale de l'Eclairage
FIG	Fédération internationale des géomètres
IAHR	International Association for Hydro-Environment Engineering and Research
IASC	International Arctic Science Committee
ICA (acoustics)	International Commission for Acoustics
ICIAM	International Council for Industrial and Applied Mathematics
ICLAS	International Council for Laboratory Animal Science
ICO	International Commission for Optics
ICSTI	International Council for Scientific and Technical Information
IFIP	International Federation for Information Processing
IFLA	International Federation of Library Associations and Institutions
IFS	International Foundation for Science
IFSM	International Federation of Societies for Microscopy
IIASA	International Institute for Applied Systems Analysis
IUVSTA	International Union for Vacuum Science, Technique and Applications
IWA	International Water Association
PSA	Pacific Science Association
SCOPE	Scientific Committee on Problems of the Environment
TWAS	The World Academy of Sciences
UIS	Union Internationale de Spéléologie

== See also ==
- Diversitas project, closed Dec 2014 transferred Jan 2015 to ICS as Future Earth
- InterAcademy Partnership

Abbr.	Organisation
CIAAW	Commission on Isotopic Abundances and Atomic Weights
CODATA	Committee on Data for Science and Technology
COSPAR	Committee on Space Research
GCOS	Global Climate Observing System
IGBP	International Geosphere-Biosphere Programme
IHDP	International Human Dimensions Programme
SCAR	Scientific Committee on Antarctic Research
SCOPE	Scientific Committee on Problems of the Environment
SCOR	Scientific Committee on Oceanic Research
INASP	International Network for Advancing Science and Policy
WCRP	World Climate Research Programme
WDS	World Data System

== Bibliography ==
- Greenaway, Frank (2006) Science International: A History of the International Council of Scientific Unions Cambridge University Press ISBN 9780521028103
- Frängsmyr, Tore (1990) Solomon's house revisited: the organization and institutionalization of science. Science History Publications, U.S.A. ISBN 9780881350661
- Crawford, Elisabeth (2002) Nationalism and Internationalism in Science, 1880-1939. Cambridge University Press ISBN 9780521524742
