= International Human Dimensions Programme =

Research programme studying global change

- Abbreviation: IHDP
- Formation: 1990
- Dissolved: 2014
- Type: INGO
- Legal status: Dissolved
- Region served: Worldwide
- Official language: English
- Parent organization: International Social Science Council (ISSC)
- Website: IHDP Official website

The International Human Dimensions Programme on Global Environmental Change (IHDP) was a research programme that studied the human and societal aspects of the phenomenon of global change.

IHDP aimed to frame, develop and integrate social science research on global change, and promote the application of its key findings. It strived to develop research approaches that put societies at the center of the debate, looking at then-current global environmental problems as social and societal challenges.

IHDP's work brought together groups of multi-disciplinary and multi-national researchers to work on long-term collaborative science. Its former role within the scientific field provided leadership in the selection and development of themes for focused research and in stimulating scientific communities to coordinate their efforts on these themes within the framework of its projects.

IHDP research was conducted through ten projects. Its six core projects, focused on how humans affect and are affected by climate change, with specific topics including human security, urbanization, industrial transformation and environmental governance as they relate to global change. Two of its six core projects were also core projects of the International Geosphere-Biosphere Programme (IGBP) and focused specifically on coupled human-environment systems such as land use, and coastal zones. It also had four joint projects on the Earth's carbon cycle, water systems, human health and food systems with the other three global change research programmes (ESSP).

== History ==
IHDP was initiated as the Human Dimensions Programme (HDP) in 1990 by the International Social Science Council (ISSC). It was established under its closing name International Human Dimensions Programme on Global Environmental Change by ISSC and International Council for Science (ICSU) in 1996. In 2006, the United Nations University joined ISSC and ICSU as an institutional sponsor of IHDP. The organization closed its doors in July 2014.

A large part of the research agenda of the former International Human Dimensions Programme has been carried forward by the Earth System Governance Project.

== Secretariat ==
The IHDP Secretariat was located at the United Nations Campus in Bonn, Germany, and was hosted by the United Nations University.

== Earth System Science Partnership (ESSP) ==
IHDP was a partner of the Earth System Science Partnership along with the International Geosphere-Biosphere Programme, the World Climate Research Programme, and DIVERSITAS an international programme for biodiversity research.

== Projects ==
- Global Environmental Change and Human Security (GECHS)
- Urbanization and Global Environmental Change Project (UGEC)
- Industrial Transformation (IHDP-IT)
- Integrated Risk Governance Project (IRG-P)
- Earth System Governance Project (ESG)
- Land-Ocean Interactions in the Coastal Zone (LOICZ)
- Global Land Project (GLP)
- Global Carbon Project (GCP)
- Global Water Systems Projects (GWSP)
- Global Environmental Change and Human Health (GECHH)
- Global Environmental Change and Food Systems (GECAFS)
