= IHE Delft Institute for Water Education =

Institute for water education in The Netherlands

Coordinates: 52°00′31″N 4°21′25″E

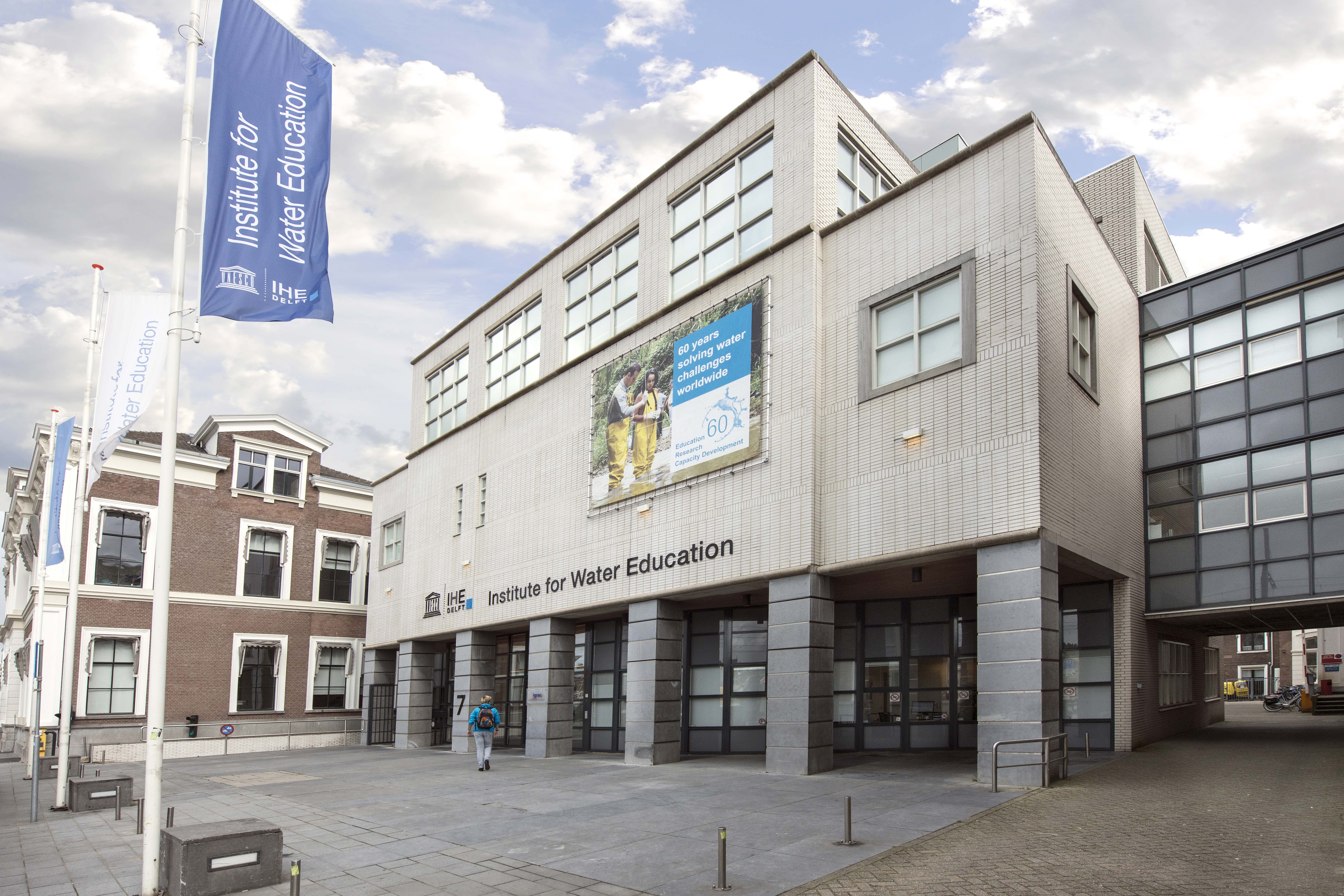
Facade IHE Delft Institute for Water Education in Delft

IHE Delft Institute for Water Education is the largest international graduate water education facility in the world and is based in Delft, Netherlands. IHE Delft cooperates with the city of Delft and water related institutes based in Delft. The Institute confers fully accredited MSc degrees, and PhD degrees together with partners in the Netherlands. Since 1957 the Institute has provided graduate education to more than 23,000 water professionals from over 190 countries, and is a flagship institute in the UN-Water family.

IHE Delft is a partner institute of the National SENSE Research School. As an accredited institution, staff and students are expected to follow the Netherlands Code of Conduct for Scientific Practice.

The institute was established from the International Course in Hydraulic Engineering (set up in 1957). This name changed to International Institute for Hydraulic and Environmental Engineering (IHE) in 1976. In 2003, the Institute changed its name to UNESCO-IHE Institute for Water Education (UNESCO-IHE). The name was changed again in 2017, this time to IHE Delft Institute for Water Education (IHE Delft) when its status in relation to UNESCO changed. It is now a Category 2 institute, operating under the auspices of UNESCO.
