= Global Carbon Project =

Global research project on greenhouse gas emissions

- Abbreviation: GCP
- Formation: 2001
- Purpose: Measuring and reducing greenhouse gas emissions
- Chair: Rob Jackson, Stanford University
- Website: globalcarbonproject.org

GCP's Global Carbon Budget 2021 presented research (Friedlingstein et al. 2021) showing cumulative contributions to the global carbon budget since 1850 to illustrate how carbon source and sink components have been out of balance, causing an approximately 50% rise in atmospheric carbon dioxide concentration

The Global Carbon Project (GCP) is an organisation that seeks to quantify global greenhouse gas emissions and their causes. Established in 2001, its projects include global budgets for three dominant greenhouse gases—carbon dioxide (CO_{2}), methane (CH_{4}), and nitrous oxide (N_{2}O)—and complementary efforts in urban, regional, cumulative, and negative emissions.

The main object of the group has been to fully understand the carbon cycle. The project has brought together emissions experts, earth scientists, and economists to tackle the problem of rising concentrations of greenhouse gases. In 2020, the project released its newest Global Methane Budget and first Global Nitrous Oxide Budget, the two anthropogenic trace gases most dominant for warming after carbon dioxide.

The Global Carbon Project collaborates with many groups to gather, analyze, and publish data on greenhouse gas emissions in an open and transparent fashion, making datasets available on its website and through its publications. It was founded as a partnership among the International Geosphere-Biosphere Programme, the World Climate Programme, the International Human Dimensions Programme and Diversitas, under the umbrella of the Earth System Science Partnership. Many core projects in this partnership subsequently became part of Future Earth in 2014.

The current chairman of the Global Carbon Project is Rob Jackson of Stanford University. Previous co-chairs include Naki Nakicenovic of the International Institute for Applied Systems Analysis (IIASA), Corinne Le Quéré of the University of East Anglia, and Philippe Ciais of the Institut Pierre Simon Laplace (LSCE). Its executive director is Josep Canadell of Australia's Commonwealth Scientific and Industrial Research Organisation (CSIRO). The GCP has additional international offices in Tsukuba, Japan, and Seoul, Korea, and an international scientific steering committee consisting of a dozen scientists from five continents.

For the most recent Global Carbon Budget released in December 2018, the GCP projects fossil CO_{2} emissions in 2018 to rise by 2.7% (range 1.8% to 3.7%) to a record 37.1 billion tonnes (Gt) CO_{2}, as policy and market forces are currently insufficient to overcome growth in fossil energy use. Atmospheric CO_{2} concentration is set to increase by 2.3 ppm [range 2.0 to 2.6 ppm] to reach 407 ppm on average in 2018, 45% above pre-industrial levels. Increases in global use of natural gas and oil are the primary causes of rising atmospheric CO_{2} concentrations today. Global coal use will likely increase in 2018 but still remain below its historical peak in 2013. Over the past decade, coal has been displaced by natural-gas-fired, wind, and solar power in some countries.

For examples of earlier communications from GCP, in late 2006 researchers from the project determined that carbon dioxide emissions had dramatically increased to a rate of 3.2% annually from 2000. At the time, the chair of the group Dr. Mike Raupach stated that "This is a very worrying sign. It indicates that recent efforts to reduce emissions have had virtually no impact on emissions growth and that effective caps are urgently needed". A 2010 study conducted by the Project published in Nature Geoscience revealed that the world's oceans absorb 2.3 billion metric tonnes of carbon dioxide. On 5 December 2011 analysis released from the project claimed carbon dioxide from fossil-fuel burning jumped by the largest amount on record in 2010 to 5.9 percent from a growth rate in the 1990s closer to 1 percent annually. The combustion of coal represented more than half of the growth in emissions, the report found. They predict greenhouse gas emissions to occur according to the IPCC's worst-case scenario, as CO_{2} concentration in the atmosphere reaches 500ppm in the 21st century.

== Global Carbon Budget ==
Established by the GCP in 2005 the Global Carbon Budget is an annual publication of carbon cycle sources and sinks on a global level. In 2013 the annual publication of the Global Carbon Budget became a living data publication at the Earth System Science Data journal. Each year data is revised and updated along with any changes in analysis, results and the most up to date interpretation of the behaviour of the global carbon cycle.

The original measurements and data used to complete the global carbon budget are generated by multiple organizations and research groups around the world.

The effort presented by the GCP is mainly one of synthesis, where results from individual groups are collated, analysed and evaluated for consistency. The GCP facilitate access to original data with the understanding that the primary datasets will be referenced in future work (See Table). In depth descriptions of each component are provided by the original publications associated with those datasets.

The 2021 Global Carbon Budget report shows that a method has been shown to estimate the difference in emissions from land-use change from national greenhouse gas inventories, supporting an assessment of collective national climate progress.

Component	Primary Reference
Territorial fossil-fuel and cement emissions globally, by fuel type, and by country	Boden et al. (2013; CDIAC)
Consumption-based fossil-fuel and cement emissions by country	Peters et al. (2011) updated as described in Le Quéré et al. (2013)
Land-use change emissions	Houghton and Hackler (in review)
Atmospheric CO_{2} growth rate	Dlugokencky and Tans (2013; NOAA/ESRL)
Ocean and land CO_{2} sinks	Le Quéré et al. (2013) see references in paper for individual models.

== Global Carbon Atlas ==
Established by the GCP in 2013 the Global Carbon Atlas is a tool for visualizing data related to the global carbon cycle.

The Global Carbon Atlas is a platform to explore and visualize the most up-to-date data on carbon fluxes resulting from human activities and natural processes. Human impacts on the carbon cycle are the most important cause of climate change.

This web-based application allows the dissemination of the most up to date information on the global carbon cycle to a wider audience, from school children and lay people to policy makers and scientists. It consists of three components: 1) Outreach, 2) Emissions and 3) Research. The outreach component is aimed at the general public and those working in education. The emissions component is a visualisation tool for parts of the global carbon cycle that are related to emissions and is aimed primarily at policy makers. The research component is aimed primarily at researchers and acts as a data repository and visualisation tool for scientific data used to investigate the global carbon budget.

All components of the Global Carbon Atlas are updated on an annual basis, most recently in December 2018, based on the data published in the Global Carbon Budget.

== See also ==
- AIMES (Analysis, Integration and Modelling of the Earth System)
- List of countries by carbon dioxide emissions
