= Regional Scale Nodes =

Underwater observatory

The National Science Foundation's (NSF) Ocean Observatories Initiative (OOI) Regional Scale Nodes (RSN) component is an electro-optically cabled underwater observatory that directly connects to the global Internet. It is the largest cable-linked seabed observatory in the world, and also the first of its kind in the United States.

Located on the southern part of the Juan de Fuca Plate, off the coast of Washington and Oregon, it is the first ocean observatory to span a tectonic plate.

RSN utilizes several high-power, high-bandwidth sub-sea terminals called primary nodes which are linked together by fiber-optic cable and provide support to oceanographic sensors at key locations.

Upon completion of the network in 2014, RSN will cover a distance of over 900 kilometers at depths of up to 3000 meters. Implementation of the OOI Regional Scale Nodes is led by the University of Washington's (UW) School of Oceanography, the UW Applied Physics Laboratory, and L-3 MariPro.

Live RSN data from >100 seafloor and water column instruments will be made available live on the Internet. This will allow both scientists and the general public to study long-term changes in ocean systems over the next 25 years.

Construction of RSN will be completed in 2014. Efforts are substantially aided by the crews of ROPOS (Remotely Operated Platform for Observation Sciences. The 83-day VISIONS ’14 expedition aboard the 274-foot global-class R/V Thomas G. Thompson is responsible for the observatory's final implementation.

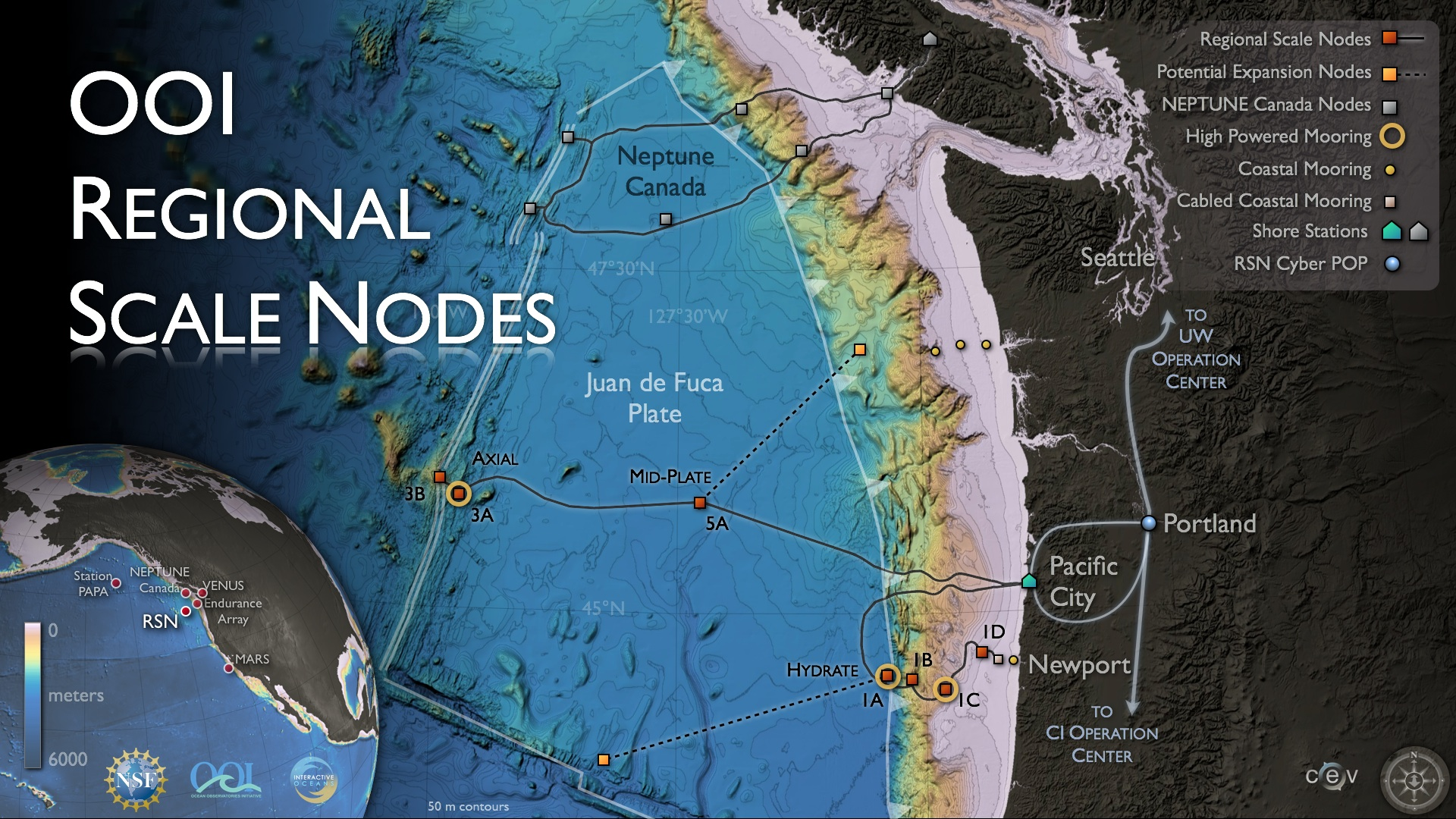
OOI Regional Scale Nodes Map

== Overview ==
The Regional Scale Nodes (RSN) is a component of the National Science Foundation's (NSF's) Ocean Observatories Initiative (OOI). The NSF's OOI is managed and coordinated by the OOI Project Office at the Consortium for Ocean Leadership (COL) in Washington, D.C. The UW, located in Seattle, Washington, is the RSN Implementing Organization for the COL.

The vision behind RSN is to launch a new era of scientific discovery and understanding of the oceans.

The RSN consists of two infrastructures: primary and secondary. The primary infrastructure network, which was designed, qualified, manufactured, and installed in 2012 by L-3 Maripro, consists of a shore facility located in Pacific City, Oregon; two fiber-optic cable lines covering a distance of 800 kilometers, and seven primary science nodes.

The RSN system delivers 200 kilowatts of power and 240Gbit/s of TCP/IP Internet data communications to the seven primary science nodes. RSN is designed to last for 25 years and is capable of significant expansion to serve future science needs.

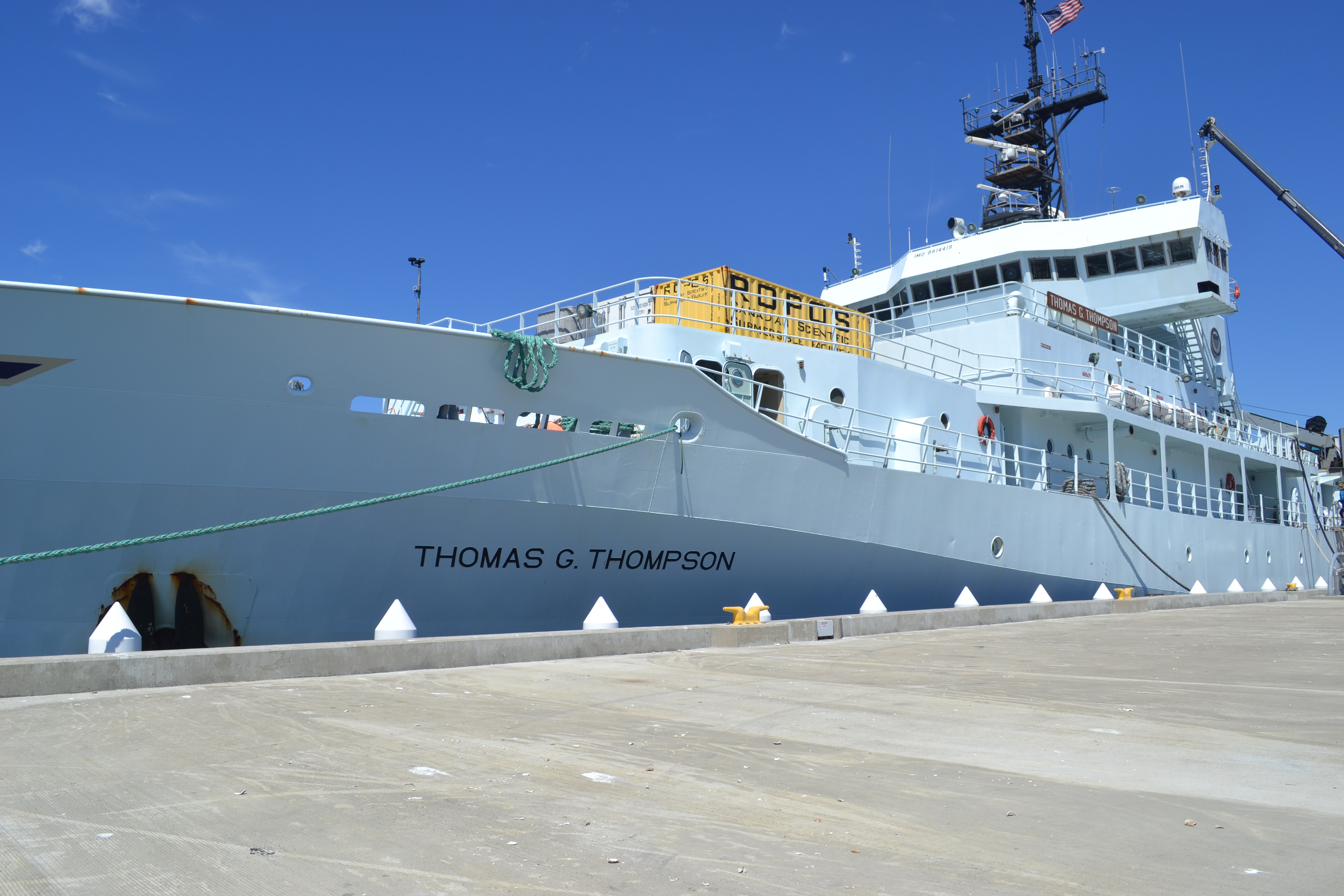
The R/V Thomas G. Thompson was used in building the OOI Regional Scale Nodes

== History ==
Prior to the emergence of underwater cabled observatories, oceanographers and other researchers studying the global ocean tended to rely on the use of research vessels and crewed submersibles in order to collect data. This was followed by a shift toward Remote Operated Vehicles (ROV's) and space-based research satellites. The limitation to these methods was that they were either not cost-effective, or data could only be collected for short durations. While the importance of expedition-based exploration was recognized, a solution was needed.

In 1987, the concept of utilizing high-power, high-bandwidth underwater cabled observatories emerged as a long-term, cost-effective solution for conducting real-time monitoring of ocean systems.

In the early 1990s, the United States and Canada formed an agreement to develop a plate-scale submarine electro-optically cabled ocean observatory in the northeast Pacific Ocean. This region is home to the smallest of Earth's tectonic plates – the Juan de Fuca plate. The small size and close coastal proximity of the Juan de Fuca plate presents a unique opportunity to observe the dynamic systems in submarine volcano regions.

The partnership between the U.S. and Canada developed into a plan to build a Canadian cabled array that would cover the upper 1/3 of the Juan de Fuca plate, and a U.S. system spanning the lower 2/3 of the plate (cite). Together, this plate-scale observatory would be called NEPTUNE (Northeast Pacific Time Series Underwater Networked Experiments) and would provide continuous observations for 25 years.

By the mid-2000s, NEPTUNE Canada had received full funding and their cabled array was completed and online by 2009. It was brought under the umbrella network of Ocean Networks Canada (ONC). Meanwhile, NEPTUNE U.S. was renamed to Regional Scale Nodes and became a component of the OOI. It is slated for completion in 2014. Both NEPTUNE Canada and RSN will be integrated through the ONC's digital infrastructure and the OOI Cyberinfrastructure providing real-time access to anyone connected to the Internet.

"The goal of the program is to launch an era of scientific discovery and understanding across and within the ocean basins, utilizing widely accessible, interactive telepresence. It's a new world. We will be present throughout the volume of the ocean, at will, communicating in real time...So what can we actually do tomorrow? We're about to ride the wave of technological opportunity. There are emerging technologies throughout the field around oceanography, which we will incorporate into oceanography, and through that convergence, we will transform oceanography into something even more magical."

— John Delaney, RSN Program Director and Principal Investigator

== Scientific Motivation ==
The scientific goals of RSN are significant. A vast array of natural phenomena that occur throughout the world's oceans and seafloor are found in the Northeast Pacific Ocean. As a whole, the mission of RSN is to provide a human telepresence in the ocean that will serve researchers, students, educators, policymakers, and the public. Scientists will be able to conduct local investigations of such global processes as major ocean currents, active earthquake zones, creation of new seafloor, and rich environments of marine plants and animals.

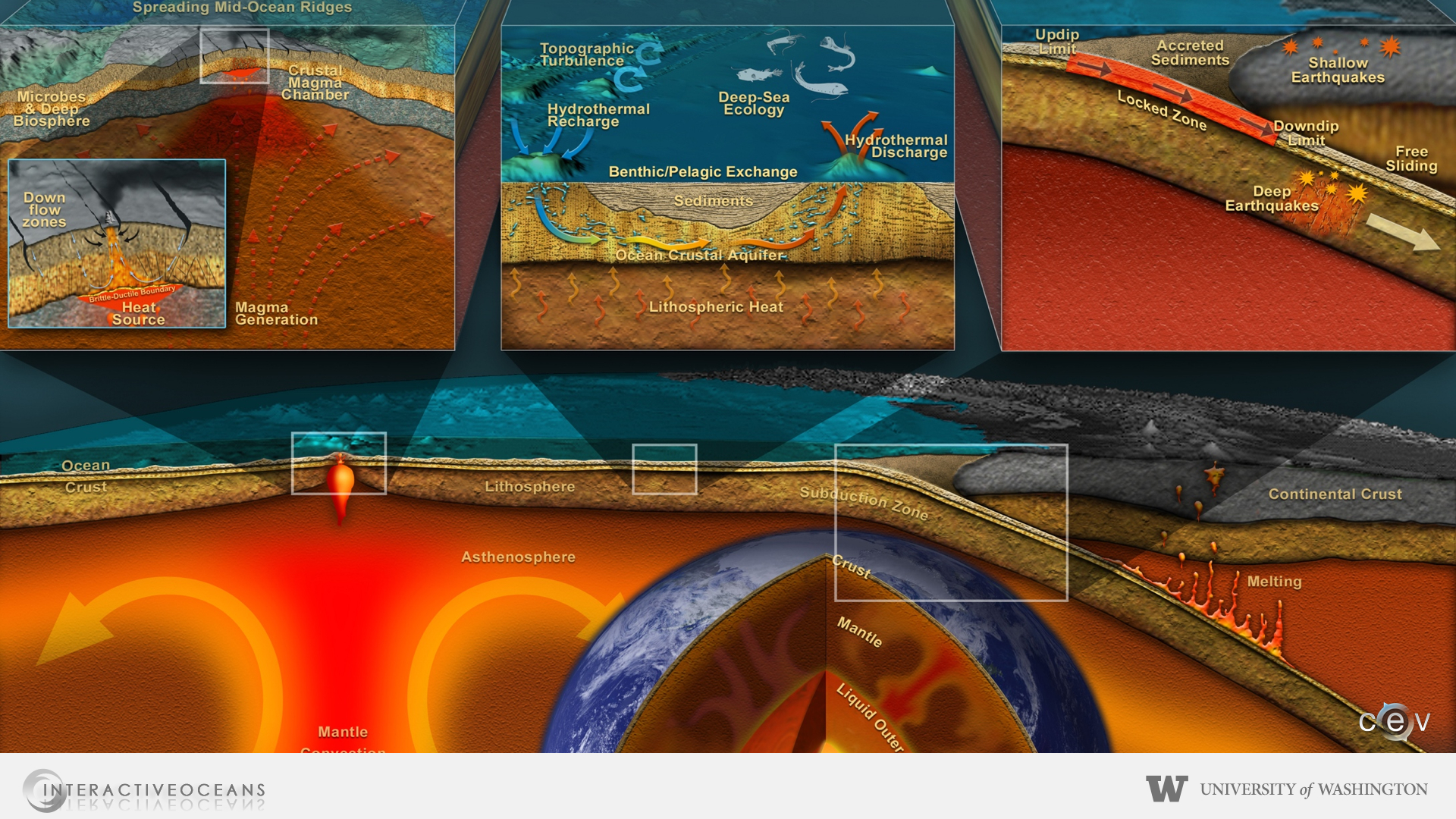
OOI Seafloor processes.

RSN is also designed to help anticipate both short and long-term ocean-generated threats and opportunities. Notably, RSN will be able to monitor the tectonic activity along the plate boundary. There is hope that seismic sensors could be installed at key areas along the spreading center which would serve as an early warning system for earthquakes and tsunamis.

The existence of a long-term cabled observatory will allow for long-term measurements of biological communities. In particular, the Juan de Fuca plate's divergent plate boundary has resulted in the existence of seafloor hydrothermal vents ecosystems, and other similar groups. These deep sea communities, thriving in extremely harsh environments, pose a number of unsolved scientific questions which RSN will be capable of investigating.

== Infrastructure ==
Regional Scale Nodes Station Maps

Primary Infrastructure

The primary infrastructure of RSN consists of seven primary nodes which were installed in 2012 by L-3 Maripro. They are terminal points which help distribute power and bandwidth to the networks of deployed sensors.

Approximately 900 kilometers of cable (referred to as backbone cable) have been used to connect the primary nodes together. These cables make landfall at the shore station in Pacific City, Oregon.

In 2005, over 175 scientists across the United States responded to a Request for Assistance from the National Science Foundation to develop a cabled observatory on the Juan de Fuca Plate. Nodes are located at pre-selected experimental sites throughout the Juan de Fuca plate. Axial Seamount, Hydrate Ridge on the Cascadia Margin and shallow water sites west of Newport, Oregon (the Endurance Array) all have primary nodes installed. The primary nodes are all located in environmentally benign areas.

Nodes also convert the 10kVdc voltage levels from the backbone cable to 375Vdc which is then directed to the secondary infrastructure. The 375V switching systems and Node telemetry systems were designed and manufactured by Texcel Technology Plc based in England. The software to manage the ports and telemetry protection systems was also supplied by Texcel as an element manager sitting under a Network Management System (NMS).

The primary nodes have a number of extra ports which offer the potential for large-scale future expansion (>100 kilometers).

Secondary Infrastructure

The converted 375Vdc voltage from the primary nodes is then directed at low-and medium-power nodes and junction boxes. The nodes and junction boxes (similar to power strips) offer direct power and communications to the instruments at the experimental sites. In concert, these parts make up the RSN secondary infrastructure. Extension cables are used to link the primary nodes to the secondary infrastructure, providing power and communications.

Equipment is linked using wet-mate connectors. Different types of cable were installed depending on load requirements. Bandwidth from these cables ranges from 10 Gbit/s to 1 Gbit/s.

During the VISIONS ’13 expedition to continue construction of RSN, over 22,000 meters of extension cables were installed on the ocean floor. The cables all successfully went online.

Upon completion in 2014, over 100 cabled seafloor and water column instruments will be operational. These instruments will allow monitoring of biological, chemical, geological, and geophysical processes in the ocean. The secondary infrastructure will also include six mooring systems for water-column profilers.

Cables are frequently deployed all across the world in ocean basins and margins. They have considerably long lifetimes. The backbone cable was installed in the summer of 2011. The commercial cable-laying ship, TE SubCom Dependable, carried out this phase of the project.

Special environmental requirements were also taken into account. Certain cables are substantially well-armored, especially those deployed in volcanic areas, such as Axial Seamount.

Images taken by ROPOS during RSN construction and survey dives

== Instruments ==
ROPOS prepares to deploy a shallow profiler

In order to fully understand complex ocean systems, a wide variety of sensor arrays, capable of surviving for long periods of time in harsh conditions, are necessary. A suite of sensors (over 100) were selected and strategically placed throughout RSN. They are located at Axial Seamount, Hydrate Ridge, and also on the water-column moorings.

Instruments connected to the RSN include:

- Conductivity Temperature Depth (located on profilers)
- Dissolved Oxygen,
- 3-D Single Point Current Meter
- Temperature
- Fluorometers
- CDOM,
- Chlorophyll-a,
- Optical Backscatter

The instruments are the final spot of each regional network branch.

=== Cyberinfrastructure ===
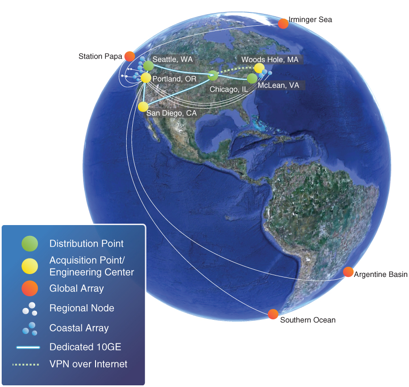
CI Deployment Topology. Graphic created by J.B. Matthews.

The Regional Scale Nodes is connected into the OOI Cyberinfrastructure.

The Cyberinfrastructure component of the OOI links marine infrastructure to scientists and users. The OOI Cyberinfrastructure manages and integrates data from all the different OOI sensors. It will provide a common operating infrastructure, the Integrated Observatory Network (ION), connecting and coordinating the operations of the marine components (global, regional, and coastal scale arrays). It will also provide resource management, observatory mission command and control, product production, data management and distribution (including strong data provenance), and centrally available collaboration tools.

The Integrated Observatory Network (ION) connects and coordinates the operations of the OOI marine components with the scientific and educational pursuits of oceanographic research communities. The cyberinfrastructure is being designed and constructed by the University of California, San Diego.

== Status ==
Construction of RSN is ongoing. As of September 19, 2014, the primary infrastructure and most of the secondary infrastructure was successfully in place, and OOI RSN and UW APL crews were working to complete the vertical moorings for the shallow profiler.

== Outreach ==
The University of Washington has welcomed student participation in the implementation of RSN. As of 2014, there have been eight expeditions in which students have had the opportunity to work aboard the R/V Thomas G. Thompson and witness the construction of the cabled observatory. During these cruises, students develop projects utilizing the array of technology and scientific equipment on board.

Students who participate in these expeditions go on to share their experiences with others.

In 2014, over 30 graduate and undergraduate students worked alongside the researchers, engineers, educators, and crew during the 83-day VISIONS ’14 expedition.
