= Benthic boundary layer =

Bottom layer of a body of water

The benthic boundary layer (BBL) is the layer of water directly above the sediment at the bottom of a body of water (river, lake, sea, etc.). Through specific sedimentation processes, certain organisms are able to live in this deep layer of water. The BBL is generated by the friction of the water moving over the surface of the substrate, which decreases the water current significantly in this layer. The thickness of this zone is determined by many factors, including the Coriolis force. The benthic organisms and processes in this boundary layer echo the water column above them.

The BBL serves as a transitional zone between the water column and the sediment layer by regulating biogeochemical processes and the flux of nutrients and organic materials. This zone also serves as the main layer of resistance for the shift of mass, heat, and nutrients from the sediment to the water, or vice versa. It is this area of interaction between the two environments that is important in many species' reproductive strategies, particularly larval dispersal. The benthic boundary layer also contains nutrients important in fisheries, a wide array of microscopic life, a variety of suspended materials, and sharp energy gradients. It is also the sink for many anthropogenic substances released into the environment, as the substances commonly sink to the bottom of the water column.

== Life in the deep-sea benthic boundary layer ==
The benthic boundary layer (BBL) represents a few tens of meters of the water column directly above the sea floor and constitutes an important zone of biological activity in the ocean. It plays a vital role in the cycling of matter, and has been called the “endpoint” for sedimenting material, which fuels high metabolic rates for microbial populations.

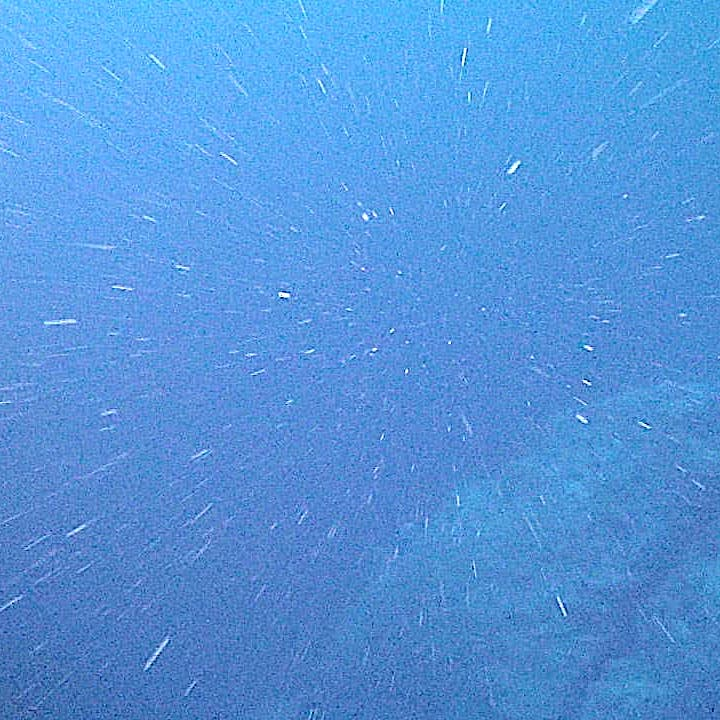
Marine snow as it is falling to the ocean floor.

After passing through the BBL, this degraded material is either returned to the water column or mobilized into the sediment, where it may eventually become immobilized. While the supply of particulate organic matter (POM), or marine snow, is relatively limited and inhibits species abundance, it sustains a complex yet understudied microbial loop that can maintain both meiofaunal and macrofaunal populations. In the microbial loop, non-moving benthic organisms living in the benthic boundary layer supply nutrients to the loop by releasing unused particles for use by microbial communities. In a study by Will Ritzrau (1996), it was determined that microbial activities were up to a factor of 7.5 higher in the BBL than in adjacent waters. While this study was completed at 100–400m depth, it could have implications for the deep BBL.

Organisms that live in the benthic boundary layer are known as being benthopelagic. All organisms living predominantly in the benthic boundary layer must acquire their food from falling particles in the water column. Bacterial growth and consumption of falling organic detritus is hindered by the hydrostatic pressure of water and increase in depth. This allows for changeable and consumable matter to reach the ocean floor and be consumed by benthic organisms. The quality and quantity of nutrients reaching the sea floor play a major role in the development of benthic communities. These organisms ultimately play a vital role in the remineralization of matter and aid in breaking down POM that may eventually become permanent sediment. Excluding hydrothermal vents, much of the deep sea benthos is allochthonous, and the importance of bacteria for substrate conversion is paramount.

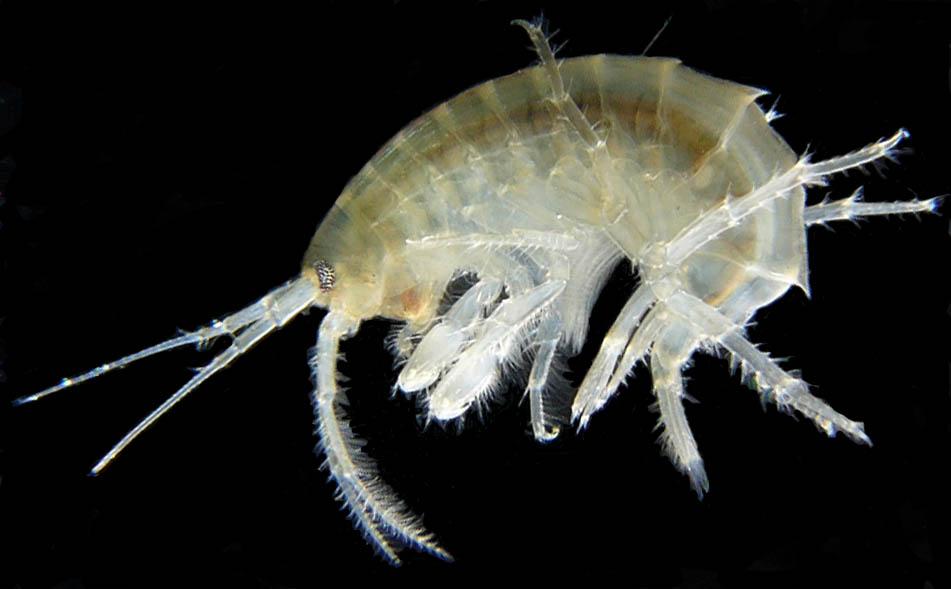
Possible amphipod that could live in the BBL.

Presently, it is known that deep-BBL bacterial populations are able to support protozoan bacterivores like foraminifera and some metazoan zooplankton, which in turn can support larger organisms. Meiofauna and macrofauna found in the deep BBL include: copepods, annelids, nematodes, bivalves, ostracods, isopods, amphipods, arthropods, and gastropods, to name a few. It is theorized that up to 10,000,000 species are living in the BBL. These organisms ultimately play a vital role in the remineralization of matter and aid in breaking down POM that may eventually become permanent sediment.

== Sedimentation in the benthic boundary layer ==
The benthic boundary layer (BBL) plays a vital role in the cycling of matter and is commonly referred to as the “endpoint” or "sink" for sediment material, which fuels high metabolic rates for microbial populations. The particles from the pelagic ecosystem sink to the BBL where they will be used by organisms. Studies have estimated that particles from the photic zone sink at a rate of approximately 100 meters per day. Up to 10% of sediment from the photic zone is able to sink all the way down to the benthic boundary layer. However, the total amount of mass that falls to the BBL is impacted by total pelagic production and seasonal variability. After passing through the BBL, this degraded material is either returned to the water column or mobilized into the sediment, where it may eventually become immobilized due to currents or sediment force. Re-suspension or upward fluxes of particles can occur due to environmental disturbances such as wind, currents, tide fluctuations, and benthic storms. With growing concern over the ultimate fate of matter in the ocean, knowledge of the complex biological processes in the deep-sea BBL and how they affect future sedimentation and remineralization rates is valuable to the scientific community.

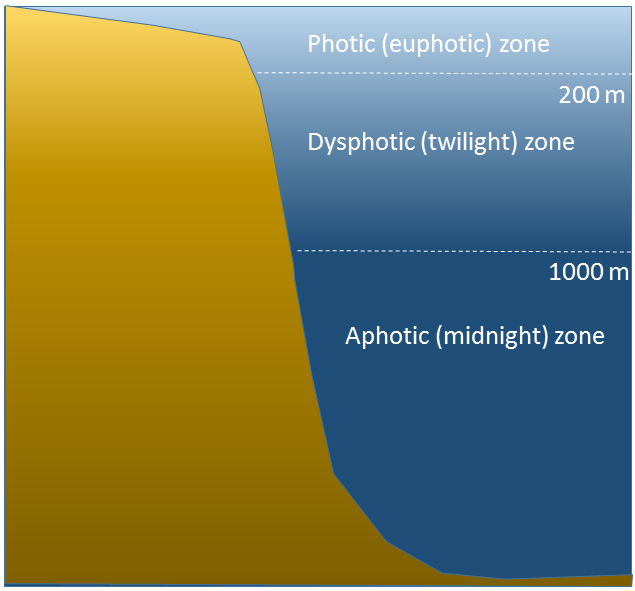
Light penetration occurs in the photic zone of the water.

At sea depths of 1800m or greater, the BBL is noted as having a near-homogeneous temperature and salinity with periodic fluxes of detritus or particulate organic matter (POM). POM is strongly linked to seasonal variations in surface productivity and hydrodynamic conditions. The amount of POM that sinks into the water is directly correlated with production in the photic zone of the water column.

== Future directions ==
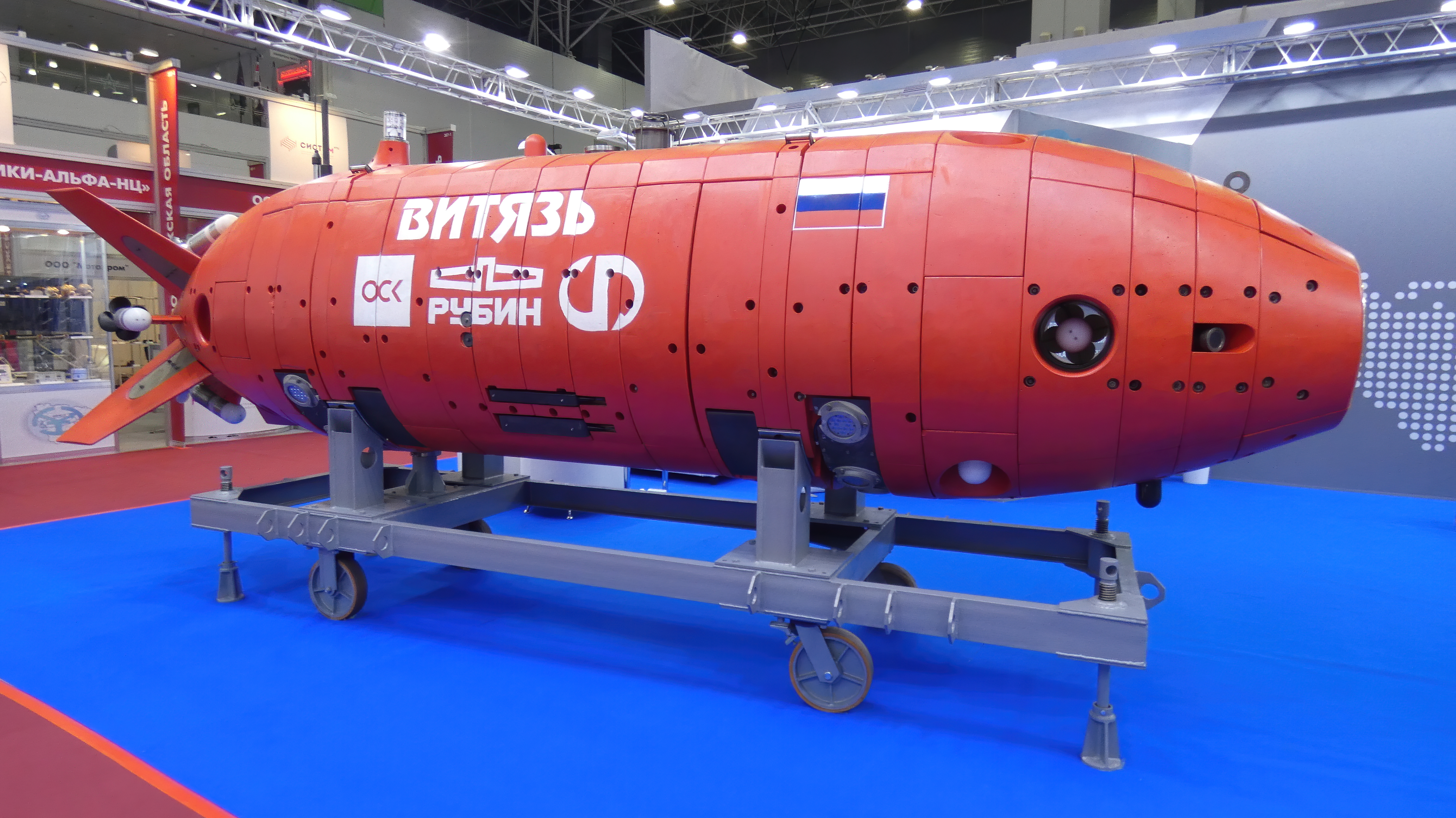
One example of an autonomous underwater vehicle.

This zone is of interest to biologists, geologists, sedimentologists, oceanographers, physicists, and engineers, as well as many other scientific disciplines. As the effects of anthropogenic activities begin taking an even greater toll on marine processes, long-term studies are essential in determining the health and stability of the deep BBL. Current climate variation and warming could also play a major role in changes in the BBL by decimating living species present there and could prompt long-term studies in future scientific communities. Currently, several groups are employing cabled observatories (ALOHA Cabled Observatory, Monterey Accelerated Research System, NEPTUNE, VENUS, and Liquid Jungle Lab (LJL) Panama- PLUTO) to work towards developing these much needed time-series. Cabled underwater networks provide continuous power to cabled instruments to allow for long-term studies. The cables also provide a way for data to be reviewed in real-time from the shore. Time-lapse cameras, sediment traps, bottom-transecting vehicles, baited traps, acoustic arrays, slaved cameras, and autonomous underwater vehicles (AUVs) are also being used to gather more information about the organisms and processes in the benthic boundary layer. Using these research techniques, scientists may begin to find new ways to conserve BBL communities and gather new data about species.

== Sources ==
- The Benthic Boundary Layer, Transport Processes and Biogeochemistry. Edited by Bernard P. Boudreau and Bo Barker Jørgensen . February 2001, Oxford University Press.
