= GCOS =

GCOS may refer to:

- Affymetrix GeneChip Operating Software
- Global Climate Observing System
- General Comprehensive Operating System, a family of operating systems oriented toward mainframes, originally called GECOS (General Electric Comprehensive Operating Supervisor)
- Global Cosmic Ray Observatory, a planned facility to detect ultra-high-energy cosmic rays

== See also ==
- GKOS keyboard
- Geckos
