= Global Earth Observation System of Systems =

Satellite constellation

The Global Earth Observation System of Systems (GEOSS) was built by the Group on Earth Observations (GEO) on the basis of a 10-Year Implementation Plan running from 2005 to 2015. GEOSS seeks to connect the producers of environmental data and decision-support tools with the end users of these products, with the aim of enhancing the relevance of Earth observations to global issues. GEOSS aims to produce a global public infrastructure that generates comprehensive, near-real-time environmental data, information and analyses for a wide range of users. The Secretariat Director of Geoss is Barbara Ryan.

== Earth observation systems ==
Earth observation systems consist of instruments and models designed to measure, monitor and predict the physical, chemical and biological aspects of the Earth system. Buoys floating in the oceans monitor temperature and salinity; meteorological stations and balloons record air quality and rainwater trends; sonar and radar systems estimate fish and bird populations; seismic and Global Positioning System (GPS) stations record movements in the Earth's crust and interior; some 60-plus high-tech environmental satellites scan the planet from space; powerful computerized models generate simulations and forecasts; and early warning systems issue alerts to vulnerable populations.

These various systems have typically operated in isolation from one another. In recent years, however, sophisticated new technologies for gathering vast quantities of near-real-time and high-resolution Earth observation data have become operational. At the same time, improved forecasting models and decision-support tools are increasingly allowing decision makers and other users of Earth observations to fully exploit this widening stream of information.

With investments in Earth observations now reaching a critical mass, it has become possible to link diverse observing systems together to paint a full picture of the Earth's condition. Because the costs and logistics of expanding Earth observations are daunting for any single nation, linking systems together through international cooperation also offers cost savings.

== Implementation ==
As a networked system, GEOSS is owned by all of the GEO Members and Participating Organizations. Partners maintain full control of the components and activities that they contribute to the system of systems. Implementation is being pursued through a Work Plan consisting of over 70 tasks. Each task supports one of the nine societal-benefit or four transverse areas and is carried out by interested Members and Participating Organizations. Governments and organizations have also advanced GEOSS by contributing a variety of “Early Achievements”; these “First 100 Steps to GEOSS” were presented to the 2007 Cape Town Ministerial Summit.

Interlinking observation systems requires common standards for architecture and data sharing. The architecture of an Earth observation system refers to the way in which its components are designed so that they function as a whole. Each GEOSS component must be included in the GEOSS registry and configured so that it can communicate with the other participating systems. In addition, each contributor to GEOSS must subscribe to the GEO data-sharing principles, which aim to ensure the full and open exchange of data, metadata and products. These issues are fundamental to the successful operation of GEOSS.

GEOSS will disseminate information and analyses directly to users. GEO is developing the GEOPortal as a single Internet gateway to the data produced by GEOSS. The purpose of GEOPortal is to make it easier to integrate diverse data sets, identify relevant data and portals of contributing systems, and access models and other decision-support tools. For users without good access to high-speed internet, GEO has established GEONETCast, a system of four communications satellites that transmit data to low-cost receiving stations maintained by the users.

At present, GEONETCast seems still in its infancy, yet some tools have already been worked out. The GEONETCast toolbox has been made available and contains tools to access some radar altimetry, vegetation, satellite prediction and maritime information. Other useful information available through GEONETCast is vegetation and desert locust information provided under the DevCoCast project, which is a subproject of GEONETCast.

== User groups ==
The growing demand for Earth observation data and information is the driving force behind GEOSS. The GEOSS Implementation Plan identifies nine distinct groups of users and uses, which it calls “Societal Benefit Areas”. The nine areas are disasters, health, energy, climate, water, weather, ecosystems, agriculture and biodiversity. Current and potential users include decision makers in the public and private sectors, resource managers, planners, emergency responders and scientists.

== Related initiatives ==
GEOSS can be characterized as a contribution towards the establishment of a spatial data infrastructure. It is one of three related initiatives that are the subject of the GIGAS (GEOSS, INSPIRE and GMES an Action in Support) harmonization project under the auspices of the EU 7th Framework Programme.

== Participating organizations ==
- AARSE: African Association of Remote Sensing of the Environment
- ACCREC: African Climate Change Research Centre
- ADIE: Association for the Development of Environmental Information
- ADPC: Asian Disaster Preparedness Center
- Afriterra Foundation
- APN: Asia-Pacific Network for Global Change Research
- CATHALAC: Water Center for the Humid Tropics of Latin America and the Caribbean
- CEOS: Committee on Earth Observation Satellites
- CEDARE: Centre for Environment and Development for the Arab Region and Europe
- CGMS: Coordination Group for Meteorological Satellites
- CMO: Caribbean Meteorological Organization
- COSPAR: Committee on Space Research
- DIVERSITAS
- EARSC: European Association of Remote Sensing Companies
- ECMWF: European Centre for Medium-Range Weather Forecasts
- EEA: European Environment Agency
- EIS-AFRICA: Environmental Information Systems - AFRICA
- EPI: Environment Pulse Institute
- ESA: European Space Agency
- ESEAS: European Sea Level Service
- EUMETNET: Network of European Meteorological Services - Composite Observing System
- EUMETSAT: European Organization for the Exploitation of Meteorological Satellites
- EuroGeoSurveys: Association of the Geological Surveys of Europe
- FAO: Food and Agriculture Organization of the United Nations
- FDSN: International Federation of Digital Seismograph Networks
- GBIF: Global Biodiversity Information Facility
- GCOS: Global Climate Observing System
- GSDI: Global Spatial Data Infrastructure
- GOOS: Global Ocean Observing System
- GTOS: Global Terrestrial Observing System
- IAG: International Association of Geodesy
- ICSU: International Council for Science
- IEEE: Institute of Electrical and Electronics Engineers
- IGBP: International Geosphere-Biosphere Program
- IGFA: International Group of Funding Agencies for Global Change Research
- IHE Delft Institute for Water Education
- IHO: International Hydrographic Organization
- IISL: International Institute for Space Law
- ILTER: International Long Term Ecological Research Network
- INCOSE: International Council on Systems Engineering
- IO3C: International Ozone Commission
- IOC: Intergovernmental Oceanographic Commission
- ISCGM: International Steering Committee for Global Mapping
- ISDR: International Strategy for Disaster Reduction
- ISPRS: International Society for Photogrammetry and Remote Sensing
- OGC: Open Geospatial Consortium
- POGO: Partnership for Observation of the Global Ocean
- Radiant Earth
- RFF: Resources for the Future
- SICA/CCAD: Central American Commission for the Environment and Development
- SOPAC: South Pacific Applied Geoscience Commission
- UNCBD: United Nations Convention on Biodiversity
- UNEP: United Nations Environment Programme
- UNESCO: United Nations Educational, Scientific and Cultural Organization
- UNFCCC: United Nations Framework Convention on Climate Change
- UNITAR: United Nations Institute for Training and Research
- UNOOSA: United Nations Office for Outer Space Affairs
- UNU-EHS: United Nations University - Institute for Environment and Human Security
- WCRP: World Climate Research Programme
- WFPHA: World Federation of Public Health Associations
- WMO: World Meteorological Organization

== Societal Benefit Areas ==
Societal Benefit Areas (SBAs) are eight environmental fields of interest, all of which relate to climate, around which the GEOSS project is exerting its efforts. These include the categories and subcategories below.

A preliminary hierarchical vocabulary has been created. Currently, the hierarchical vocabulary structuring these societal benefit categories and their subcategories are available only in English. However, translations have been created for French, Spanish and Italian versions by Claudia Cialone and Kristin Stock of the Centre for Geospatial Science (CGS) at the University of Nottingham, UK, with input from a number of people from the Consiglio Nazionale delle Ricerche (CNR) in Italy, the University of Zaragoza and the European Union Joint Research Centre (JRC). Translations have also been accomplished for a Slovenian version of the SBAs by the Biotehnical faculty of the University of Ljubljana, SI.

=== Disaster Resilience ===
This SBA is meant to increase the system of the earth observation to protect human lives from natural hazards such as tsunami, sea and lake ice, floods, volcanic eruptions, wild fires etc.

=== Public Health Surveillance ===
The health SBA is meant to understand and to prevent the environmental factors related to human diseases. Some subcategories included in this concern infectious diseases, respiratory problems, environmental stress, accidental death and injury and so forth.

=== Energy and mineral resource management ===
This SBA is concerned with the preservation and the operations related to energetic sources, and their renewability. Some examples of subcategories for this field are: oil & gas exploration, refining and transport operations, renewable energy operations, global energy management etc..

=== Water resources management ===
The water topic is inherent to hydrological research, evaluation and management and the impact of humans on the water cycle. The area includes subfields of interest such as global biogeochemistry, fisheries and habitat, telecommunication and navigation, predictions etc.

=== Infrastructure and transport ===
This category provides information for Earth observations support for planning, monitoring and management of infrastructure (dams, roads, rail, ports and pipelines) and transportation (air, land and sea).

=== Food security and sustainable agriculture ===
This field of concern embraces all those agricultural activities, or related subjects such as grazing systems, the economic trade of agricultural products, for monitoring the global condition of food including the prevention of desertification.

=== Biodiversity and ecosystem sustainability ===
This area is meant to disseminate information related to the investigation on the genetic diversity of species and more generally on the natural resources of the different ecosystems and the services available for their conservation.
