= Ocean observations =

List of currently feasible essential observations for climate research

The following are considered ocean essential climate variables (ECVs) by the Ocean Observations Panel for Climate (OOPC) that are currently feasible with current observational systems .

== Ocean climate variables ==
=== Atmosphere surface ===
- Air Temperature
- Precipitation (meteorology)
- Evaporation
- Air Pressure, sea level pressure (SLP)
- Surface radiative fluxes
- Surface thermodynamic fluxes
- Wind speed and direction
- Surface wind stress
- Water vapor

=== Ocean surface ===
- Sea surface temperature (SST)
- Sea surface salinity (SSS)
- Sea level
- Sea state
- Sea ice
- Ocean current
- Ocean color (for biological activity)
- Carbon dioxide partial pressure (pCO2)

=== Ocean subsurface ===
- Backscatter
- Carbon Dioxide
- Chlorophyll
- Conductivity
- Density
- Iron
- Irradiance
- Nutrients
  - Nitrate
- Methane
- Ocean current
  - Single Point
  - Water Column
- Ocean tracers
- Oxygen
- Phytoplankton
- Salinity
- Sigma-T
- Sound Velocity
- Temperature
- Turbidity

== Ocean observation sources ==
=== Satellite ===
There is a composite network of satellites that generate observations. These include:

Type	Variables observed	Responsible organizations
Infrared (IR)	SST, sea ice	CEOS, IGOS, CGMS
AMSR-class microwave	SST, wind speed, sea ice	CEOS, IGOS, CGMS
Surface vector wind (two wide-swath scatterometers desired)	surface vector wind, sea ice	CEOS, IGOS, CGMS
Ocean color	chlorophyll concentration (biomass of phytoplankton)	IOCCG
high-precision altimetry	sea-level anomaly from steady state	CEOS, IGOS, CGMS
low-precision altimetry	sea level	CEOS, IGOS, CGMS
Synthetic aperture radar	sea ice, sea state	CEOS, IGOS, CGMS

=== In situ ===
There is a composite network of in situ observations. These include:

Type	Variables observed	Responsible organizations
Global surface drifting buoy array with 5 degree resolution (1250 total)	SST, SLP, Current (based on position change)	JCOMM Data Buoy Cooperation Panel (DBCP)
Global tropical moored buoy network (about 120 moorings)	typically SST and surface vector wind, but can also include SLP, current, air-sea flux variables	JCOMM DBCP Tropical Moored Buoy Implementation Panel (TIP)
Volunteer Observing Ship (VOS) fleet	all feasible surface ECVs	JCOMM Ship Observations Team (SOT)
VOSClim	all feasible surface ECVs plus extensive ship metadata	JCOMM Ship Observations Team (SOT)
Global referencing mooring network (29 moorings)	all feasible surface ECVs	OceanSITES
GLOSS core sea-level network, plus regional/national networks	sea level	JCOMM GLOSS
Carbon VOS	pCO2, SST, SSS	IOCCP
Sea ice buoys	sea ice	JCOMM DBCP IABP and IPAB

=== Subsurface ===
There is a composite network of subsurface observations. These include:

Type	Variables observed	Responsible organizations
Repeat XBT (Expendable bathythermograph) line network (41 lines)	Temperature	JCOMM Ship Observations Team (SOT)
Global tropical moored buoy network (~120 moorings)	Temperature, salinity, current, other feasible autonomously observable ECVs	JCOMM DBCP Tropical Moored Buoy Implementation Panel (TIP)
Reference mooring network (29 moorings)	all autonomously observable ECVs	OceanSITES
Sustained and repeated ship-based hydrography network	All feasible ECVs, including those that depend on obtaining water samples	IOCCP, CLIVAR, other national efforts
Argo (oceanography) network	temperature, salinity, current	Argo
Critical current and transport monitoring	temperature, heat, freshwater, carbon transports, mass	CLIVAR, IOCCP, OceanSITES
Regional and global synthesis programmes	inferred currents, transports gridded fields of all ECVs	GODAE, CLIVAR, other national efforts
Cabled ocean observatories	audio, backscatter, chlorophyll, CO2, conductivity, currents, density, Eh, gravity, iron, irradiance, methane, nitrate, oxygen, pressure, salinity, seismic, sigma-T, sound velocity, temperature, turbidity, video	Ocean Networks Canada, Monterey Accelerated Research System, Ocean Observatories Initiative, ALOHA, ESONET (European Seas Observatory NETwork), Dense Oceanfloor Network System for Earthquakes and Tsunamis (DONET), Fixed-Point Open Ocean Observatories (FixO3).

== Accuracy of measurements ==
The quality of in situ measurements is non-uniform across space, time and platforms. Different platforms employ a large variety of sensors, which operate in a wide range of often hostile environments and use different measurement protocols. Occasionally, buoys are left unattended for extended periods of time, while ships may involve a certain amount of human-related impacts in data collection and transmission. Therefore, quality control is necessary before in situ data can be further used in scientific research or other applications. One example of quality control and monitoring of sea surface temperatures measured by ships and buoys is the iQuam system developed at NOAA/NESDIS/STAR, where statistics show the quality of in situ measurements of sea surface temperatures.

One of the problems facing real-time ocean observatories is the ability to provide a fast and accurate assessment of the data quality. Ocean Networks Canada is in the process of implementing real-time quality control on incoming data. For scalar data, the aim is to meet the guidelines of the Quality Assurance of Real Time Oceanographic Data (QARTOD) group. QARTOD is a US organization tasked with identifying issues involved with incoming real-time data from the U.S Integrated Ocean Observing System (IOOS). A large portion of their agenda is to create guidelines for how the quality of real-time data is to be determined and reported to the scientific community. Real-time data quality testing at Ocean Networks Canada includes tests designed to catch instrument failures and major spikes or data dropouts before the data is made available to the user. Real-time quality tests include meeting instrument manufacturer's standards and overall observatory/site ranges determined from previous data. Due to the positioning of some instrument platforms in highly productive areas, we have also designed dual-sensor tests e.g. for some conductivity sensors. The quality control testing is split into 3 separate categories. The first category is in real-time and tests the data before the data are parsed into the database. The second category is delayed-mode testing where archived data are subject to testing after a certain period of time. The third category is manual quality control by an Ocean Networks Canada data expert.

== Historical data available ==
OceanSITES manages a set of links to various sources of available ocean data, including: the Hawaiian Ocean Timeseries (HOT), the JAMSTEC Kuroshio Extension Observatory (JKEO), Line W monitoring the North Atlantic's deep western boundary current, and others.

This site includes links to the ARGO Float Data, The Data Library and Archives (DLA), the Falmouth Monthly Climate Reports, Martha's Vineyard Coastal Observatory, the Multibeam Archive, the Seafloor Data and Observation Visualization Environment (SeaDOVE): A Web-served GIS Database of Multi-scalar Seafloor Data, Seafloor Sediments Data Collection, the Upper Ocean Mooring Data Archive, the U.S. GLOBEC Data System, U.S. JGOFS Data System, and the WHOI Ship Data-Grabber System.

There are a variety of data sets in a data library listed at Columbia University:

This library includes:

- LEVITUS94 is the World Ocean Atlas as of 1994, an atlas of objectively analyzed fields of major ocean parameters at the annual, seasonal, and monthly time scales. It is superseded by WOA98.
- NOAA NODC WOA98 is the World Ocean Atlas as of 1998, an atlas of objectively analyzed fields of major ocean parameters at monthly, seasonal, and annual time scales. Superseded by WOA01.
- NOAA NODC WOA01 is the World Ocean Atlas 2001, an atlas of objectively analyzed fields of major ocean parameters at monthly, seasonal, and annual time scales. Replaced by WOA05.
- NOAA NODC WOA05 is the World Ocean Atlas 2005, an atlas of objectively analyzed fields of major ocean parameters at monthly, seasonal, and annual time scales.

In situ observations spanning from the early 1700s to present are available from the International Comprehensive Ocean Atmosphere Data Set (ICOADS).

This data set includes observations of a number of surface ocean and atmospheric variables from ships, moored and drifting buoys and C-MAN stations.

In 2006, Ocean Networks Canada began collecting high-resolution in-situ measurements from the seafloor in Saanich Inlet, near Victoria, British Columbia, Canada. Monitoring sites were later extended to the Strait of Georgia and 5 locations off the west coast of Vancouver Island, British Columbia, Canada. All historical measurements are freely available via Ocean Networks Canada's data portal, Oceans 2.0.

== Future developments ==
Areas requiring research and development

- Satellite observations with higher resolution and accuracy and more spectral bands from geostationary satellites
- improved capability for ocean color observations in coastal and turbid waters
- improved interpretation of sea-ice data from satellites
- satellite measurement of salinity
- Observing system evaluation and design, including improvements in air-sea flux parameterizations.
- Improvements in ocean platforms, including increased capabilities for Argo floats
- improved glider technology and mooring technology.
- New development in ocean sensors and systems, including improved bio-fouling protection, autonomous water sampling systems, optical and acoustic systems, airborne variable sensors, and two-way, low-cost, low-power telecommunications.
- New and improved capability to measure biogeochemical variables, nutrients, and dissolved oxygen and carbon dioxide, as well as to identify organisms.
- Improved instruments, including near-surface current meters, in-water radiometers, sensors for air-sea interface variables and turbulent fluxes, and VOS sensor systems.

The future of oceanic observation systems:

- Guided unmanned underwater vehicles

== Organizations ==
- GOOS (The Global Ocean Observing System)
- GCOS (Global Climate Observing System)
- IOOS (Integrated Ocean Observing System)
- Argo
- GODAE (Global Ocean Data Experiment)
- Ocean Networks Canada
- OOPC (Ocean Observations Panel for Climate)
- OOI (Ocean Observatories Initiative)
- FixO3 (Fixed-Point Open Ocean Observatories)

== See also ==
- Offshore survey
- Cabled observatory
