= Kate Moran =

Canadian oceanographer

Kathryn (Kate) Moran
- Education: University of Rhode Island; Dalhousie University; University of Pittsburgh
- Known for: Paleoclimatology Oceanography Ocean Engineering
- Scientific career
- Workplaces: Ocean Networks Canada

Kathryn (Kate) Moran OC is an ocean engineer and Professor in the Faculty of Science at the University of Victoria. She is president and CEO of Ocean Networks Canada.

== Education ==
Kate Moran grew up in Pennsylvania, where she first became interested in the ocean. Moran completed a bachelor's degree in Civil Engineering at the University of Pittsburgh. She spent some time working at Procter and Gamble before joining a new program in Ocean Engineering at the University of Rhode Island. After receiving a job offer from the Atlantic Geoscience Centre, she moved to Nova Scotia. She received her PhD in 1995 from Dalhousie University, under the supervision of Hans Uaziri and Geoff Meyerhoff.

== Research ==
Moran researches marine geotechnics and paleoclimatology and has led several oceanographic expeditions. In 2004 she was part of a team to extract 400 metres of sediment core from the Arctic sea floor, using it to understand the changing climate in the Arctic. The expedition was organised by the Swedish Polar Research Secretariat, who even threw a party for the scientists on the ice. Her team identified the earthquake that was the cause of the 2004 Indian Tsunami. She was described by Todd McLeish as knowing "more about the history of Arctic climate change than anyone".

In 2008, Moran delivered testimony to the US Senate committee on Environmental and Public Works outlining the scientific evidence for climate change, and future predictions which resulted from the research. Between 2009 - 2011 Moran was seconded to President Obama's White House Office of Science and Technology Policy. Obama instructed the federal government to develop an ocean policy, which was released in 2012. Moran was involved with the government's response to the Deepwater Horizon oil spill in 2010. Moran was selected to be on Secretary Steven Chu's team in that response. Moran describes the efforts as "an incredible response, actually, by BP and the government". She is a supporter of renewable energy, "when I first started to be seriously concerned about the fact we need to stop [creating] CO2, I got involved in the first offshore wind farm in the U.S".

In 2012, Moran took over as president and CEO of Ocean Networks Canada, where she oversees Canada's advanced cabled ocean observatories, NEPTUNE, in the Northeast Pacific Ocean and VENUS. The cabled observatories are open-access: their data are provided free-of-charge to anyone in the world. She is a board member of the Clear Seas Centre for Responsible Marine Shipping.

In 2012, Moran delivered a TEDx talk in Vancouver, entitled "Connecting our Planet's Oceans... To the Internet". Her observation systems provide 24 hour monitoring of ocean processes. In 2015 she secured $5 million funding from the British Columbia government for early earthquake detection. In 2017, Moran won a $2.4 million grant from the Canada Foundation for Innovation to build a new observatory to provide information on seismic and tsunami risks in British Columbia. She is an "Expert on Priority Research Questions for Canadian Open Science".

Moran was appointed to the Order of Canada in June 2023, with the rank of Officer.
