= Monterey Accelerated Research System =

Cabled-based observatory system below the surface of Monterey Bay

Monterey Accelerated Research System (MARS) is a cabled-based observatory system below the surface of Monterey Bay, developed and managed by the Monterey Bay Aquarium Research Institute. The system, operational since November 10, 2008, incorporates a 52 km (32 mi) undersea cable that carries data and power to benthic instrument nodes, AUVs, and various benthic and moored instrumentation.

== See also ==
- NEPTUNE
- VENUS
