= Global Climate Observing System =

Organization

- Abbreviation: GCOS
- Formation: 1992; 34 years ago
- Type: INGO
- Region served: Worldwide
- Official language: English
- Parent organization: United Nations Framework Convention on Climate Change (UNFCCC)
- Website: GCOS Official website

The Global Climate Observing System (GCOS) was established in 1992 as an outcome of the Second World Climate Conference, to ensure that the observations and information needed to address climate-related issues are obtained and made available to all potential users. The GCOS is co-sponsored by the World Meteorological Organization (WMO), the Intergovernmental Oceanographic Commission (IOC) of UNESCO, the United Nations Environment Programme (UNEP), and the International Council for Science (ICSU). In order to assess and monitor the adequacy of in-situ observation networks as well as satellite-based observing systems, GCOS regularly reports on the adequacy of the current climate observing system to the United Nations Framework Convention on Climate Change (UNFCCC), and thereby identifies the needs of the current climate observing system.

GCOS is a system that comprises the climate-relevant components of many contributing observing systems and networks. Its mission is to help ensure that these contributing systems, taken as a whole, provide the comprehensive information on the global climate system that is required by users, including individuals, national and international organizations, institutions and agencies. The programme promotes the sustained provision and availability of reliable physical, chemical and biological observations and data records for the total climate system - across the atmospheric, oceanic and terrestrial domains, including the hydrological cycle, the carbon cycle and the cryosphere.

== Structure ==
The primary observing systems contributing to the GCOS are the WMO Integrated Global Observing System (WIGOS), the Global Cryosphere Watch (GCW), and the World Hydrological Cycle Observing System (WHYCOS), and the Intergovernmental Oceanographic Commission-led Global Ocean Observing System (GOOS). A number of other domain-based and cross-domain research and operational observing systems also provide important contributions and encompass both in-situ and satellite observations. GCOS is both supported by and supports the international scientific and technical community, and the World Climate Research Programme (WCRP) co-sponsors the expert panels set up by GCOS for the atmospheric, oceanic and terrestrial domains. The composite observing system designated by GCOS serves as the climate-observation component of the broader Global Earth Observation System of Systems (GEOSS), and at the same time a number of specific observing-system initiatives of GEOSS contribute to the GCOS.

== Essential climate variables (ECVs) ==
GCOS has identified 50 essential climate variables (ECVs) considered to be feasible for global climate observation and to have a high impact on the requirements of the UNFCCC and other stakeholders. There is a strong need for sustained observation of these ECVs, as the observations are needed for the generation and updating of global climate products and derived information. GCOS and its partners are developing ways of improving the generation and supply of data products relating to the ECVs.

== Expert panels ==
Three expert panels have been established by the GCOS Steering Committee to define the observations needed in each of the main global domains – atmosphere, oceans, and land – to prepare specific programme elements and to make recommendations for implementation. GCOS is both supported by and supports the international scientific community, and therefore the three expert panels are co-sponsored by the World Climate Research Programme (WCRP). The Atmospheric, Ocean, and Terrestrial Observation Panel for Climate gather scientific and technical experts in the respective areas to generate inputs from these fields to the climate observing community. Those expert panels report to the GCOS Steering Committee, and have been established to define the observations needed in each of the main global domains to prepare scientific programme-elements and to make recommendations for implementation.

=== Atmospheric Observation Panel for Climate (AOPC) ===
AOPC was established in recognition of the need for specific scientific and technical input concerning atmospheric observations for climate. Its aim is to ensure the quality, long-term homogeneity and continuity of data needed. AOPC supports and is supported by the WMO Integrated Global Observing System (WIGOS).

Key activities of AOPC are:

- Assessing the current state of the atmospheric component of the global observing system for climate and identify its gaps and adequacies;
- Securing the implementation of designated GCOS Networks and promote the establishment and enhancement of new and current systems to provide long-term and consistent data and information for Essential Climate Variables, such as earth radiation budget, surface radiation, greenhouse gases, water vapour, clouds and aerosols;
- Liaising with relevant research, operational and end-user bodies in order to determine and maintain the requirements for data to monitor, understand and predict the dynamical, physical and chemical state of the atmosphere and its interface on seasonal and multi-decadal time scales, on both global and regional levels;
- Promoting the transfer and accessibility to the user community, as well as the rehabilitation of historical observational and proxy climate data sets.

=== Ocean Observations Panel for Climate (OOPC) ===
OOPC, co-sponsored by GOOS, as well as GCOS and WCRP, is a scientific and technical advisory group charged with making recommendations for a sustained global ocean observing system for climate in support of the goals of its sponsors. This includes recommendations for phased implementation. The Panel also aids in the development of strategies for evaluation and evolution of the system and of its recommendations, and supports global ocean observing activities by interested parties through liaison and advocacy for the agreed observing plans.

OOPC recognizes the need for sustainable ocean observations, and the increased need to connect to societal issues in the coastal zone. OOPC's role has evolved to oversee the ocean component of the GCOS, and the physical variables for GOOS, while defining long-term observing requirements for climate research of WCRP.

Key activities of OOPC are:

- Providing advice on scientific and technical requirements to the Joint WMO-IOC Technical Commission on Oceanography and Marine Meteorology (JCOMM), which is responsible for the coordination and implementation of platform-based observing system components;
- Coordinate ocean observing networks that contribute to ocean ECVs by encouraging GOOS Regional Alliances (GRAs) and national commitments to global observing networks, and promoting common best practices and observing standards;
- Reviewing and prioritizing requirements for sustained ocean observations of the physical Essential Ocean Variables (EOVs), and ocean ECVs, to engage the broad stakeholder community, to assess the readiness of observing technologies and adequacy of present global key variable observations, and to provide a source of technical advice on the development of national coastal and ocean observing requirements and observing system implementation plans.

=== Terrestrial Observation Panel for Climate (TOPC) ===
TOPC was set up to develop a balanced and integrated system of-in situ and satellite observations of the terrestrial ecosystem. The Panel focuses on the identification of terrestrial observation requirements, assisting the establishment of observing networks for climate, providing guidance on observation standards and norms, facilitating access to climate data and information and its assimilation, and promoting climate studies and assessments.

Key activities of TOPC are:

- Identification of measurable terrestrial (biosphere, cryosphere, and hydrosphere) properties and key variables (ECVs) that control the physical, biological and chemical processes affecting climate, and are indicators of climate change;
- Coordination of activities with other global observing system panels and task groups to ensure the consistency of requirements with the overall programmes;
- Assessing and monitoring the adequacy of terrestrial observing networks such as the Global Terrestrial Networks (GTNs), and promoting their integration and development to measure and exchange climate data and information;
- Identification of gaps in present observing systems and designs to ensure long-term monitoring of terrestrial ECVs.

== Networks ==
One of the first tasks of the GCOS programme was to define a subset of the World Weather Watch (WWW) stations appropriate for basic climate monitoring. The subset of roughly 1000 baseline surface stations became the GCOS Surface Network (GSN), while a subset of 150 upper air stations was designated as the GCOS Upper-Air Network (GUAN). These were built on existing WMO classifications and became the initial baseline components of the atmospheric networks. Considerations for selection of GSN included spatial distribution, length and quality of record, long-term commitment, and degree of urbanization. Similar considerations were used for GUAN. Designation of these networks benefited both the GCOS and the National Meteorological and Hydrological Services (NMHS). For NMHSs, designation of a station as part of the global climate network helped sustain support for these sites with long-term records. The networks provided the foundation for the Regional Basic Climatological Network, which provides far greater spatial detail on the variability of climate.

Recognizing that a balance has to be struck between standards and completeness of ground-based measurement, the GCOS programme recognized a hierarchy of observational networks and systems, comprising comprehensive, baseline and reference networks based on assumptions of spatial sampling needs.

An example of a particularly successful step forward in implementing a global observing system for climate is the initiation of a reference network for upper-air observations - the GCOS Reference Upper-Air Network (GRUAN). The network is the prototype of a hybrid observing system, combining operational upper-air measurement sites with research sites and providing high-quality reference data for atmospheric profiles. GRUAN sites are undertaking high-quality atmospheric profile measurements that will help understand trends in upper-air ECVs, assist in investigating processes in the upper-troposphere and lower stratosphere, and provide data for calibrating satellite measurements and validating independent climate analyses and models. At GRUAN sites, the principles of quality, traceability and complete error characterization have been heeded, for at least part of the observing programme. The network is planned to grow over its initial size of 15 stations in coming years; introducing climate quality standards to a larger number of sites.
