= Global Ocean Observing System =

Ocean observation system

The Global Ocean Observing System (GOOS) is a global system for sustained observations of the ocean comprising the oceanographic component of the Global Earth Observing System of Systems (GEOSS). GOOS is administrated by the Intergovernmental Oceanographic Commission (IOC), and joins the Global Climate Observing System, GCOS, and Global Terrestrial Observing System, GTOS, as fundamental building blocks of the GEOSS.

== Overview ==
GOOS is a platform for:

- International cooperation for sustained observation of the oceans.
- Generations of oceanographic products and services.
- Interaction between research, operational, and user communities.

GOOS serves oceanographic researchers, coastal managers, parties to international conventions, national meteorological and oceanographic agencies, hydrographic offices, marine and coastal industries, policymakers, and the interested general public.

GOOS is sponsored by the IOC, UNEP, WMO, and ICSU. It is implemented by member states via their government agencies, navies and oceanographic research institutions working together in a wide range of thematic panels and regional alliances.

The GOOS Scientific Steering Committee provides guidance, while Scientific and Technical Panels evaluate Essential Ocean Variable observation systems. The secretariat director, from 2004 to 2011 was Keith Alverson. The secretariat director from 2011–2022 it was Albert Fischer.

== Essential ocean variables ==
Essential Ocean Variables (EOVs) are a collection of ocean properties selected in a way so as to provide the best, most cost-effective suite of data that enables quantification of key ocean processes. They are selected based on their Relevance, Feasibility, and Cost effectiveness. They fall into four categories - physics, biogeochemistry, biology and ecosystems, and cross-disciplinary. Their consistent usage is promoted by agencies such as GOOS and Southern. The EOVs are:

- Physics
  - Sea state
  - Ocean surface stress
  - Sea ice
  - Sea surface height
  - Sea surface temperature
  - Subsurface temperature
  - Surface currents
  - Subsurface currents
  - Sea surface salinity
  - Subsurface salinity
  - Ocean surface heat flux
- Biogeochemistry
  - Oxygen
  - Nutrients
  - Inorganic carbon
  - Transient tracers
  - Particulate matter
  - Nitrous oxide
  - Stable carbon isotopes
  - Dissolved organic carbon
- Biology and Ecosystems
  - Phytoplankton biomass and diversity
  - Zooplankton biomass and diversity
  - Fish abundance and distribution
  - Marine turtles, birds, mammals abundance and distribution
  - Hard coral cover and composition
  - Seagrass cover and composition
  - Macroalgal canopy cover and composition
  - Mangrove cover and composition
  - Microbe biomass and diversity (*emerging)
  - Invertebrate abundance and distribution (*emerging)
- Cross-disciplinary
  - Ocean color
  - Ocean Sound

== See also ==
- Global Sea Level Observing System (GLOSS)
- Integrated Ocean Observing System
- Terrestrial Ecosystem Monitoring Sites (GTOS)
