= VENUS =

Cabled sea floor observatory

Victoria Experimental Network Under the Sea
- Alternative names: VENUS
- Location: British Columbia, Canada
- Established: 2006
- Website: oceannetworks.ca/observatories/pacific/strait-georgia

The Victoria Experimental Network Under the Sea (VENUS) is one of two principal cabled seafloor observatories operated by Ocean Networks Canada at the University of Victoria, British Columbia, Canada.

The VENUS cabled ocean observatory is designed to provide new ways of studying the ocean. Since its launch in 2006, it has enabled scientists to run and monitor various ocean experiments remotely.

The aim of VENUS is to study coastal oceans in two sites near Victoria and Vancouver, British Columbia. The first site of the VENUS seafloor network, operational since February 2006, is located in Saanich Inlet at 100m. The second site is located in the deeper waters of the Strait of Georgia and links instrument arrays deployed at depths varying from 100 to 300 meters.

VENUS uses Internet, telecommunication technology, and a network of about 50 kilometers of fiber optic cables at a maximum depth of 300 meters to create a permanent link to cameras and other monitoring instruments on the seafloor. The VENUS observatory has scores of sensors that measure such parameters as temperature, salinity, and pressure of the water 24 hours a day. The seafloor instruments provide oceanographers, marine biologists, and geologists with real-time ocean data. Ship-based ocean research methods provide a snapshot view only, whereas the VENUS observatory can be like a continuous film, which will allow more reliable long term observation.

The data, including images and audio, are processed and made available to researchers and the public through the VENUS website. The goal of the project is to not only provide valuable information to advance research, but also to allow members of the public to log on and view the ocean up close.

The facility is funded by the federal and provincial governments of Canada, as well as private industry. VENUS is designed to provide continuous observations for 20–25 years.

== See also ==
- NEPTUNE Canada, a sister observatory to VENUS, also operated by Ocean Networks Canada.
- MARS, a similar MBARI cabled-based oceanography observatory.
- SATURN, Science and Technology University Research Network, a coastal margin, or river-to-ocean, testbed observatory for the United States Pacific Northwest, a project of the National Science Foundation Science and Technology Center for Coastal Margin Observation and Prediction.
