= Ocean Observatories Initiative =

Network of ocean observatories

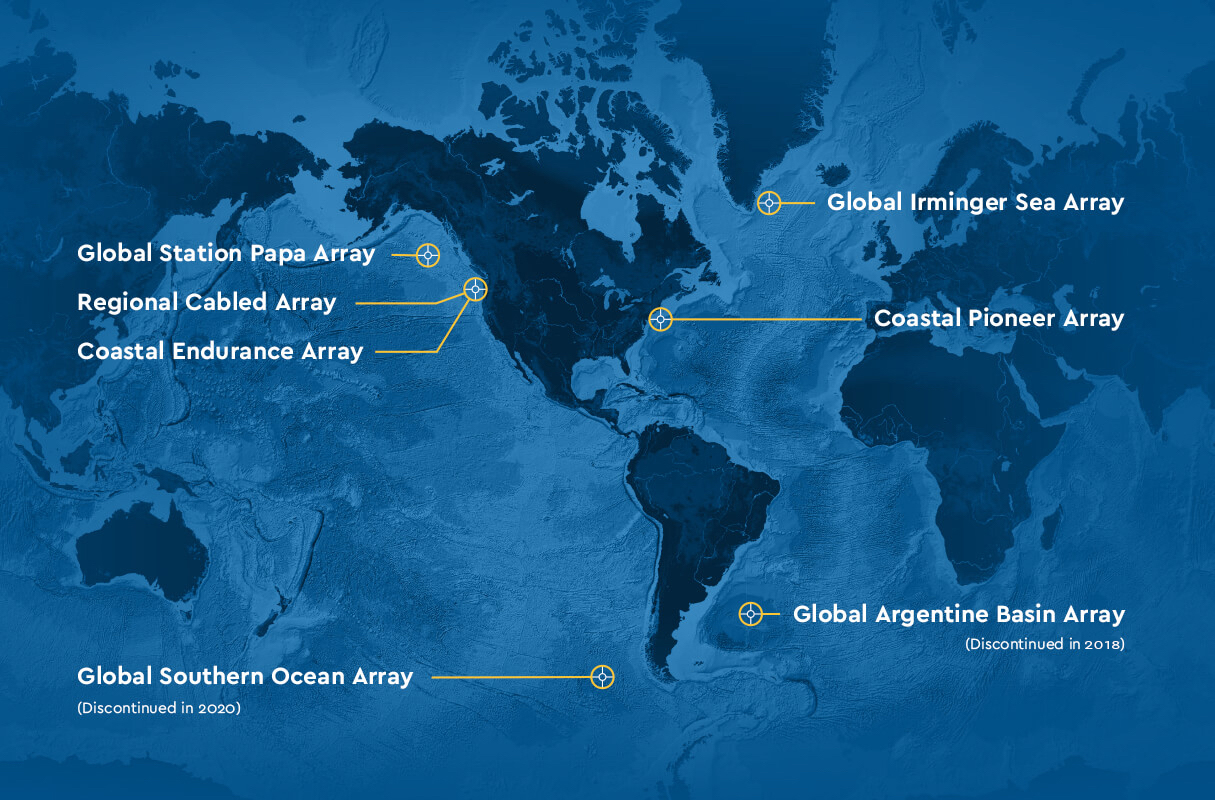
Map of OOI's arrays that continuously collect ocean data. Credit: Center for Environmental Visualization, University of Washington

The Ocean Observatories Initiative (OOI) is a National Science Foundation (NSF) Major Research Facility composed of a network of science-driven ocean observing platforms and sensors in the Atlantic and Pacific Oceans. This networked infrastructure measures physical, chemical, geological, and biological variables from the seafloor to the sea surface and overlying atmosphere, providing an integrated data collection system on coastal, regional and global scales. OOI's goal is to deliver data and data products for a 25-year-plus time period, enabling a better understanding of ocean environments and critical ocean issues.

== History ==
As early as 1987, the ocean sciences community began discussions about the science, design concepts, and engineering of ocean research observatories, leading to the formation of the International Ocean Network (ION) in 1993. The ION national committee was formed in 1995 and later expanded into the Dynamics of Earth and Ocean Systems (DEOS) committee, tasked with providing a focus for exploratory planning for an ocean observatory network. In 2003 the Pew Oceans Commission recommended changes designed to improve society's use and stewardship of, and impact on, the coastal and global ocean.

Momentum for research-oriented ocean observing built with two National Research Council (NRC) studies in 2000 and 2003 ("Illuminating the Hidden Planet: The Future of Seafloor Observatory Science" and "Enabling Ocean Research in the 21st Century" ), and a series of community workshops. In 2000, the National Science Board (NSB) approved the OOI as a potential Major Research Equipment and Facilities Construction project for inclusion in a future National Science Foundation budget, which allowed for focused planning efforts.

In 2004, the NSF Division of Ocean Sciences (NSF OCE) established the OOI Project Office under the Ocean Research Interactive Observatory Network (ORION) to coordinate further OOI planning between two independent but complementary groups, Joint Oceanographic Institutions (JOI) and Consortium for Ocean Research and Education (CORE). The Program Office subsequently transitioned solely to JOI, which then merged with CORE to form the Consortium for Ocean Leadership in 2007. In 2005, the OOI Project Office asked for the ocean research community's help in developing the OOI network design by soliciting Request for Assistance (RFA) proposals that resulted in 48 proposals, representing the thoughts and ideas of more than 550 investigators and direct participants, and the involvement of over 130 separate educational and research institutions. Using the responses from the RFA process and associated review results, the OOI ORION Project Office and the external Science & Technical Advisory Committee developed an initial Conceptual Network Design (CND) for the OOI, which then served as the focus of an OOI Design and Implementation Workshop in March 2006.

In August 2006, NSF convened a Conceptual Design Review (CDR) to assess the project's technical feasibility and budget, the Project's Management Plan, including schedules and milestones, and education and outreach plans. The CDR Panel affirmed that the OOI, as proposed, would transform oceanographic research in the coming decades, and that the CND provided a good starting point for developing the OOI network.

Further refinement of the design based on engineering best-practices and financial reviews caused the initial CND to be revisited. The OOI Project Office working with the OOI advisory committees, consisting of unconflicted members of the community, and in consultation with NSF, then generated a revised CND.

In 2007, the National Science and Technology Council's Joint Subcommittee on Ocean Science and Technology developed an Ocean Research Priorities Strategy (ORPS), which provides a research investment framework to advance understanding of ocean processes and interactions that facilitate responsible use of the ocean environment. The ORPS identified three cross-cutting elements, one of which is ocean observing for research and management.

In late 2007, the OOI project completed its Preliminary Design Review and in 2008 completed its Final Network Design Review resulting in the Final Network Design. In May 2009, the National Science Board authorized the Director of NSF to award funds for the construction and initial operation of the OOI. In September 2009, NSF and the Consortium for Ocean Leadership signed a Cooperative Agreement that initiated the construction phase of the OOI.

Locations of OOI's global arrays were selected by a team of roughly 300 scientists to target regions that were under-sampled and subject to extreme conditions (e.g., high winds and sea states) that were challenging for continuous or even frequent ship-based measurements. The originally planned global study sites include instrumented moorings and gliders in four locations: Argentine Basin, Irminger Sea, Southern Ocean, and Station Papa.

The first year of funding under the cooperative agreement supported a range of construction efforts performed by the Marine Implementing Organizations (Woods Hole Oceanographic Institution, University of Washington, and Oregon State University), including production, engineering, and prototyping of key coastal and open-ocean components (moorings, buoys, sensors), award of the primary seafloor cable contract, completion of a shore station for power and data, and software development for sensor interfaces to the network. Subsequent years of funding supported the design, build, and deployment of coastal, deep-ocean, and seafloor systems.

The OOI was commissioned and accepted by the NSF in 2016 and data from more than 900 sensors at the seven sites became freely available for download in and near-real time online. The annual budget is approximately $44 million.

In 2018, in keeping with some of the recommendations laid out in Sea Change: 2015-2025 Decadal Survey of Ocean Sciences, the Argentine Basin Array was descoped and the Southern Ocean Array was reduced in scope to the surface mooring only, which was later removed in 2020. All OOI data collected at the Argentine Basin and Southern Ocean sites continue to be served on the OOI website.

In October 2018, the Program Management Office of the OOI shifted from the Consortium for Ocean Leadership to the Woods Hole Oceanographic Institution.

In May 2026, the National Science Foundation began retrieving the buoys and shutting down the program under the Trump administration. The Senate had previously restored the funding twice and then opposed the dismantling. The effort was stopped in mid-June and the buoys already removed would be serviced and returned to the ocean.

== Organizational structure ==
The OOI Program is managed and coordinated by the OOI Project Office at the Woods Hole Oceanographic Institution (WHOI), with four organizations responsible for operations and maintenance of specific components of the OOI system.

- Woods Hole Oceanographic Institution is responsible for the Coastal & Global Scale Nodes, which includes the Coastal Pioneer Array and two Global Arrays, including their associated moorings, autonomous vehicles, and sensors.
- Oregon State University is responsible for the Coastal Endurance Array moorings, autonomous vehicles, and sensors.
- University of Washington is responsible for the Regional Cabled Array, including its cabled seafloor systems, moorings, and sensors.
- Oregon State University is responsible for the OOI data center.

== Themes ==
The sites and platforms of the OOI components target the following key scientific processes:

=== Ocean-atmosphere exchange ===
Quantifying the air-sea exchange of energy and mass, especially during high winds (greater than 20 meters-per-second), is critical to providing estimates of energy and gas exchange between the surface and deep ocean and improving the predictive capability of storm forecasting and climate change models.

=== Climate variability, ocean circulation and ecosystems ===
Climate variability affects ocean circulation, weather patterns, the ocean's biochemical environment and marine ecosystems. Understanding how these processes change in current and future conditions is a key motivation for collecting multidisciplinary observations.

=== Turbulent mixing and biophysical interactions ===
Turbulent mixing plays a critical role in the transfer of materials within the ocean and in the exchange of energy and gases between the ocean and atmosphere. Horizontal and vertical mixing within the ocean can have a profound effect on a wide variety of biological processes.

=== Coastal ocean dynamics and ecosystems ===
The coastal ocean is host to a variety of dynamic and heterogeneous processes, including human influences, which often strongly interact. Better understanding of these complex and intertwined relationships and their impacts will aid mastery and management of coastal resources in a changing climate.

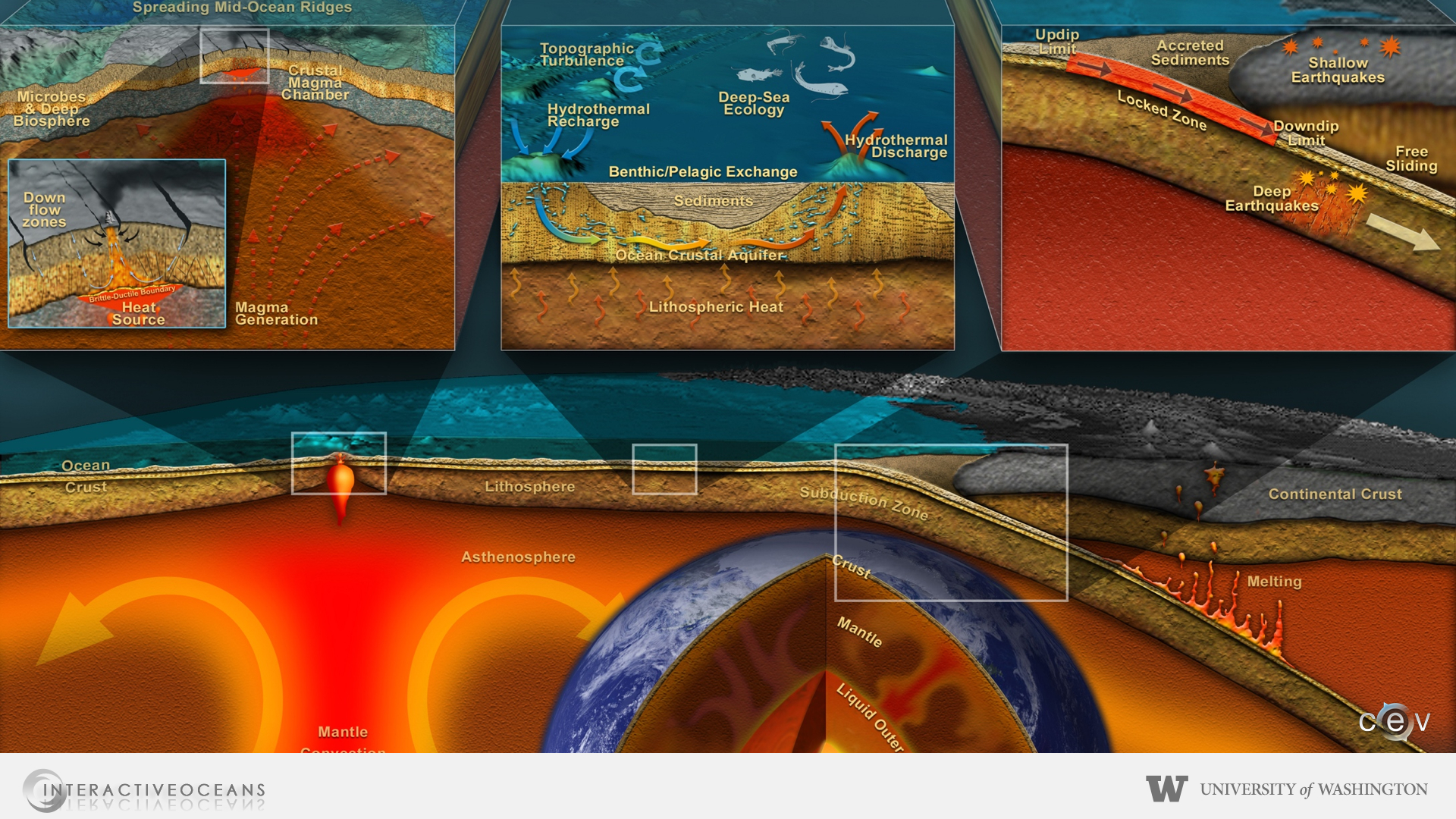
OOI Seafloor processes. Image Credit: OOI Regional Cabled Array program and the Center for Environmental Visualization, University of Washington

=== Plate-scale, ocean geodynamics ===
Active tectonic plate boundaries influence the ocean from physical, chemical and biological perspectives to varying degrees. Lithospheric movements and interactions at plate boundaries at or beneath the seafloor are responsible for short-term events such as earthquakes, tsunamis and volcanic eruptions. These regions are also host to the densest hydrothermal and biological activity in the ocean basins.

=== Fluid-rock interactions and the subseafloor biosphere ===
The oceanic crust contains the largest aquifer on Earth and supports a vast deep biosphere. Thermal circulation and reactivity of seawater-derived fluids can modify the composition of oceanic plates, lead to the formation of hydrothermal vents that support unique micro- and macro-biological communities and concentrate methane to form massive methane gas and methane hydrate reservoirs.

== Components ==
The OOI is composed of two coastal arrays (Coastal Pioneer Array and Coastal Endurance Array), two global arrays (Global Irminger Sea Array and Global Station Papa Array), the Regional Cabled Array (RCA), and Cyberinfrastructure. Data continue to be served from the discontinued arrays in the Argentine Basin and Southern Ocean.

=== Coastal and Global Arrays ===
Coastal arrays provide sustained, adaptable access to complex coastal systems. Coastal arrays extend from the continental shelf to the continental slope, allowing scientists to examine coastal processes including upwelling, hypoxia, shelf break fronts, and the role of filaments and eddies in cross-shelf exchange. Technologies that gather data in the coastal region include moored buoys with fixed sensors, moored vertical profilers, seafloor cables, gliders and autonomous underwater vehicles.

The coastal observatory includes a long-term Endurance Array in the Eastern Pacific and a re-locatable Pioneer Array in the Western Atlantic. Woods Hole Oceanographic Institution installed and operates the Pioneer Array. Oregon State University installed and operates the Endurance Array.

There are two global arrays currently in operation (Global Irminger Sea Array and Global Station Papa Array). The Argentine Basin and the Southern Ocean Arrays were removed, but their data remain available through OOI's data portal.

==== Coastal Pioneer Array ====
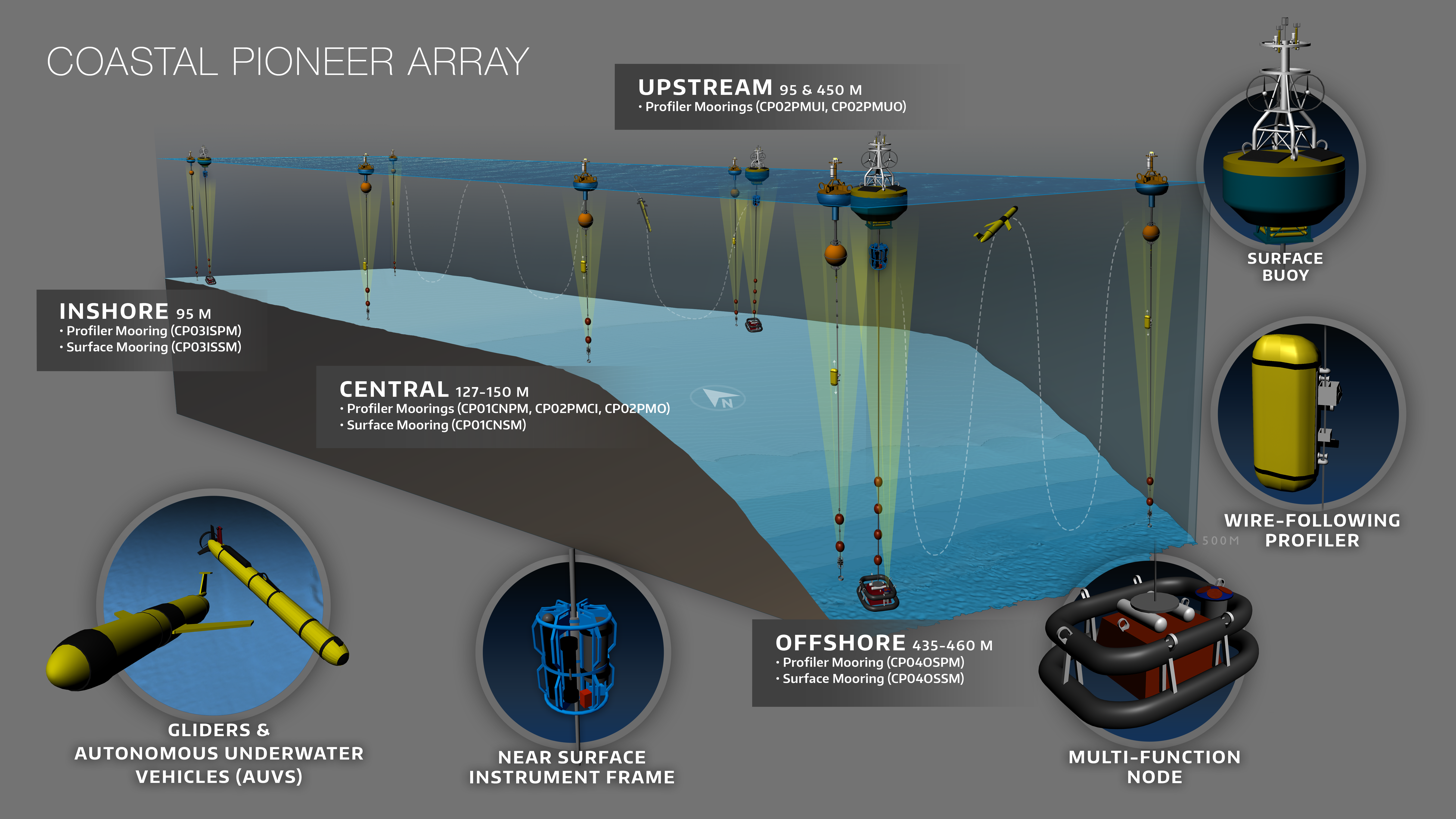
The Coastal Pioneer Array, located on the Mid-Atlantic Bight south of Cape Cod, will soon be moved further south on the Mid-Atlantic Bight, off the coast of North Carolina. Credit: Center for Environmental Visualization, University of Washington.

The Coastal Pioneer Array is a network of platforms and sensors that operate on the continental shelf and slope south of New England. A moored array was centered at the shelf break in the Mid-Atlantic Bight south of Cape Cod, Massachusetts. In 2024, the Coastal Pioneer Array was relocated to the southern Mid-Atlantic Bight, between Cape Hatteras and Norfolk Canyon off the coast of North Carolina.

Coastal Pioneer Array data enable scientists to examine how exchange processes structure physical, chemical and biological properties over the continental shelf and slope. Continuous rapid sampling at intervals of hours to days over multiple spatial scales (meters to hundreds of kilometers) provides insight into oceanographic processes that occur through more than one seasonal or annual cycle.

===== Scientific motivation =====
The Mid-Atlantic Bight shelf-break front is a persistent oceanographic feature associated with the changing bathymetry of the continental shelf and slope. The frontal region is influenced by Gulf Stream rings, meanders and filaments.

The frontal region is associated with along- and cross-shelf transport of heat, freshwater, nutrients, and carbon. These fluxes control water mass and ecosystem characteristics in multiple regions. Many of the processes along the shelf-break front evolve rapidly and occur over short spatial scales.

===== Design =====
The Pioneer Array provides a three-dimensional view of key biophysical interactions at the shelf break using its flexible, multiplatform array that combines moored and mobile components with high spatial and temporal resolution. The array includes seven sites of moorings that span along 9 km and across 47 km of continental shelf. The mooring sites are located 9.2 km to 17.5 km apart from each other. Three of the seven sites contain paired moorings. In its initial location south of Cape Cod, the Pioneer is embedded within an established regional observing system. The Pioneer Array is planned to move from place to place over approximately five-year intervals to characterize processes in different coastal ocean environments.

Two autonomous underwater vehicles (AUVs) sample the frontal region in the vicinity of the moored array and five coastal gliders resolve mesoscale features on the outer shelf and the slope sea between the shelf break front and the Gulf Stream. Two profiling gliders have acted as moorings by sampling at a single point. Gliders monitor a total area of 185 km by 130 km. Nominal AUV missions sample in the along-shelf and cross-shelf directions in two 14 km by 47 km rectangles.

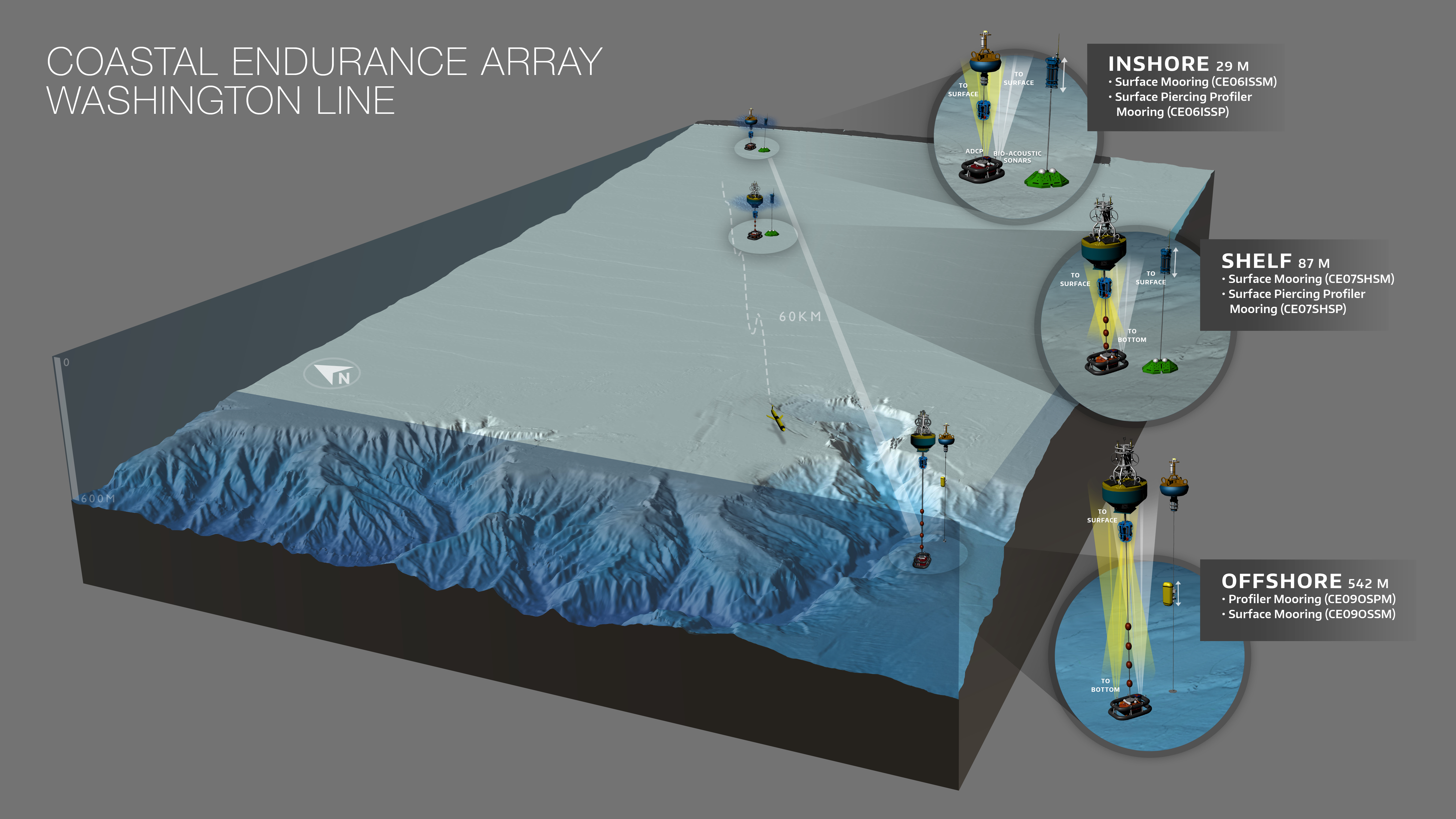
The Coastal Endurance Washington Line, one of two lines of moorings off the coasts of Washington and Oregon. Credit: Center for Environmental Visualization, University of Washington.

==== Coastal Endurance Array ====
The Coastal Endurance Array, located on the continental shelf and slope off Oregon and Washington, provides a long-term network of moorings, benthic nodes, cabled and uncabled sensors and gliders. It is part of a larger network of observatories on the Pacific Coast which also includes the OOI Regional Cabled Array, the OOI Global Station Papa Array and NOAA Pacific Marine Environmental Laboratory (PMEL) Surface Buoy, and Ocean Networks Canada observatories.

===== Scientific Motivation =====
The array focuses on observing inter-annual (e.g. El Niño-Southern Oscillation) and decadal (e.g. Pacific Decadal Oscillation) patterns. Instruments examine wind-driven upwelling and downwelling dynamics as well as the influence of the Columbia River on the coastal ecosystem.

===== Design =====
The array consists of two lines of moorings, one off Newport, Oregon (the Oregon Line) and the other off Grays Harbor, Washington (the Washington Line). The site for the Oregon Line was selected because it is close to the historic Newport Hydrographic Line, along which regular oceanographic sampling has occurred since 1961. The site of the Washington Line was selected as a companion line to the north. Both areas are influenced by the nearby Columbia River plume, the largest source of freshwater to the US west coast.

Glider observations span 500 km from northern Washington (~48°N) to Coos Bay, Oregon (~43°N). Gliders sample from 20 m isobaths between the mooring lines along one north–south transect at 126°W and five east–west transects out to 126°W or to 128°W for transects intersecting with the arrays. Some Endurance Array Oregon Line infrastructure connects to the RSN cabled network to provide enhanced power and communications for observing water column and seafloor processes.

==== Global Arrays ====
Locations of the global arrays were selected by a team of scientists (~300 people) based on regions that are under-sampled and subject to extreme conditions (e.g., high winds and sea states) that are challenging for continuous or even frequent ship-based measurements. The planned global study sites included instrumented moorings and gliders in four locations: Argentine Basin; Irminger Sea; Southern Ocean; and Station Papa. The Global Argentine Basin Array and the Global Southern Ocean Array were decommissioned in 2018 and 2020, respectively. The global arrays are developed and operated by Woods Hole and Scripps.

Observations from these high latitude areas are critical to understanding ocean circulation and climate change processes. The global arrays include moorings composed of fixed and moving sensors that measure air-sea fluxes of heat, moisture, and momentum—as well as physical, biological, and chemical properties of the water column. Each array also includes gliders to sample within the array's footprint.

==== Global Irminger Sea Array ====
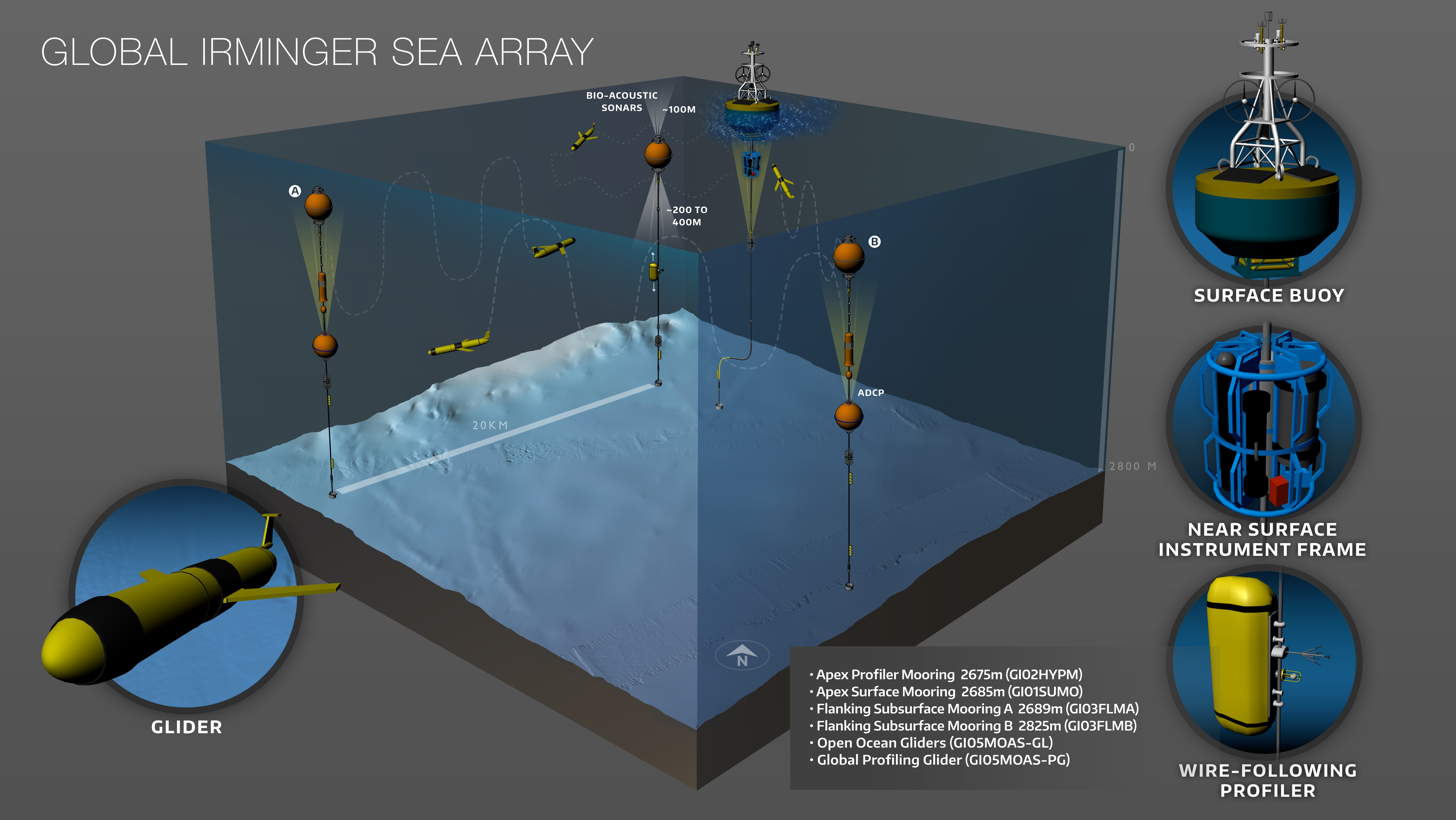
The Global Irminger Sea Array, located off the coast of Greenland, consists of three moorings. Credit: Center for Environmental Visualization, University of Washington.

===== Scientific Motivation =====
The Global Irminger Sea Array is located in the North Atlantic off the southern tip of Greenland. High winds and waves drive strong atmosphere-ocean interactions, including energy and gas exchanges that contribute to CO_{2} sequestration and the region's high biological productivity and fisheries. This area is also a site of North Atlantic Deep Water formation, important to the large-scale thermohaline circulation of ocean water.

===== Design =====
The Irminger Sea Array includes a set of four moorings. With a distance between moorings approximately ten times that of the water depth, the array is able to collect data on the mesoscale variability. One mooring site consists of a paired Global Surface and subsurface Global Hybrid Profiler mooring. The other two sites consist of subsurface Global Flanking Moorings. The water above the subsurface Global Hybrid Profiler Mooring is sampled by vertically profiling gliders. The water in and around the array is sampled by open-ocean gliders collecting data on spatial variability. Data from the gliders is transmitted wirelessly though an acoustic modem to the moorings and to a satellite for transmission to OOI's servers. Wireless reprogramming of the gliders and certain parts of the array is also possible to collect data on sudden events or environmental changes.

==== Global Station Papa Array ====
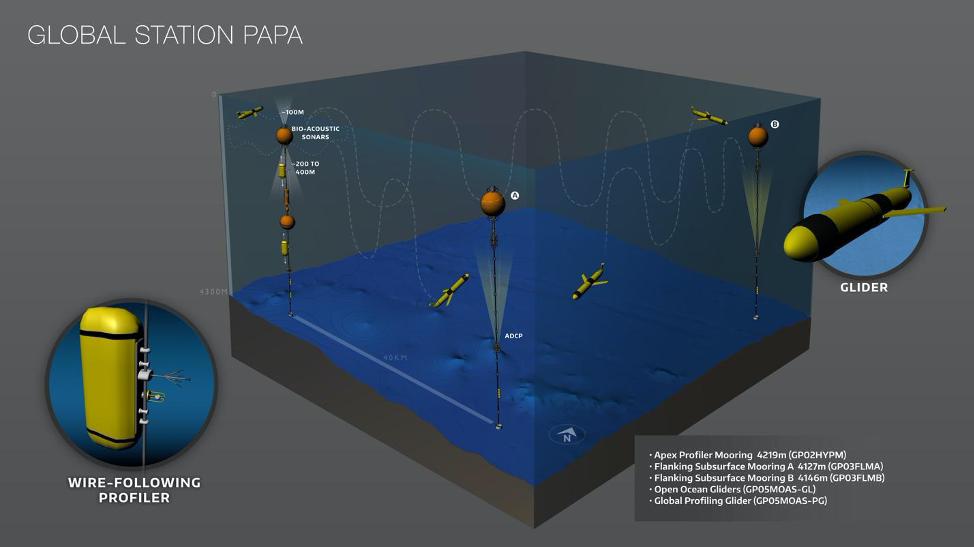
The Global Station Papa Array, located in the Gulf of Alaska, includes two subsurface flanking moorings and a surface mooring maintained by the NOAA Pacific Marine Environmental Laboratory. Credit: Center for Environmental Visualization, University of Washington.

===== Scientific Motivation =====
The Global Station Papa Array is located in the Gulf of Alaska North of the Coastal Endurance and Regional Cabled Arrays. The array is part of a larger network of observatories in the Northeast Pacific.

The three moorings of the array are co-located with the Ocean Station Papa surface buoy, which is maintained by the NOAA PMEL. This region is known for its productive fishery and low eddy variability, but it suffers from extreme vulnerability to ocean acidification. Continuous measurements of physical, biological, and chemical properties will help monitor mesoscale and large-scale patterns such as the Pacific Decadal Oscillation.

===== Design =====
The Global Station Papa Array is a set of three moorings. With a distance between moorings approximately ten times that of the water depth, the array is able to collect data on the mesoscale variability. Unlike the design of the Global Irminger Sea Array, the Global Station Papa array does not have an OOI Surface Mooring. Instead the subsurface Global Hybrid Profiler Mooring is co-located with the NOAA PMEL Surface Mooring at one corner of the triangle. Similar to the Global Irminger Sea Array, the other two corners are occupied by subsurface Global Flanking Moorings. The moorings are supplemented by open-ocean gliders that collect data on spatial variability in and around the array and vertically profiling gliders that sample the waters above the subsurface moorings. Data from the gliders is transmitted wirelessly though an acoustic modem from the moorings to a satellite for transmission to OOI's servers. Shore-based control of the gliders and certain parts of the array is used to collect data on sudden events or environmental changes.

=== Regional Cabled Array (RCA) ===
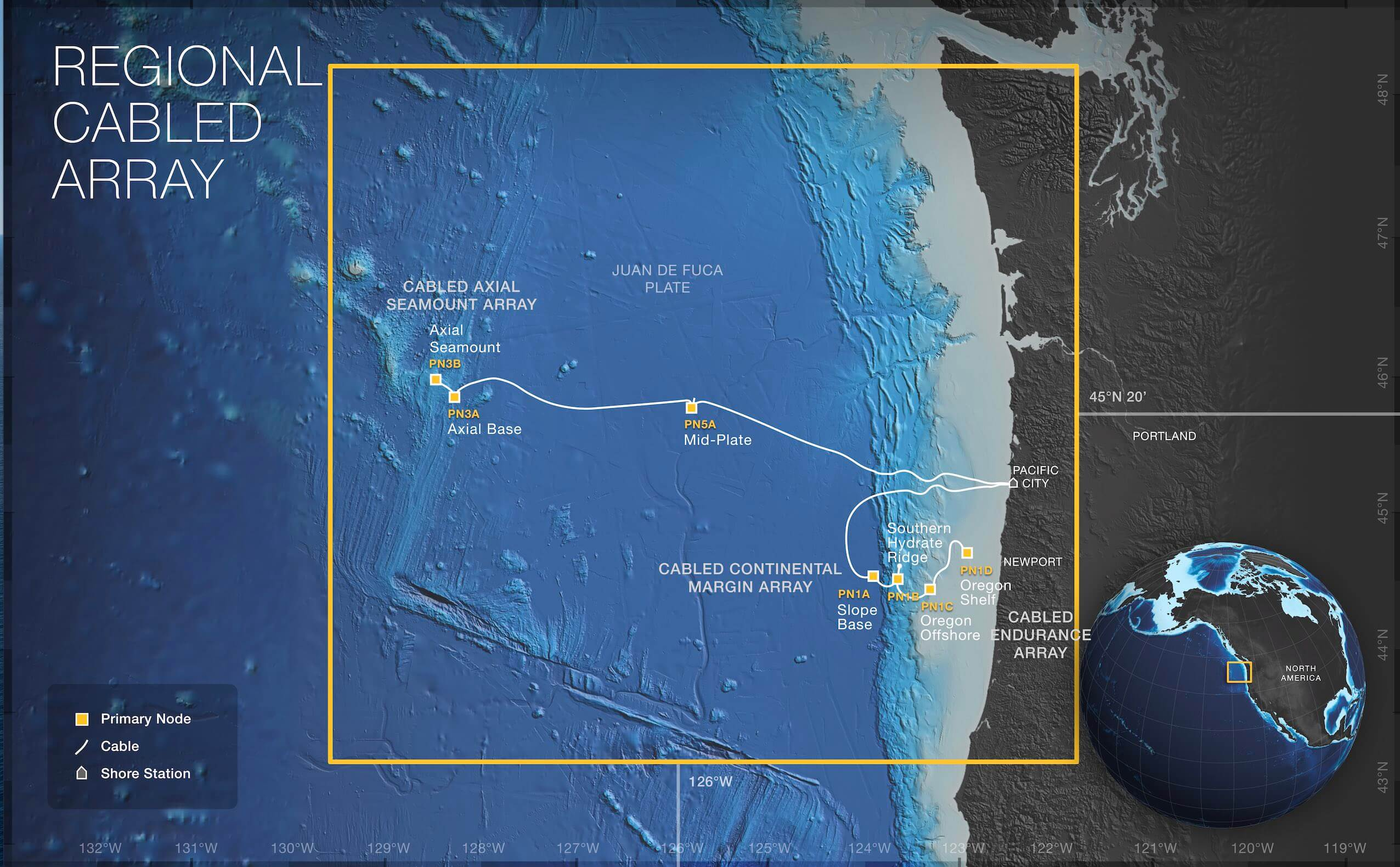
The OOI Regional Scale Nodes focus on two primary study sites (Hydrate Ridge and Axial Seamount) with the potential for future expansion to other sites. Credit: OOI Regional Scale Nodes program and Center for Environmental Visualization, University of Washington. Disclaimer: all data are subject to revision without notice.

The Regional Cabled Array (RCA) consists of cabled arrays of ocean observing sensors in the Northeast Pacific Ocean. The RCA crosses the Juan de Fuca plate, making the RCA the first U.S. ocean observatory to span a tectonic plate. Its observations allow for the in-depth study of volcanic activity, methane seeps, hydrothermal vents, and submarine earthquakes, as well as biological, chemical, and physical processes in the overlying water column.

The platforms and sensors are connected by approximately 900 kilometers (560 miles) of electro-optical cable. The design provides high power (10 kV, 8 kW) and bandwidth (10 GbE) to sensor arrays on the seafloor and throughout the water column using moorings with instrumented wire-following profilers, 200 m instrumented platforms and winched profilers. The cables provide two-way real-time communication between the seafloor and water column instrumentation and the shore station in Pacific City, Oregon. The RCA was installed and operated by the University of Washington.

Seven large seafloor substations (Primary Nodes) provide power and bandwidth to six sites that include those on the Oregon shelf and Offshore sites of the Endurance Array. Two additional sites span the continental margin to the base of the slope. The slope base site is located about 125 km west of Newport, Oregon and sits at a depth of 2900 m. It hosts both seafloor and instrumented profiling moorings and allows investigation of the variability and interactions of deep ocean waters, the California Current, and upwelling. It provides the foundation for making connections of transport up the slope and understanding the connection of deep to shallow processes acting at the Oregon Offshore Site.

Other sites in the RCA focus on Southern Hydrate Ridge, an area of massive sub-seafloor gas-hydrate deposits and fluxes of methane from the seafloor into the ocean, and Axial Seamount, the most magmatically robust volcano on the Juan de Fuca Ridge spreading center that erupted in April 2011.

The RCA complements the NEPTUNE cabled observatory that Ocean Networks Canada operates on the northern Juan de Fuca plate. Together these observatories enable long-term, plate-scale seafloor and ocean investigations in the Northeast Pacific.

==== Cabled Continental Margin Array ====
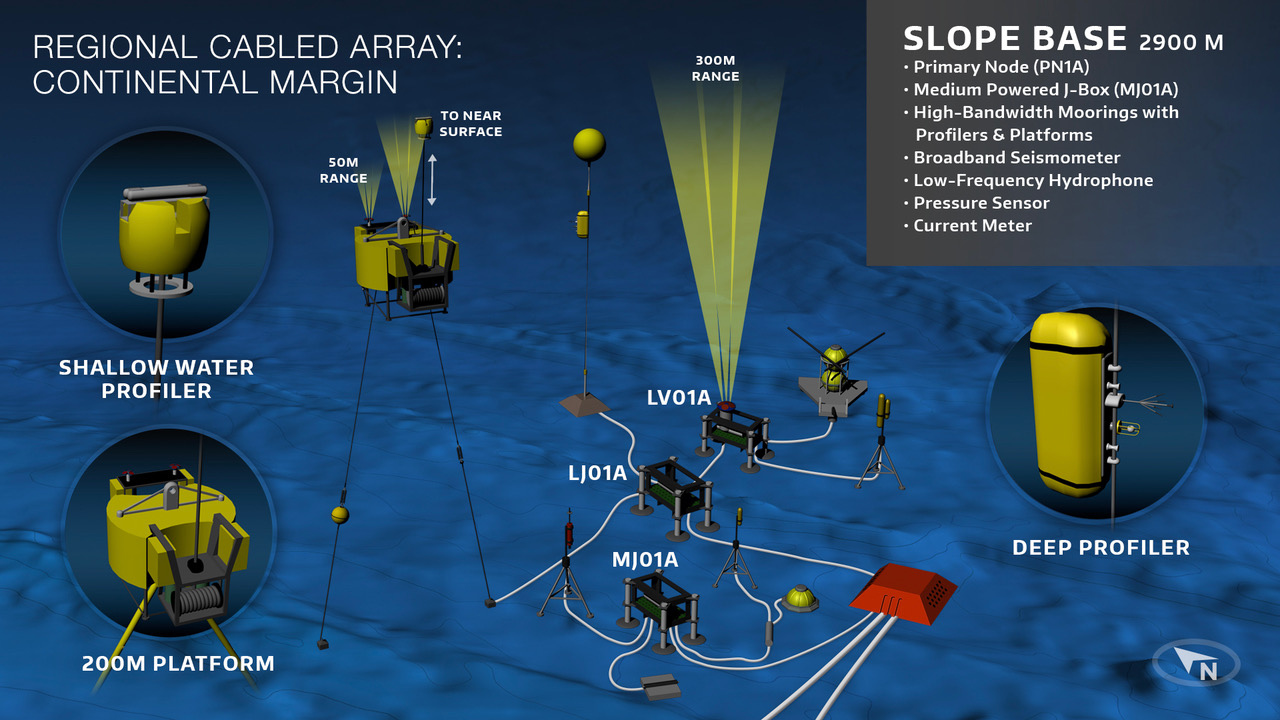
The OOI Continental Slope Base site is located off the coast of Oregon near the Cascadia Subduction zone. Credit: Center for Environmental Visualization, University of Washington.

===== Scientific Motivation =====
The Continental Margin portion of the RCA, located west of Newport, Oregon, focuses on observations of biogeochemical and physical oceanographic processes, coastal ecosystems, methane seeps/hydrate deposits, and seismic events along the Cascadia subduction zone west of Newport, Oregon.

Geophysical observations at the Slope Base site detect seismic and tsunami events associated with earthquakes along the Cascadia subduction zone and far field. This site also contains seafloor infrastructure and moorings with instrumented profilers designed to observe the deeper portions of the California Current, biogeochemical processes in the overlying water column including ocean acidification and thin layers, and topographic forcing of ocean waters induced by steep, rough topography.

Southern Hydrate Ridge is located in a region of buried deposits of methane hydrates and, more rarely, hydrates exposed on the seafloor. Methane-rich fluids and bubble plumes emitted from these seeps support dense benthic microbial communities and may provide a carbon source for the upper water column, supporting methane-oxidizing bacteria and larger organisms. As a potent greenhouse gas, it is also important to quantify methane released into the atmosphere. Destabilization of methane hydrates may also lead to slope failures, representing significant geohazards. New overview and quantification sonars funded by Germany through the Bremen University, for the first time, image all methane plumes emanating from Southern Hydrate Ridge.

===== Design =====
The Continental Margin Array includes infrastructure located on the continental slope and continental slope base that connects to the Endurance Array Oregon Line at the Offshore and Shelf sites. The Oregon slope base site is located by the Cascadia subduction zone, just off the continental slope. The Southern Hydrate Ridge site is located on the continental slope. Fiber-optic cables provide power and two-way communication to Junction Boxes, which house sensors and geophysical instruments such as seismometers and hydrophones. The three Junction Boxes at the Southern Hydrate Ridge include sensors that image and measure the methane hydrate plumes to help understand the movement and chemistry of these fluids. Junction Boxes paired with Cabled Deep and Shallow Profiler Moorings at the slope base site take observations throughout the water column from seafloor to ocean surface. Seafloor infrastructure includes a broadband seismometer and low frequency hydrophone to monitor local and far-field seismic events. All infrastructure is connected to the cable for power and real-time data flow coupled with live communications that permit event-response capabilities. Broadband hydrophones on the moorings from Axial to the Oregon Shelf site delineate mammal vocalizations, and sounds made by human activities.

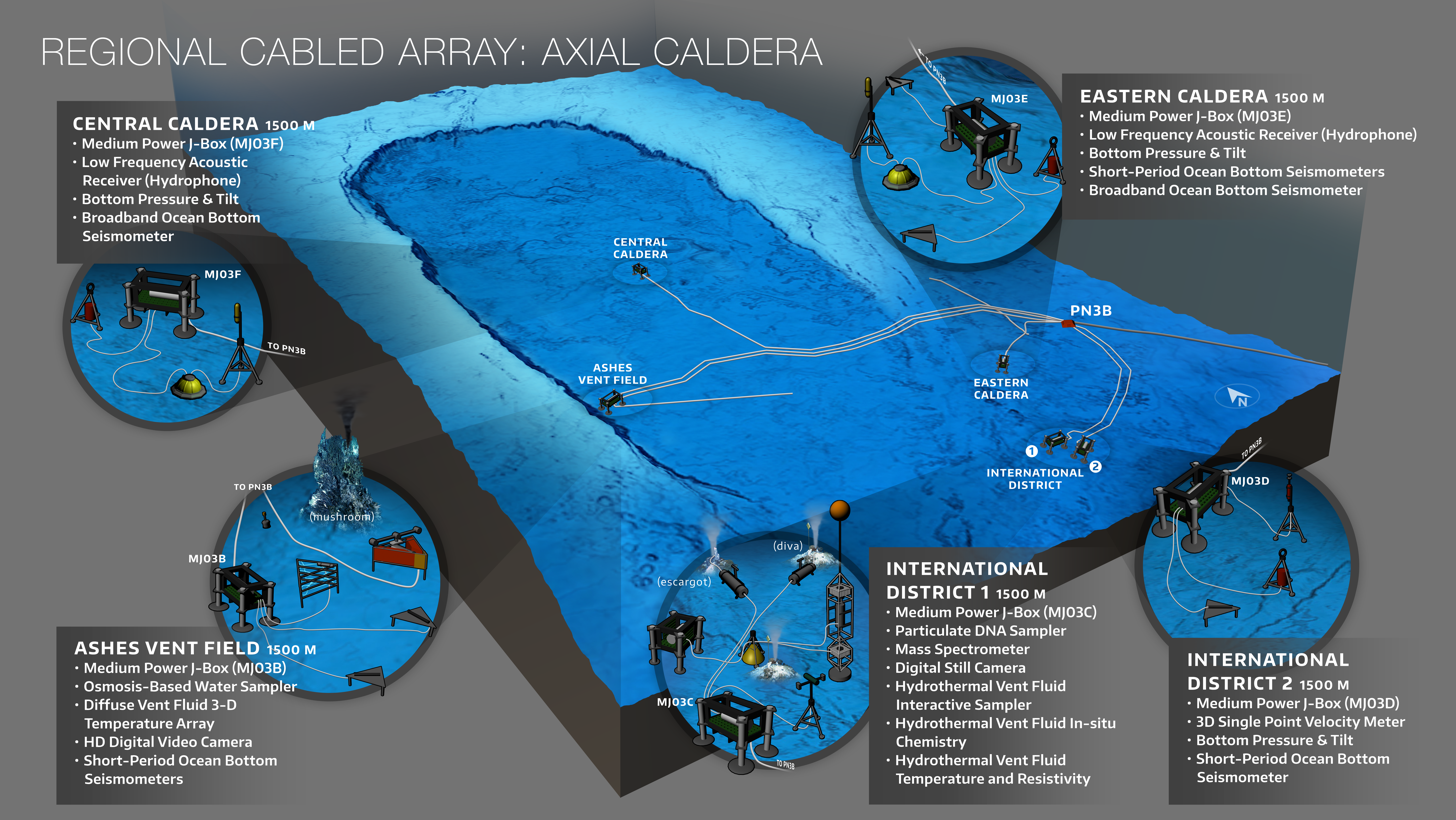
The Axial Seamount portion of the Regional Cabled Array includes infrastructure located at the base and inside the caldera of the Axial Seamount. Credit: Center for Environmental Visualization, University of Washington.

==== Cabled Axial Seamount Array ====
===== Scientific Motivation =====
The Axial Seamount portion of the RCA is located more than 500 km offshore and includes sites located within the caldera of Axial Seamount and at its base. The Axial Seamount is an active submarine volcano and on the Juan de Fuca Ridge spreading center.

The Axial Caldera site is located on the summit of the seamount 1500 m below the sea surface. The observatory at the Axial Seamount is the most advanced underwater volcanic observatory in the world. Instrumentation at the Cabled Axial Seamount Array facilitate study of seismic activity, volcanic eruptions, hydrothermal vents, formation and alteration of oceanic crust, and how the temperature and chemical changes associated with volcanic activity affect microbial and macrofaunal communities.

Infrastructure within the caldera has also been augmented by instruments with funding from NSF, the Office of Naval Research and NASA. These instruments span broad science investigations into crustal deformation at the volcano with follow-on studies focused on Cascadia Subduction Zone earthquakes. New instruments funded by NASA will also provide insights into the search for life on other planets.

The Axial Base site is an open-ocean environment where the North Pacific Current/California Current interacts with the subpolar gyre, making this site an important place where heat, salt, gasses, and biota are transported. Data collection aims to find connections between ocean dynamics, ecosystems, and climate at a range of scales, from basin to regional level.

===== Design =====
The Axial Caldera site has five medium-power junction boxes that contain data-collecting instruments. Seismometers and hydrophones collect geophysical data. Pressure-tilt devices detect changes in seafloor height and angle associated with the inflation and deflation of the magma chambers. Several types of instruments including cameras, sensors, and a 3D thermistor array are used to study the hydrothermal vents.

At the Axial Base site, junction boxes are paired with a Cabled Deep Profiler Mooring and a Cabled Shallow Profiler Mooring. The Cabled Deep Profiler Mooring contains a Wire-Following Profiler that samples the water column from 150 m below the surface to near bottom (up to 2600 m, depending on water depth). The Cabled Shallow Profiler Mooring samples shallow waters (200 m to just below the surface) with an instrumented science pod. Seafloor infrastructure, such as a broadband seismometer and low-frequency hydrophone, allows the RCA to monitor local and far-field seismic events.

Fiber-optic cables provide power and two-way real-time communication to the instruments from the shore. Live communication allows event response capabilities.

=== Cyberinfrastructure ===
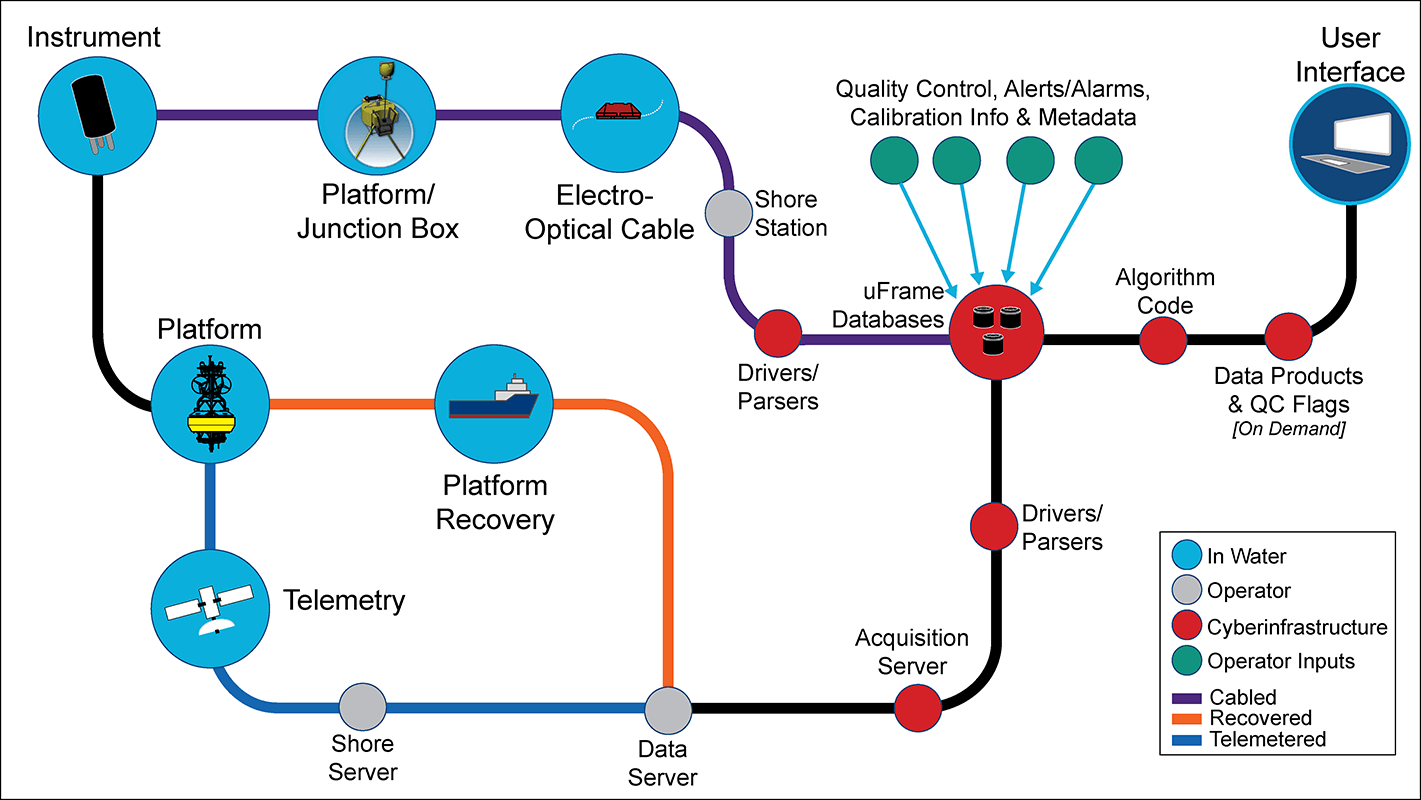
OOI's cyberinfrastructure manages and integrates the data collected from the instruments on the arrays. Credit: Woods Hole Oceanographic Institution

The OOI Cyberinfrastructure (CI) manages and integrates data from more than 800 instruments deployed across the five ongoing ocean arrays, linking the marine infrastructure to the global community of users.

Raw data from the arrays are transmitted to operations centers located in Pacific City (Regional Cabled Array), Oregon State University (uncabled instruments on the Pacific Coast), or Woods Hole Oceanographic Institution (uncabled instruments on the Atlantic coast). The data are then uploaded to the OOI CI.

The OOI CI has been in operation since 2013. As of May 2020, it has collected and curated 36 terabytes of data and has served over 189 million requests to users from more than 100 countries. All raw and processed datasets are made available online to users and a full archive of all raw datasets is stored in multiple locations. OOI data quality control procedures were designed with the goal of meeting the IOOS Quality Assurance of Real Time Ocean Data (QARTOD) standards.

The OOI Data Explorer is the primary tool to access datasets. Previous data from the OOI Data Portal is in the process of being transferred to the Data Explorer portal. Access to data and subsets of data is also available through the Raw Data Archive, the Analytical Data Archive, the OOI Environmental Research Division Data Access Program (ERDDAP) server, and the OOI Machine to Machine (M2M) API Interface.
