= Coordination Group for Meteorological Satellites =

- Abbreviation: CGMS
- Formation: September 19, 1972
- Type: Non-binding international charter
- Headquarters: Permanent secretariat at EUMETSAT, Darmstadt, Germany
- Website: www.cgms-info.org

The Coordination Group for Meteorological Satellites (CGMS) is an international organization created in 1972 to coordinate the satellite systems that support global operational meteorology.

== Description ==
CGMS came into being on 19 September 1972, when representatives of the European Space Research Organisation (since 1975 the European Space Agency), Japan, the United States of America, and observers from the World Meteorological Organisation (WMO) and the Joint Planning Staff for the Global Atmospheric Research Programme, met in Washington to discuss questions of compatibility among geostationary meteorological satellites. Since the formation the mandate of CGMS has been extended to include Low Earth Orbit meteorological satellites and to cover other areas of operational space-based environmental monitoring as well as space weather observations from satellites.

The objectives of CGMS are formally laid down in its charter

As of 2021 CGMS has as members 14 national and intergovernmental space agencies, as well as the World Meteorological Organisation and the Intergovernmental Oceanographic Commission:

CGMS Members
Organisation	Full Name	Year of Accession
CMA	China Meteorological Administration	1989
CNES	Centre National d’Etudes Spatiales	2004
CNSA	China National Space Administration	2006
ESA	The European Space Agency	2003
EUMETSAT	European Organisation for the Exploitation of Meteorological Satellites	1987
IMD	India Meteorological Department	1979
IOC-UNESCO	Intergovernmental Oceanographic Commission - UNESCO	2001
ISRO	Indian Space Research Organisation	2015
JAXA	Japan Aerospace Exploration Agency	2003
JMA	Japan Meteorological Agency	1972
KMA	Korea Meteorological Administration	2005
NASA	National Aeronautics and Space Administration	2003
NOAA	National Oceanic and Atmospheric Administration	1972
ROSCOSMOS	Russian Federal Space Agency	2003
ROSHYDROMET	Federal Service for Hydrometeorology and Environmental Monitoring of Russia	1973
WMO	World Meteorological Organization	1973

== CGMS activities ==
CGMS coordinates the operational satellite systems of its members in an end-to-end fashion as required to facilitate and develop shared access to and use of satellite data and products in various application area, including operational meteorology. The activities cover:

- Operational Continuity and Contingency Planning
- Coordination of Satellite Systems, Frequencies and Operations
- Coordination of Data Access and End User Support
- Enhancement of the quality of satellite-derived data and Products
- Monitoring of Climate including Greenhouse Gases
- Space Weather Monitoring
- Outreach and training activities

The medium term targets of CGMS are reflected in the CGMS High-Level Priority Plan. The HLPP is a rolling 5-year plan, revised annually by the CGMS plenary session.
