= Ocean Networks Canada =

University research facility in British Columbia, Canada

- Established: 2007
- President: Kate Moran
- Staff: 150 Approx.
- Location: Victoria, BC, Canada
- Website: www.oceannetworks.ca www.uvic.ca

Ocean Networks Canada is a research and ocean observing facility hosted and owned by the University of Victoria. It is managed by the not-for profit ONC Society.

ONC operates observatories in the deep ocean and coastal waters of Canada's three coasts, the Arctic, the Pacific and the Atlantic, gathering biological, chemical, geological and physical data. ONC operates the NEPTUNE and VENUS cabled ocean observatories in the northeast Pacific Ocean and the Salish Sea. Additionally, Ocean Networks Canada operates smaller community-based observatories offshore from Cambridge Bay, Nunavut, Campbell River, Kitamaat Village and Digby Island. Over 200 gigabytes of data are collected every day.

The NEPTUNE observatory is situated off the west coast of Vancouver Island in Barkley Sound, along the Cascadia subduction zone, on the Cascadia Basin abyssal plain, and on the Endeavour segment of the Juan de Fuca Ridge.

Altogether, the system includes 3 observatories, 5 shore stations, 850+ km of seafloor backbone cables, 11 instrumented sites, 32 instrument platforms, 6 mobile instrument platforms, 400+ instruments and over 2000 scientific sensors deployed.

Scientific topics of study that are enabled by data from these observatories include Arctic oceanography, deep-sea biodiversity, marine ecosystem function, marine forensics, gas hydrates, hydrothermal vents, marine mammals, sediment and benthic dynamics and tsunami studies.
