= NEPTUNE =

Underwater ocean observatory

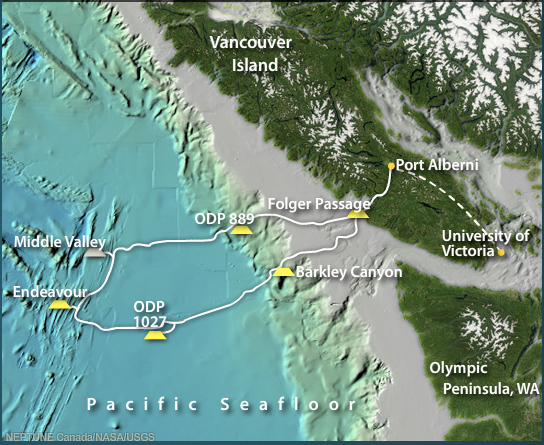
- Alternative names: NEPTUNE
- Organization: University of Victoria
- Location: British Columbia, Canada
- Website: www.oceannetworks.ca/observatories/pacific

The NEPTUNE Ocean Observatory project is part of Ocean Networks Canada which is a University of Victoria initiative. NEPTUNE is the world's first regional-scale underwater ocean observatory that plugs directly into the Internet. NEPTUNE is the largest installation on the Ocean Networks Canada network of ocean observatories. Since December 2009, it has allowed people to "surf" the seafloor while ocean scientists run deep-water experiments from labs and universities around the world. Along with its sister project, VENUS, NEPTUNE offers a unique approach to ocean science. Traditionally, ocean scientists have relied on infrequent ship cruises or space-based satellites to carry out their research, while the NEPTUNE project uses a remotely operated crawler.

== Overview ==
NEPTUNE is an acronym for North-east Pacific Time-series Undersea Networked Experiments. The North-East Pacific is home to the Juan de Fuca Plate, which is the smallest of Earth's 12 tectonic plates. Its small size and close proximity to the coast gives NEPTUNE Canada an opportunity to observe tectonic processes. NEPTUNE Canada is built to provide continuous observations for 25 years. The time-series data gathered will allow scientists to study long-term changes over the life of the project. Instruments comprising the undersea observatory will operate at depths ranging from 17 to 2,660 m. Hundreds of instruments have been connected to the Internet by way of shielded cables carrying both power and fibre-optic communication lines. A database will archive and provide networked access to all archived data. Taking advantage of this platform, scientists collaborating with NEPTUNE are expected to conduct thousands of unique experiments over the life of the project.

== Status ==
- In 2007, NEPTUNE Canada laid approximately 800 km of power transmission and fibre optic communication cables over the northern part of the Juan de Fuca tectonic plate off the west coast of Vancouver Island in British Columbia. The University of Victoria hosts both the NEPTUNE Canada and VENUS projects along with the Data Management and Archiving System that is responsible for all data processing, from data acquisition to archiving to providing near real-time web access.
- The NEPTUNE project was selected as one of the five most significant science projects of the year in 2008 from The Economist.
- In June 2008, the NEPTUNE project received and successfully tested the world's first "Internet-operated deep sea crawler", created by a team of ocean scientists at Bremen's Jacobs University, will help researchers measure conditions such as temperature, salinity, methane content and sediment characteristics at the seafloor. The crawler "crawls" on dual tractor treads, which allow a full range of forward, backward and turning movement. Including its titanium frame, drive motors, sealed electronics chambers, wiring, lights, HD video camera, and sensors, the unit's out-of-water weight is 275 kg. With syntactic foam flotation blocks attached, this is reduced to an in-water weight of 40 kg. One unique feature is its control interface, which plugs directly into the Web. Interested people will be able to tune in to a live sea floor crawl on the NEPTUNE website. The crawler was named "Wally" (after the fictional Pixar robot WALL-E) and explored regions of the ocean floor containing methane clathrates.
- Late September 2008 NEPTUNE Canada's first fully instrumented instrument platform was deployed by ROPOS from the Canadian Coast Guard Ship John P Tully in Saanich Inlet and connected to the VENUS Saanich Inlet node. This platform was recovered in early 2009 and reconfigured for deployment at Endeavour Ridge during the summer of 2010.
- A similar observatory will be installed off the west coast of the states of Washington and Oregon. The University of Washington will lead the Regional Scale Nodes component of the NSF's Ocean Observatories Initiative.
- July–October 2009, the main science nodes were installed along with 11 instrument platforms and over 60 scientific instruments.
- 8 December 2009, NEPTUNE Canada's official operational launch was celebrated with a Go-live Event.
- March 2010, Robert Gagosian, president and chief executive officer of the Consortium for Ocean Leadership in Washington, D.C., and Martin Taylor, president and chief executive officer of Ocean Networks Canada (umbrella organization for both NEPTUNE Canada and VENUS), signed a memorandum of understanding pledging to work closely together as they manage and operate ocean observing systems.
- May 2010, instrument platforms were refurbished and new instruments installed during an installation and maintenance cruise aboard the Canadian Coast Guard Ship John P Tully.
- Fall 2010, new cables were laid and instruments installed as NEPTUNE Canada extended its network to the Endeavour Hydrothermal Vents. These installations were accomplished with the help of the crews of the RV Thomas G. Thompson, the Canadian Coast Guard Ship John P Tully and CSSF/ROPOS.
- These components are connected on a backbone of thick and insulated cable called a spur cable that has two separated lines for transmitting the data in opposite directions. The instruments transmit the data either clockwise or counter clockwise within a 2 by 2 Gbit/s data flow. Since the primary purpose of the system is data collection and analysis, the available instruments generate data of various size and nature. The collected data is then transmitted on the spur cable passing through all the routers that are on one of the best alternative paths of the data flow.

== Data channels and connections ==
In NEPTUNE Canada network traffic, four network channels are defined in the network description file based on the data provided. The first channel provides a ten Gbit/s data rate between UVIC (University of Victoria) DMAS (Data Management and Archive Station) and a shore station in Port Alberni. This channel has the largest volume in the system, and is located between the edge of the network of the system and the main receiver UVIC DMAS.

The shore station is linked to the first branching unit followed by five other branching units that are also linked to other branching units. This solid connection spur cable forms a ring-shaped SONET network that has two cables in order to control the network traffic in two directions. A two-by-two Gbit/s data channel is implemented on the spur cable, and each branching unit is connected to a regional node station. The connection between node stations and branching units provide one Gbit/s using a fiber-optic cable. Six node stations split the backhaul into six regions and the network behavior in between each regions' devices is identical. Similar to the connections between node stations and branching units, node stations are linked to junction boxes at one Gbit/s.

Junction boxes can be linked to instruments and other junction boxes with different data channels. All the network channels transmit the data with 0.1 delay rate. Junction box to junction box and instrument to instrument connections are implemented with either one Gbit/s or one hundred Gbit/s data rates. More than ten components cannot be connected to a single junction box. Instruments can be linked to junction boxes or any other instrument through either data channel. The instruments are the final spots of the regional network branches. The data flows from the instruments through the edge of each regional branch toward UVIC DMAS by following a secure and shortest path, as configured by the network configurator used by NEPTSim.

== See also ==
- VENUS
