= Hikurangi (disambiguation) =

Hikurangi may refer to:

- Hikurangi, a settlement in Northland, New Zealand
- Hikurangi River, a river in Northland, New Zealand
- Hikurangi Trough, an ocean trough off the East Coast of the North Island of New Zealand
- Hikurangi Plateau, an oceanic plateau off the East Coast of the North Island of New Zealand
- Hikurangi, the traditional Te Kawerau ā Maki name for West Auckland, New Zealand

== Peaks ==
- Mount Hikurangi (Gisborne District), a mountain near Ruatoria on the East Coast, New Zealand
- Mount Hikurangi (Northland), a mountain near Kaikohe in Northland, New Zealand
- Hikurangi, a cone near Taumarunui, New Zealand
