= Taheke River =

Coordinates: 35.665356°S 174.450460°E

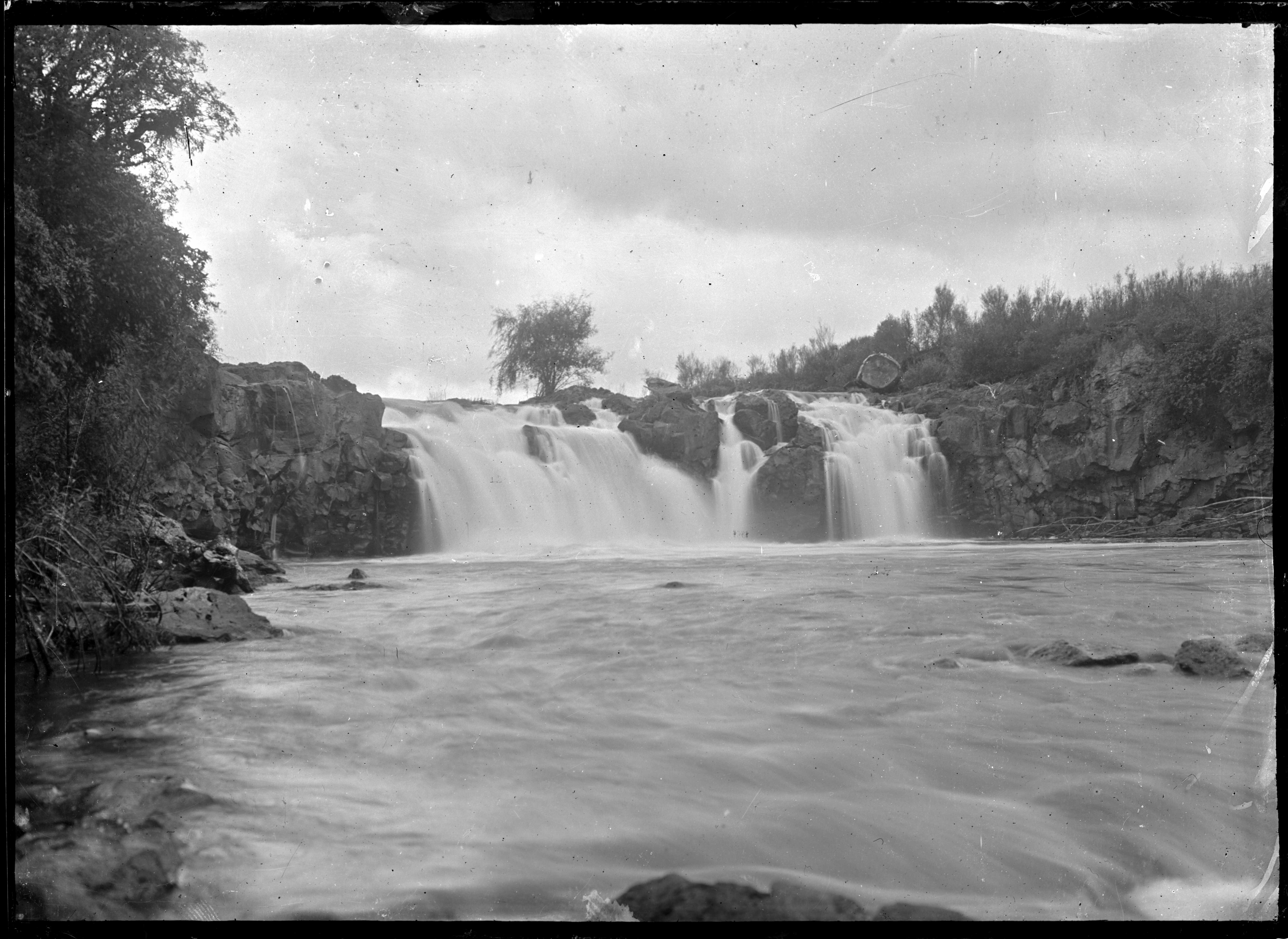
- Taheke Falls (now Waima River) in 1918

Location
- Country: New Zealand

Physical characteristics
- Mouth
  - location: Waitangi River

There are two Taheke Rivers in the Northland Region of New Zealand's North Island.

One flows north from its origins in hills to the east of Whangārei reaching the Waitangi River to form the Horahora River, which runs into Ngunguru Bay.

Another Taheke River starts at the confluence of the Punakitere and Ōtaua Rivers, near Taheke, and flows about 8 km (5.0 mi) to become the Waimā River, which runs into Hokianga Harbour.

== See also ==
- List of rivers of New Zealand
