= A Mile in My Shoes =

A Mile in My Shoes may refer to:

- "A Mile in My Shoes" (The Fairly OddParents), an episode of The Fairly OddParents
- A Mile in My Shoes (film), a 2016 Moroccan drama film
- A Mile in My shoes (podcast), spin-off of the Empathy Museum
