= Horahora River =

Coordinates: 35°40′S 174°31′E

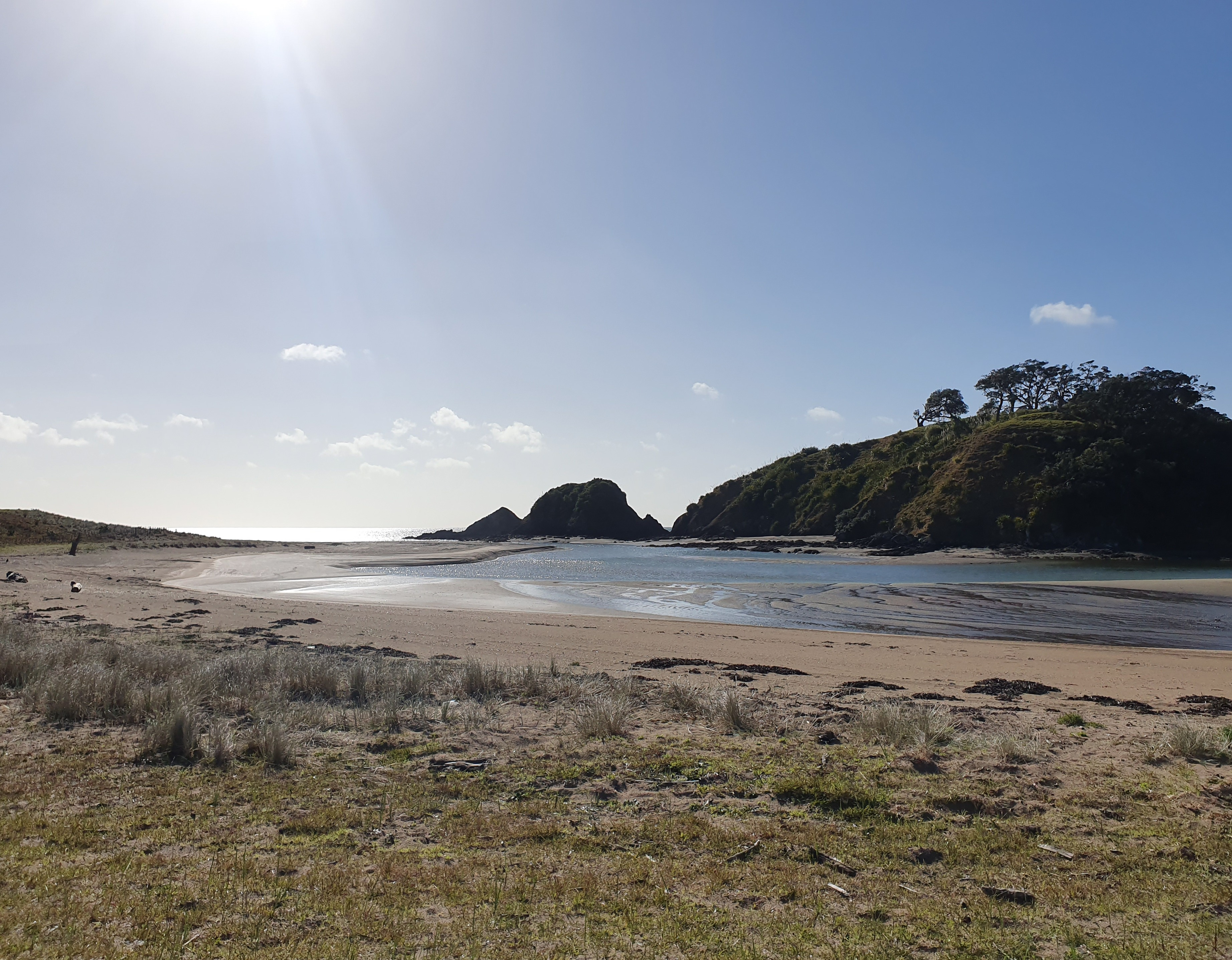

Location
- Country: New Zealand

Physical characteristics
- Source
  - location: Waitangi River and Taheke River
- Mouth
  - location: Ngunguru Bay
- Length: 5 km (3.1 mi)

The Horahora River is a short river of Northland, New Zealand. It is formed from the confluence of the Waitangi River and Taheke River, which meet close to the Pacific Ocean coast 12 kilometres (7.5 mi) northeast of Whangārei. It flows into the Pacific at Ngunguru Bay, three kilometres south of Ngunguru.

== See also ==
- List of rivers of New Zealand
