= Roman Krznaric =

Australian philosopher

- Born: 1970 (age 55–56); Sydney, Australia
- Spouse: Kate Raworth
- Children: 2
- Relatives: Sophie Raworth (sister-in-law)

Philosophical work
- Notable works: The Good Ancestor, Empathy, The Wonderbox, Carpe Diem Regained, and How to Find Fulfilling Work
- Website: romankrznaric.com

Roman Krznaric (/krɪzˈnærɪk/ kriz-NARR-ik; born 1970) is an Australian-born social philosopher, whose books focus on the power of ideas to create change. His international bestsellers, including The Good Ancestor and Empathy, have been published in more than 25 languages. He is a Senior Research Fellow at the Centre for Eudaimonia and Human Flourishing at Linacre College, University of Oxford and the founder of the world's first Empathy Museum. His latest book, History for Tomorrow: Inspiration from the Past for the Future of Humanity, explores what we can learn from the last 1000 years of global history to tackle urgent issues ranging from the climate crisis to the risks of artificial intelligence.

Krznaric is also a Research Fellow of the Long Now Foundation and member of the Club of Rome. Particularly known for his interdisciplinary work on empathy and long-term thinking, his writings have been widely influential amongst political and ecological campaigners, education reformers, social entrepreneurs and designers. He was named by The Observer as one of Britain's leading popular philosophers.

== Education and early career ==
Krznaric was born in Sydney, Australia in 1970, and attended secondary school in Hong Kong. After studying philosophy, politics and economics at Pembroke College, Oxford University, he completed a master's degree in Latin American politics at the Institute of Latin American Studies at the University of London, then a PhD in the Department of Government at the University of Essex. His doctoral thesis explored the political, social and economic thought of Guatemala's oligarchy.

Krznaric did human rights work with indigenous refugees in Guatemala, then taught politics and sociology at Essex University, the University of Cambridge and City University, London. After leaving academia, he was project director at The Oxford Muse, a cultural organisation established by the historian Theodore Zeldin to create conversations across social divides. Krznaric and Zeldin co-edited two books, Guide to an Unknown City (2003) and Guide to an Unknown University (2006).

In 2008, he was one of the founding faculty members of The School of Life in London, where he designed and taught courses on work, politics and love until 2012. Since then he has dedicated himself full-time to writing.

== Books ==
=== History for Tomorrow (2024) ===
In History for Tomorrow: Inspiration from the Past for the Future of Humanity, Krznaric delves into the last 1000 years of world history and asks what inspiration it offers for tackling ten urgent problems facing humanity in the 21st century, including climate change, hyperconsumerism, inequality, democracy and risks from AI and genetic engineering. While his last book, The Good Ancestor, explores humankind's relationship with the future, the new book looks at our relationship with the past. Rather than simply highlighting warnings from history, Krznaric searches for positive examples of what went right alongside cautionary tales of what went wrong. The book reveals how, time and again, societies have risen up, often against the odds, to tackle challenges and overcome crises. The science fiction author Kim Stanley Robinson has described the book as 'an amazing feat of synthesis and imagination'.

=== The Good Ancestor (2020) ===
Like his book Empathy, Krznaric's The Good Ancestor: How to Think Long Term in a Short-Term World, takes a key contemporary idea – in this case long-term thinking – and unpacks its intellectual history, conceptual underpinnings and practical applications. Krznaric argues that humankind, especially in the wealthy countries of the Global North, has 'colonised the future', treating it as a place where we dump ecological degradation and technological risk. The book reveals six ways we can become better long-term thinkers to help tackle issues ranging from the climate crisis and the risks of artificial intelligence to planning for the next pandemic on the horizon and confronting racial injustice that gets passed on from generation to generation. The book has had widespread public impact, including being the basis for legal rulings on intergenerational rights and climate justice. Its core ideas have also been explored in Krznaric's TED talk, and in the documentary Time Rebels, made for Dutch public television.

=== Carpe Diem Regained (2017) ===
In Carpe Diem Regained: The Vanishing Art of Seizing the Day, Krznaric reveals how the ancient ideal carpe diem, originally popularised by the Roman poet Horace, has been hijacked today by forces such as consumer culture, social media and the mindfulness industry. Krznaric has described the book as an attempt to rewrite existentialism for the twenty-first century. Krznaric emphasises how an apparently individualistic ideal such as seizing the day also has a collective potential to become a force for socio-political transformation, suggesting that tackling issues such as the global ecological crisis requires a ‘carpamus diem’ (‘let’s seize the day together’) mentality.

=== Empathy (2014) ===
Krznaric's book Empathy: Why It Matters and How to Get It (originally titled Empathy: A Handbook for Revolution), takes the long-established psychological concept of empathy and reveals how it can be a force for social and political transformation, drawing on examples ranging from the rise of the movement against slavery and the slave trade in Britain in the late eighteenth century to contemporary grass-roots peace building projects in the Middle East.

In the book, Krznaric draws a distinction between affective empathy (empathy as a shared emotional response) and cognitive empathy (empathy as the capacity to step into the shoes of others and understand their worldview), arguing that the latter has a particularly important role to play in social change. This theme was explored in his RSA Animate video, The Power of Outrospection.

The book inspired Krznaric's creation of the Empathy Museum, an international arts organisation, and the digital Empathy Library. Krznaric is widely recognised as one of the world's leading thinkers about empathy.

=== How to Find Fulfilling Work (2012) ===
Krznaric's book How to Find Fulfilling Work extols the virtues of being a “wide achiever” rather than a “high achiever,” arguing that becoming a generalist is a key skill for navigating today's uncertain and insecure workplace.

=== The Wonderbox (2011) ===
The Wonderbox: Curious Histories of How to Live (published in the US as How Should We Live?) explores what history can teach us about tackling the challenges of personal life: What can we learn about love from the Ancient Greeks? What might the Renaissance teach us about confronting death? How has our approach to work, time and consumerism transformed since the industrial revolution? The book was inspired by Goethe's dictum, 'He who cannot draw on three thousand years is living from hand to mouth'.

=== How Change Happens (2007) ===
In addition to academic articles on democratic governance and Latin American politics, Krznaric is the author of the Oxfam report How Change Happens: Interdisciplinary Perspectives for Human Development (2007) as well as reports on empathy and development issues for Friends of the Earth and the United Nations Development Programme.

=== The First Beautiful Game (2006) ===
He is also the author of The First Beautiful Game: Stories of Obsession in Real Tennis, a book that uses a combination of oral history and personal memoir to explore the medieval sport of real tennis. Krznaric is one of the world's top amateur players of the sport.

== Personal life ==
Krznaric is married to the British economist Kate Raworth, author of Doughnut Economics: Seven Ways to Think Like a 21st-Century Economist. They have boy-girl twins and live in Oxford. He is a top ranked amateur player of real tennis.

== Bibliography ==
- History for Tomorrow: Inspiration from the Past for the Future of Humanity (2024)
- What The Rich Don't Tell The Poor: Conversations with Guatemalan Oligarchs (2022)
- The Good Ancestor: How to Think Long Term in a Short Term World (2020)
- Carpe Diem Regained: The Vanishing Art of Seizing the Day (2017)
- Empathy: Why It Matters and How to Get It (2014)
- How to Find Fulfilling Work (2012)
- The Wonderbox: Curious Histories of How to Live (2011)
- The First Beautiful Game: Stories of Obsession in Real Tennis (2006)
