= Mount Hikurangi (Northland) =

Mountain in the country of New Zealand

Coordinates: 35.5396°S 173.9144°E

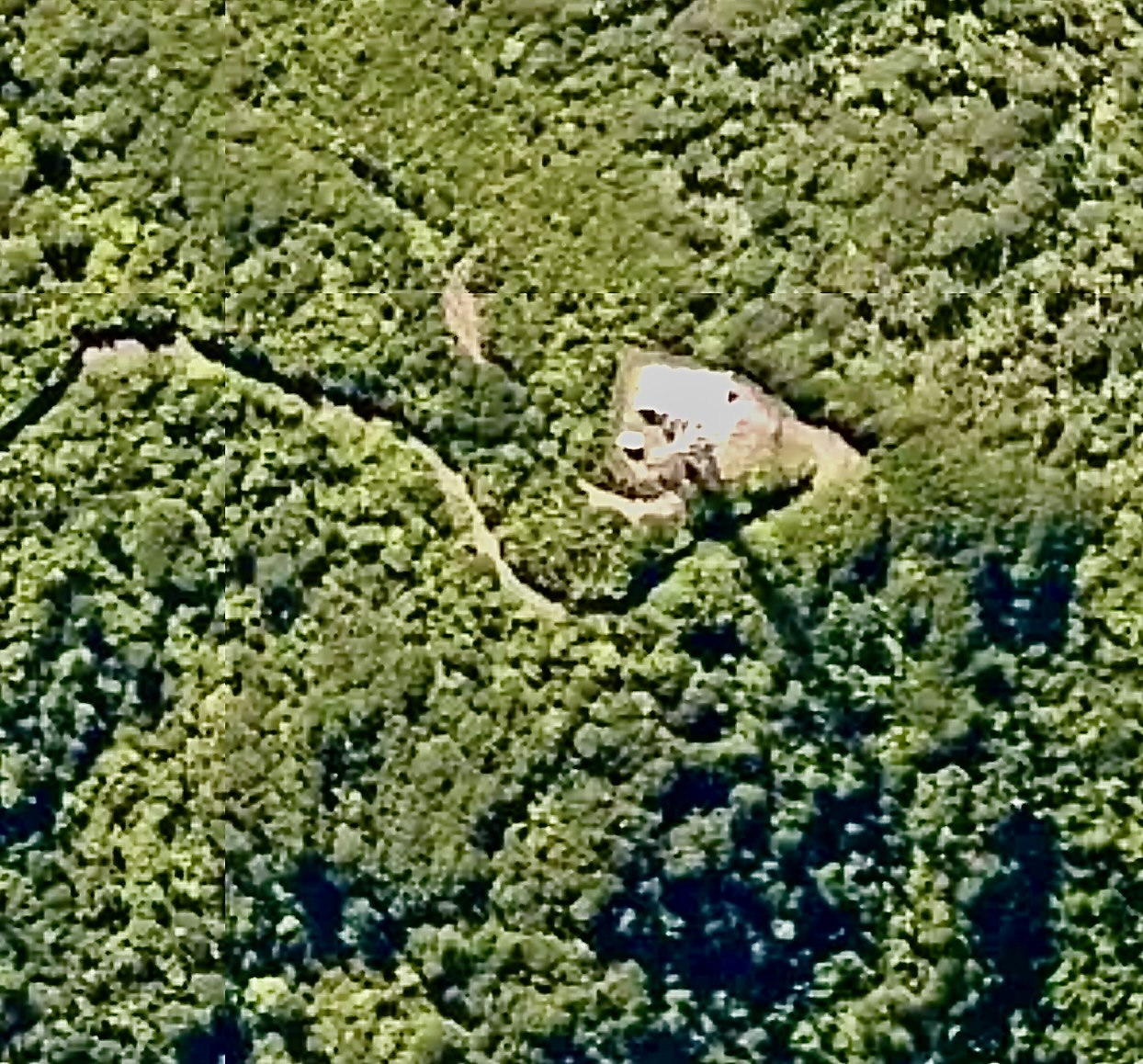
Hikurangi aerial view in 2023

Although not as prominent as its eastern namesake, Northland's Mount Hikurangi is also of note. At 625 m (2,051 ft), this peak overlooks central Northland and is a prominent peak on the skyline at the Bay of Islands, the area of the first permanent European settlement in New Zealand.

Hikurangi's height is shown on LINZ maps as 631 m (2,070 ft) and 626 m (2,054 ft) in a regional plan. It forms the upper catchments of the Awarua, Kaikou and Punakitere rivers. There is a communications mast on the summit, serviced by a track through the bush. The mountain is formed of Cretaceous-Paleocene ophiolitic volcanics. It forms part of Tokawhero Forest, which has been logged. The secondary kauri-podocarp-broadleaved forest is now dominated by totara and kānuka, with kauri, tōwai, taraire, kahikatea, rewarewa, rimu, pukatea, northern rata, tanekaha and miro scattered emergents. Several uncommon species live in the bush, including Punctidae snails.

There are also two other hills in the area to the north and west of Whangārei with the same name; a 365 m (1,198 ft) volcanic cone near Hikurangi and a 173 m (568 ft) hill to the south of the Hikurangi River valley. Also in Northland, a 179 m (587 ft) Hikurangi rises to the south of Taipā.
