= Planetary management =

Intentional global-scale management of Earth's ecosystem

Planetary management is intentional global-scale management of Earth's biological, chemical and physical processes and cycles (water, carbon, nitrogen, sulfur, phosphorus, and others). Planetary management also includes managing humanity's influence on planetary-scale processes. Effective planetary management aims to prevent destabilisation of Earth's climate, protect biodiversity and maintain or improve human well-being. More specifically, it aims to benefit society and the global economy, and safeguard the ecosystem services upon which humanity depends – global climate, freshwater supply, food, energy, clean air, fertile soil, pollinators, and so on.

Because of the sheer complexity and enormous scope of the task, it remains to be seen whether planetary management is a feasible paradigm for maintaining global sustainability. The concept currently has defenders and critics on both sides: environmentalist David W. Orr questions whether such a task can be accomplished with human help and technology or without first examining the underlying human causes, while geographer Vaclav Smil acknowledges that "the idea of planetary management may seem preposterous to many, but at this time in history there is no rational alternative".

== Background ==
Planetary boundaries according to Rockström et al. 2009 and Steffen et al. 2015. The green areas represent human activities that are within safe margins, the yellow areas represent human activities that may or may not have exceeded safe margins, the red areas represent human activities that have exceeded safe margins, and the gray areas with red question marks represent human activities for which safe margins have not yet been determined.

The term has been around in science fiction novels since the 1970s. In 2004, the International Geosphere-Biosphere Programme published "Global Change and the Earth System, a planet under pressure." The publication's executive summary concluded: "An overall, comprehensive, internally consistent strategy for stewardship of the Earth system is required". It stated that a research goal is to define and maintain a stable equilibrium in the global environment. In 2009, the planetary boundaries concept was published in the science journal Nature. The paper identifies nine boundaries in the Earth system. Remaining within these nine boundaries, the authors suggest, may safeguard the current equilibrium.

In 2007, France called for UNEP to be replaced by a new and more powerful organization, the United Nations Environment Organization. The rationale was that UNEP's status as a programme, rather than an organization in the tradition of the World Health Organization or the World Meteorological Organization, weakened it to the extent that it was no longer fit for purpose given current knowledge of the state of Earth. The call was backed by 46 countries. Notably, the top five emitters of greenhouse gases failed to support the call.

Planetary Ecosystems Accounting model supports that quantifying both emissions sequestration potential as well as emissions productions can provide a better overview on how to render better informed decisions regarding natural ecosystems.

== Comparison with other environmental worldviews ==
Together with planetary management, stewardship and environmental wisdom are different ways to manage the Earth or "environmental worldviews".

In particular:

- Planetary management focus its attention on humans needs and wants, while stewardship aim at the benefit of humans, organisms and ecosystems of the Earth: in other words, planetary management considers humans as the most important species in the Earth, while stewardship and environmental wisdom consider all the species at the same level of importance.
- To accomplish its scope, planetary management relies on technology and innovation (as stewardship and spaceship-earth worldview), while environmental wisdom relies on the lesson learned from nature.

== See also ==
- 2030 Agenda
- Brundtland Commission
- Climate engineering
- Commission on Sustainable Development
- Earth systems engineering and management
- Earth system science
- Environmental management
- Geo engineering
- Global change
- Global governance
- Holocene extinction
- Macro-engineering
- Megaproject
- Planetary boundaries
- Planetary engineering
- Steady-state economy
- The Venus Project
