= Punakitere River =

River in the Northland Region of New Zealand's North Island

Coordinates: 35°27′S 173°39′E

Location
- Country: New Zealand

Physical characteristics
- Source
  - location: Mount Hikurangi
  - elevation: 631 m (2,070 ft)
- Mouth
  - location: Waima River
- Length: 43 km (27 mi)
- Basin size: 325 km^{2} (125 sq mi)

The Punakitere River is a river of the Northland Region of New Zealand's North Island. It is a tributary of the Taheke River, which forms the Waimā River, though it is longer than the Waimā itself. The Punakitere is polluted, especially with e-coli and phosphorus, and has its origins in several streams which flow through and to the south of Kaikohe, as well as from Mount Hikurangi. The rivers flow predominantly westward to reach the Waimā close to the small settlement of Moehau.

== See also ==
- List of rivers of New Zealand
