= Doughnut (economic model) =

Economic model for sustainable development (created 2012)

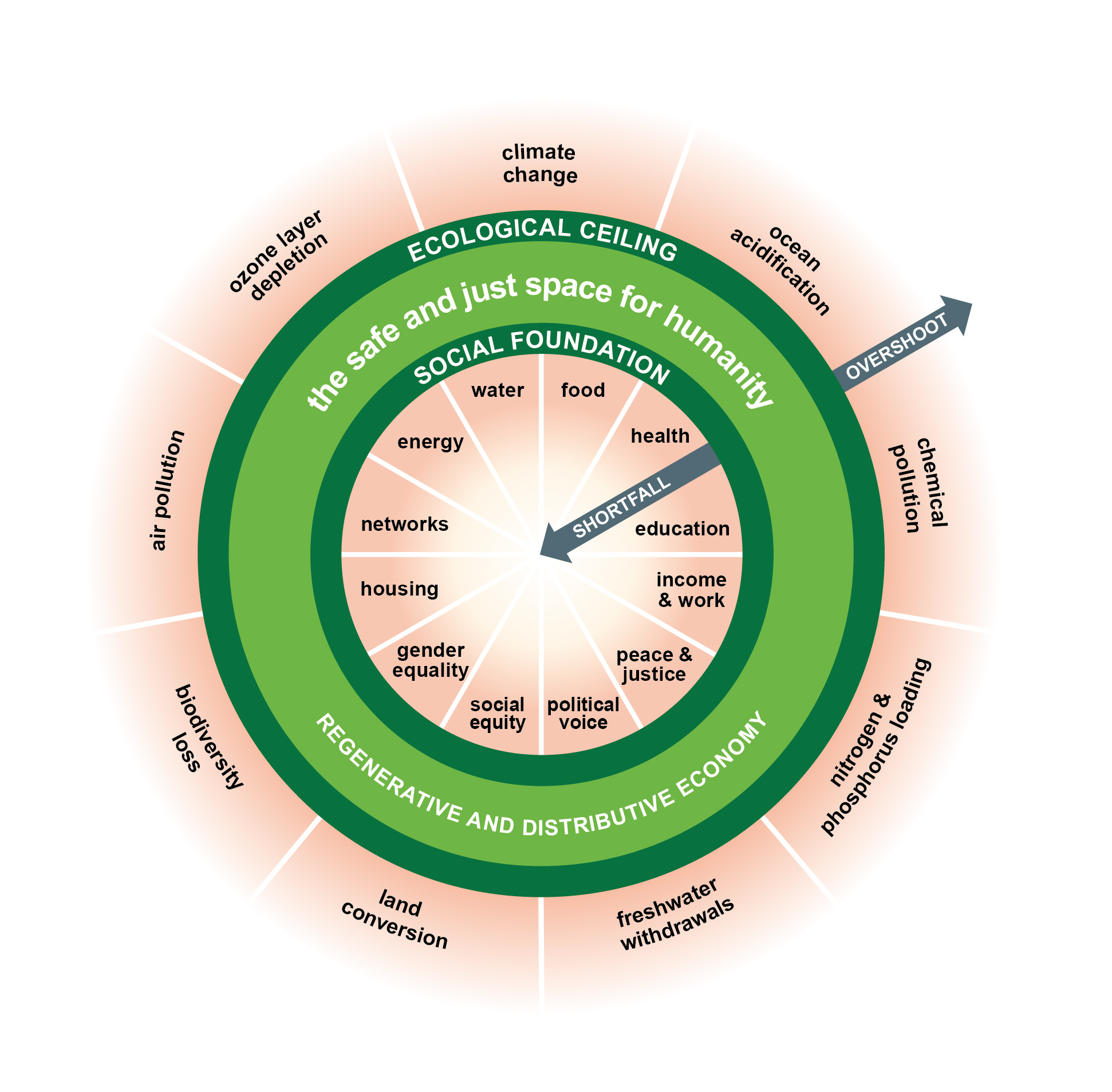
The classic image of the Doughnut; the extent to which boundaries are transgressed and social foundations are met are not visible on this diagram

The Doughnut, or Doughnut economics, is a visual framework for sustainable development – shaped like a doughnut or lifebelt – combining the concept of planetary boundaries with the complementary concept of social boundaries. The name derives from the shape of the diagram, i.e. a disc with a hole in the middle. The centre hole of the model depicts the proportion of people that lack access to life's essentials (healthcare, education, equity and so on) while the crust represents the ecological ceilings (planetary boundaries) that life depends on and must not be overshot. The diagram was developed by University of Oxford economist Kate Raworth in her 2012 Oxfam paper A Safe and Just Space for Humanity and elaborated upon in her 2017 book Doughnut Economics: Seven Ways to Think Like a 21st-Century Economist and paper.

== Conceptual framework ==
The framework was proposed to evaluate the performance of an economy by the extent to which the needs of people are met without overshooting Earth's ecological ceiling. The main goal of the new model is to re-frame economic problems and set new goals. In this context, the model is also referred to as a "wake-up call to transform our capitalist worldview". In this model, an economy is considered prosperous when all twelve social foundations are met without overshooting any of the nine ecological ceilings. This situation is represented by the area between the two rings, considered by its creator as a safe and just space for humanity.

Kate Raworth noted the planetary boundaries concept does not take human wellbeing into account (although, if Earth's ecosystem dies then all wellbeing is moot). She suggested social boundaries should be combined with the planetary boundaries structure. Adding measures such as jobs, education, food, access to water, health services and energy helps to accommodate an environmentally safe space compatible with poverty eradication and "rights for all". Within planetary limits and an equitable social foundation lies a doughnut-shaped area which is the area where there is a "safe and just space for humanity to thrive in".

== Indicators ==
=== Social foundations ===
The social foundations are inspired by the social aims of the Sustainable Development Goals of the United Nations. These are:

- Food security
- Health
- Education
- Income and work (the latter is not limited to compensated employment but also includes things such as housekeeping)
- Peace and justice
- Political voice
- Social equity
- Gender equality
- Housing
- Networks (the latter includes both networks of communities, but also networks of information like the internet)
- Energy
- Water

=== Ecological ceilings ===
The nine ecological ceilings are from the planetary boundaries put forward by a group of Earth-system scientists led by Johan Rockström and Will Steffen. These are:

- Climate change — the human-caused emissions of greenhouse gases such as carbon dioxide and methane trap heat in the atmosphere, changing the Earth's climate.
- Ocean acidification — when human-emitted carbon dioxide is absorbed into the oceans, it makes the water more acidic. For example, this lowers the ability of marine life to grow skeletons and shells.
- Chemical pollution — releasing toxic materials into nature decreases biodiversity and lowers the fertility of animals (including humans).
- Nitrogen and phosphorus loading — inefficient or excessive use of fertiliser leads to the fertilizer running off to water bodies, where they cause algae blooms which kill underwater life.
- Freshwater withdrawals — using too much freshwater dries up the source which may damage the ecosystem and be unusable afterwards.
- Land conversion — converting land for economic activity (such as creating roads and farmland) damages or removes the habitat for wildlife, removes carbon sinks and disrupts natural cycles.
- Biodiversity loss — economic activity may cause a reduction in the number and variety of species. This makes ecosystems more vulnerable and may lower their capacity of sustaining life and providing ecosystem services.
- Air pollution — the emission of aerosols (small particles) has a negative impact on the health of species. It can also affect precipitation and cloud formation.
- Ozone layer depletion — some economic activity emits gases that damage the Earth's ozone layer. Because the ozone layer shields Earth from harmful radiation, its depletion results for example in skin cancer in animals.

== Critique of mainstream economic theory ==
The doughnut model is still a collection of goals that may be pursued through different actions by different actors and does not include specific models related to markets or human behavior. The book Doughnut Economics consists of critiques and perspectives of what should be sought after by society as a whole. The critiques found in the book are targeted at certain economic models and their common base.

The mainstream economic models of the 20th century, defined here as those taught the most in Economics introductory courses around the world, are neoclassical. The Circular Flow published by Paul Samuelson in 1944 and the supply and demand curves published by William S. Jevons in 1862 are canonical examples of neoclassical economic models. Focused on the observable money flows in a given administrative unit and describing preferences mathematically, these models ignore the environments in which these objects are embedded: human minds, society, culture, and the natural environment. This omission was viable while the human population did not collectively overwhelm the Earth's systems, which is no longer the case. Furthermore, these models were created before statistical testing and research were possible. They were based, then, on assumptions about human behavior converted into "stylized facts". The origins of these assumptions are philosophical and pragmatic, simplifying and distorting the reflections of thinkers such as Adam Smith into Newtonian-resembling curves on a graph so that they could be of presumed practical use in predicting, for example, consumer choice.

The body of neoclassical economic theory grew and became more sophisticated over time, and competed with other theories for the post-mainstream economic paradigm of the North Atlantic. In the 1930s, Keynesian theory was it, and after the 1960s, monetarism gained prominence. One element remained as the policy prescriptions shifted: the "rational economic man" persona on which theories were based. Raworth, the creator of Doughnut Economics, denounces this literary invention as a perverse one, for its effects on its learners' assumptions about human behavior and, consequently, their own real behavior. Examples of this phenomenon in action have been documented, as have the effects of the erosion of trust and community on human well-being.

== Real-world economies in the Doughnut perspective ==
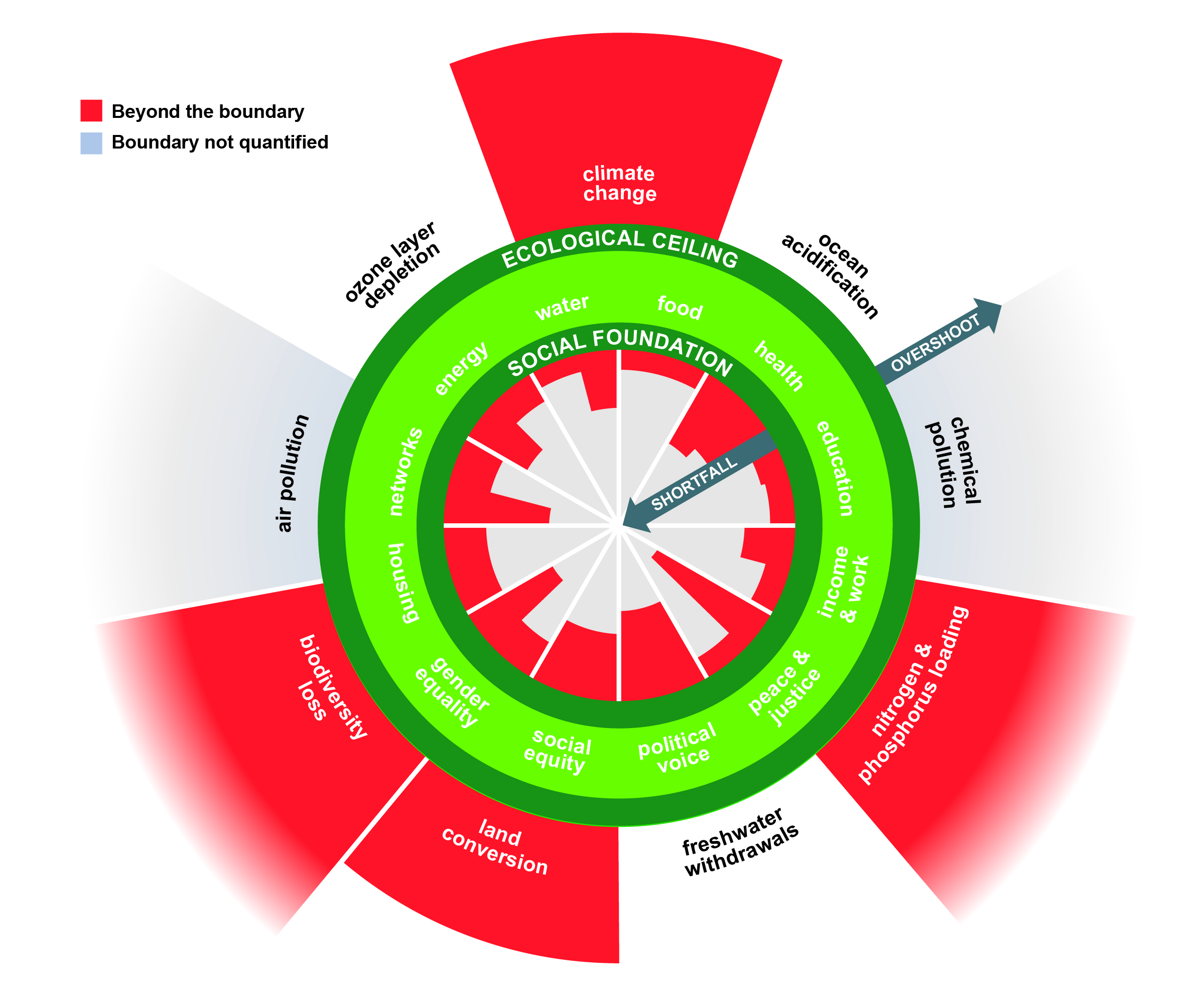
The Doughnut template used for Planet Earth as a whole, indicating errors in red.

Kate Raworth explains the doughnut economy is based on the premise that "Humanity's 21st century challenge is to meet the needs of all within the means of the planet. In other words, to ensure that no one falls short on life's essentials (from food and housing to healthcare and political voice), while ensuring that collectively we do not overshoot our pressure on Earth's life-supporting systems, on which we fundamentally depend – such as a stable climate, fertile soils, and a protective ozone layer. The Doughnut of social and planetary boundaries is a new framing of that challenge, and it acts as a compass for human progress this century."

Raworth states that "significant GDP growth is very much needed" for low- and middle-income countries to be able to meet the goals of the social foundation for their citizens.

Leaning on Earth studies and economics, Raworth maps out the current shortfalls and overshoots, as illustrated in Figure 2.

The Doughnut framework has been used to map localized socio-environmental performance in Erhai lake-catchment (China), Scotland, Wales, the UK, South Africa, Netherlands, India, globally and many more.

In April 2020, Kate Raworth was invited to join the City of Amsterdam's post-pandemic economic planning efforts.

An empirical application of the doughnut model showed in 2018 that so far across 150 countries not a single country satisfies its citizens' basic needs while maintaining a globally sustainable level of resource use.

== Criticism ==
The doughnut model has been criticized for lacking empirical support. In a study by economists Ashruta Acharya, Vincent Geloso, and Aleksander Psurek, the doughnut model was formalized to test its central thesis that capitalism and economic freedom create social and ecological imbalances. The authors found no empirical support for this prediction. On the contrary, the results often showed that higher levels of economic freedom were associated with less imbalance according to the measures derived from the model. The authors concluded that the doughnut model is not supported by the available data.

Welfare economist Erik Schokkaert notes that Raworth raises important challenges for achieving a better development path, but does not address specifics such as which measure of well-being should replace GDP or how exactly to ensure decent material consumption for all while respecting planetary boundaries. He argues that her criticism targets a caricature of mainstream economics, making it a straw man. Although there is room for debate on issues such as methodological individualism, these are absent from her work. Schokkaert further observes that economic science has moved beyond simplistic assumptions and is increasingly empirically oriented, focusing on behavioral agents in imperfect markets influenced by non-monetary factors. His main concern is that Raworth’s approach mixes positive (factual) and normative considerations, with policy prescriptions based largely on beliefs, hopes, and convictions, rather than on serious empirical analysis. Rather than rejecting mainstream economics, he suggests building coalitions with real mainstream economists who share her views that markets must be embedded in a broader societal context, account for resource constraints and power inequalities, and recognize that humans are motivated by more than self-interest and make decisions with limited rationality—perspectives already present in mainstream economics.

Branko Milanović of CUNY’s Stone Center on Socio-Economic Inequality criticises the doughnut model for ignoring that if everyone were to reach the current median income of rich countries, world GDP would need to triple—an issue Raworth does not address. He also notes that while the book lists many “green” initiatives, it never assesses their impact, which in reality is marginal compared to what is needed. Raworth acknowledges that economic growth helps ease distributional conflicts, sustain democracy, and support people’s well-being, but she fails to provide convincing arguments for how a “no-growth” regime could emerge—or how it could address these social and political challenges. It would require people "magically" to become indifferent to wealth and status—something he calls unrealistic. He concludes that the doughnut model relies on “miracles,” while neglecting the real miracle of China’s growth that lifted 700 million people from poverty.

Maria Zhivitskaya of the London School of Economics noted the model's multidisciplinary promise and appealing metaphors, but remained unconvinced of the model's ability to evoke change. She argued that Raworth’s dismissal of the “rational economic man” was based on a weak reasoning, pointing out that using Daniel Kahneman’s work on cognitive biases to discredit economics as a discipline was unfair, given that Kahneman’s contributions were themselves recognised with a Nobel Prize in Economics. Zhivitskaya noted that while Raworth’s metaphors are "flowery and appealing", they provide little guidance for concrete policymaking. Complex issues, such as integrating environmental and economic accounting, are said to fall outside the scope of her idealistic approach.

== See also ==
- Critique of political economy
- Ecological economics
- Prosperity Without Growth
- The Closing Circle
