= The Wonderbox =

The Wonderbox: Curious Histories of How to Live
- Authors: Roman Krznaric
- Language: English
- Subject: Psychology, Philosophy
- Published: 2012 (Profile Books)
- Publication place: United Kingdom
- Media type: Hardcover
- Pages: 368
- ISBN: 978-1-846-68394-7

The Wonderbox: Curious Histories of How to Live is a 2012 book by Roman Krznaric. It explores aspects of the human psyche, and makes the case for people to empathise more with each other. The book uses broad range of historical examples.
