= Empathy Museum =

Series of art installations, established 2015

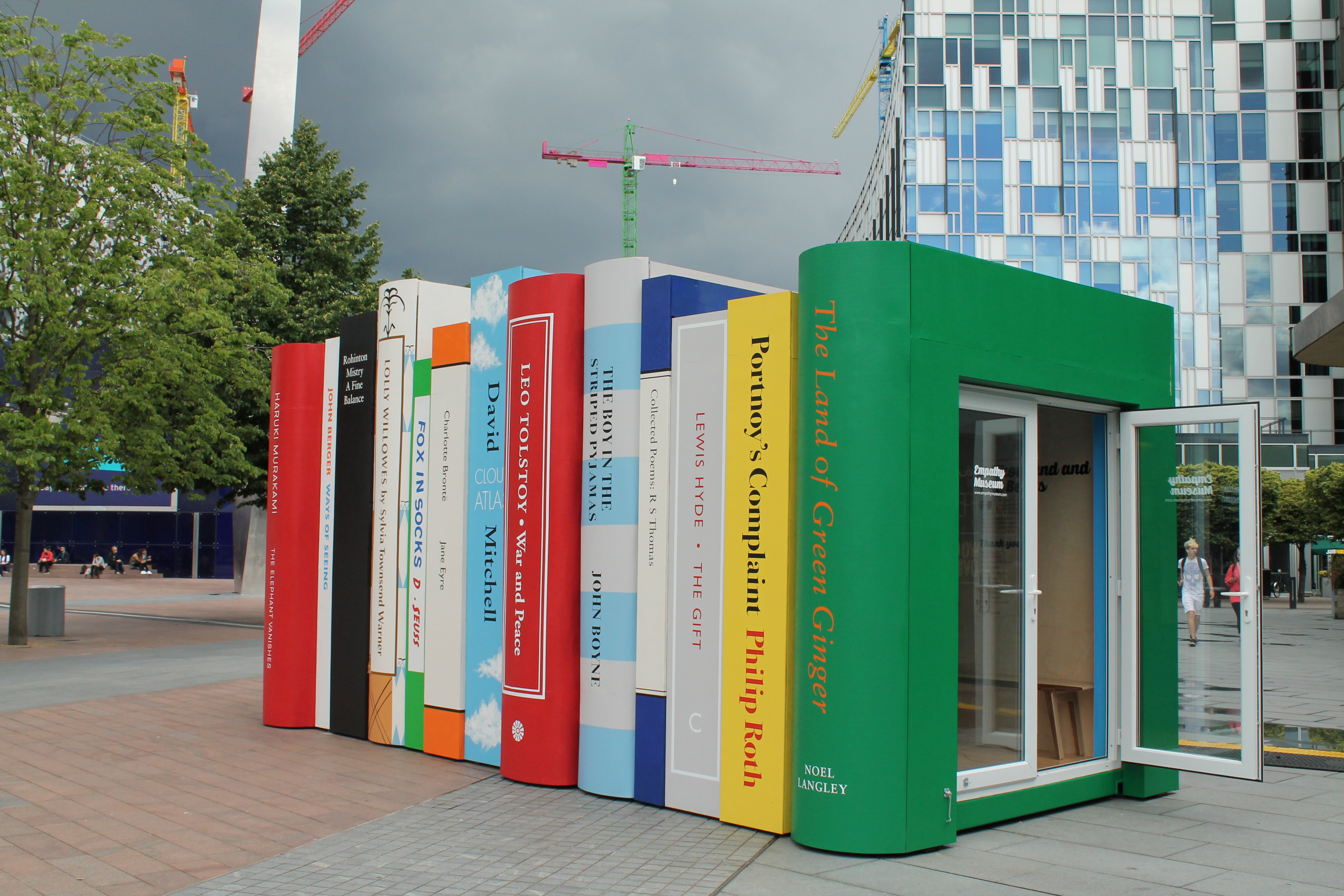
Empathy Museum's A Thousand and One Books at the London International Festival of Theatre in 2016.

Empathy Museum is a series of art installations, begun in 2015. Its purpose is to help visitors view the world through the perspectives of others, using participatory storytelling and dialogue. The project states it can help people approach global issues such as prejudice, conflict and inequality by expressing empathy to change relationships. A weekly podcast, A Mile in My Shoes, was started in 2018.

== Background and description ==
The project was founded by philosopher Roman Krznaric and is directed by artist Clare Patey.

In May 2018, Empathy Museum began a weekly podcast titled A Mile in My Shoes. The podcast shares stories of the lives of various people around the world.

Empathy Museum does not have a permanent location. Its projects are each designed as temporary installations that travel to international locations.

Empathy Museum's offices are based in London, United Kingdom.

== Projects ==
=== A Thousand and One Books ===
A Thousand and One Books is a crowd-sourced collection of 1001 books. Each book in the "library" has been donated by "someone who loves that book and thinks that other people might love it too". Notable book donors include Jay Rayner, Kate Raworth, Lemn Sissay, Ian McKellen, Chris O'Dowd and Suzanne Moore. The books can be taken out by the public and then passed on to other people, instead of being returned.

A Thousand and One Books has been presented at London International Festival of Theatre in 2016, and at the Krasnoyarsk Book Culture Fair in 2016.

=== Human Library ===
Human Library is "like any other library but instead of borrowing a book you can borrow a person for conversation". The library presents a selection of "Living Books": people who tell a story about their life and discuss it with a member of the public visiting the installation.

Each Human Library is centred around a different theme including fashion, food, home and age.

Human Library has been presented in London at SOAS (2015), Whitechapel Gallery (2015), the London International Festival of Theatre (2016), and in Perth, Western Australia, at the Perth Writers Festival (2016).

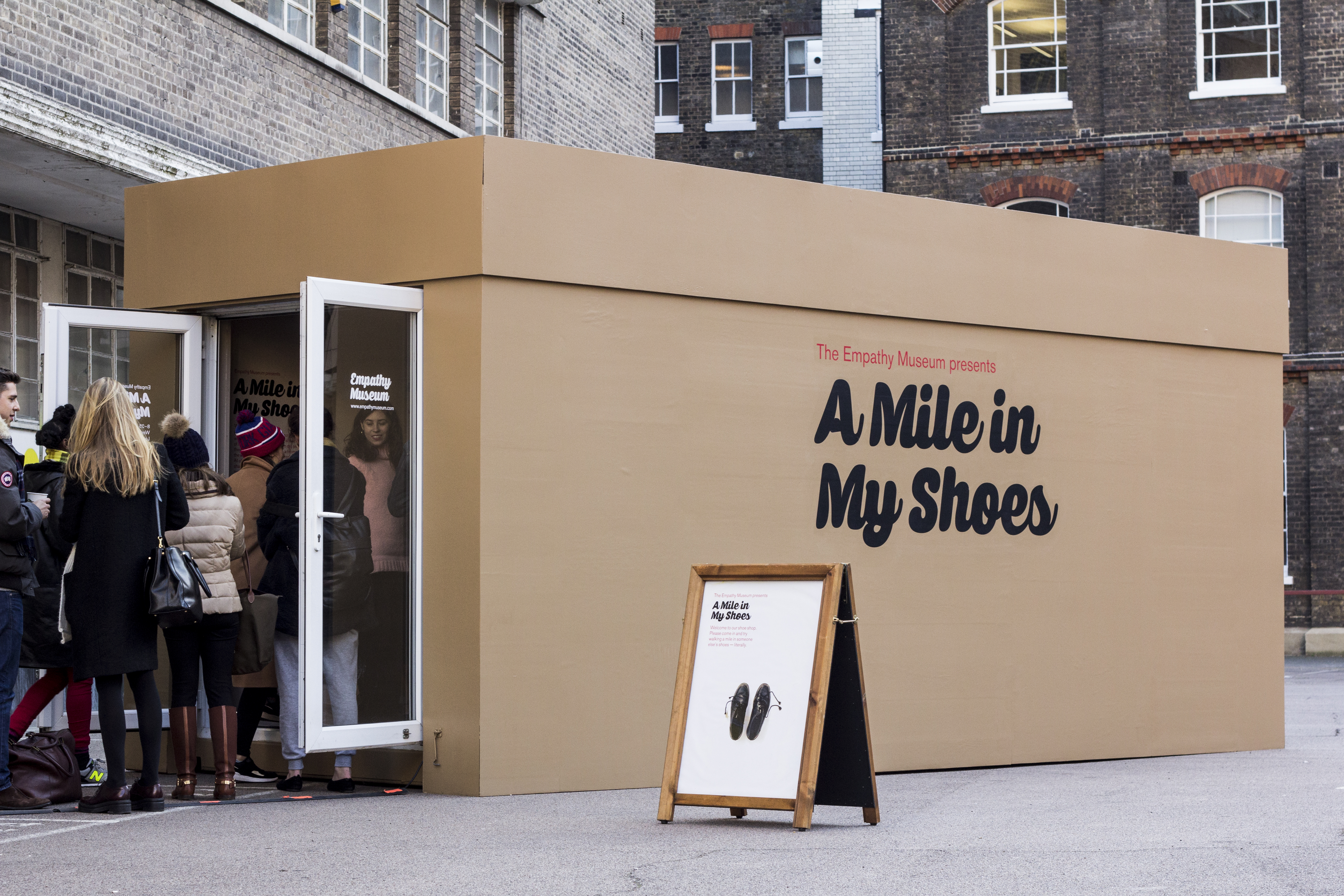
Empathy Museum's A Mile in My Shoes at The Migration Museum in London, 2018.

=== A Mile in My Shoes ===
A Mile in My Shoes is a travelling "shoe shop" with over 350 pairs of shoes and audio stories collected by Empathy Museum. Visitors are invited to walk a mile in someone else's shoes by temporarily exchanging their footwear for a pair in the museum's collection. While walking, visitors listen to a story about the shoe owner's life through a pair of headphones.

At each location it travels to, the museum collects stories and shoes from local people. Sometimes iterations of the project centre around certain themes. These include collections of stories from migrants in England (in collaboration with London's Migration Museum, 2018), from UK health and social care workers (commissioned by the Health Foundation, 2018), from people who came to the UK as refugees (in collaboration with Choose Love, 2019), from young people in Scotland (in collaboration with National Theatre Scotland, 2019), and stories with a connection to water (in collaboration with Arts Centre Melbourne 2020). Stories have been collected in various languages, including English, French, Italian, German, Latvian, Slovenian, Dutch, and Portuguese.

A Mile in My Shoes has been presented across England and internationally, including in Belgium (2017), Australia (2017, 2019), Ireland (2017), Brazil (2017), Scotland (2018), the USA (2018), Latvia (2020), Slovenia (2020), Italy (2021), Germany (2021), and Romania (2021).

=== From Where I'm Standing ===
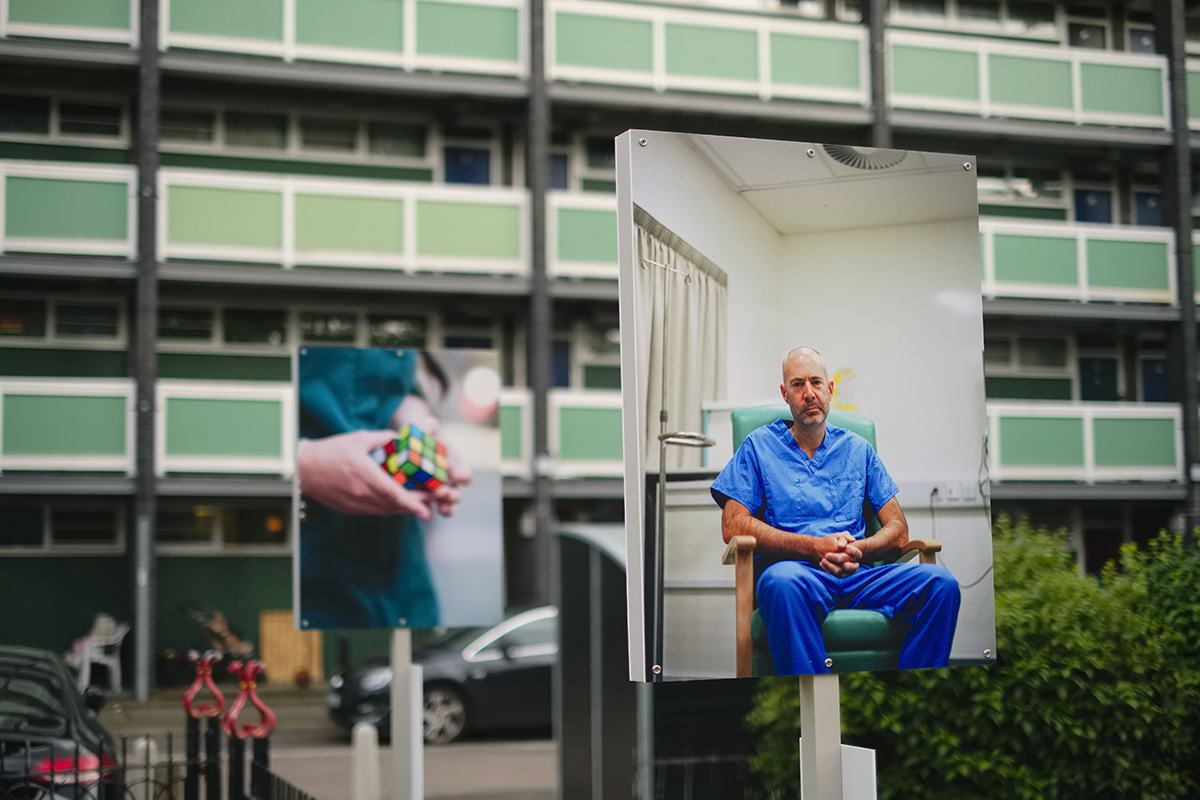
Empathy Museum's From Where I'm Standing at Sceaux Gardens Estate, Peckham, 2021

From Where I'm Standing is a portrait of life in London in 2020, through photography and audio stories installed outdoors. The project celebrates 34 extraordinary people, ranging from a midwife and a supermarket worker to an undertaker and an anaesthetist. It has been displayed in London at Sceaux Gardens Estate, Peckham and Dalberg Road, Brixton.
