= Planetary boundaries =

Limits to safe impact on the Earth ecology

The "Planetary Boundaries (PBs) diagram visually represents the current status of the nine PB processes that regulate our planet's health. Each process is quantified by one or more control variables based on observational data, model simulations and expert opinions." 2025.

Planetary boundaries are a framework to describe limits to the impacts of human activities on the Earth system. Beyond these limits, the environment may not be able to continue to self-regulate. This would mean the Earth system would leave the period of stability of the Holocene, in which human society developed.

These nine boundaries are climate change, ocean acidification, stratospheric ozone depletion, biogeochemical flows in the nitrogen cycle, excess global freshwater use, land system change, the erosion of biosphere integrity, chemical pollution and atmospheric aerosol loading.

The framework is based on scientific evidence that human actions, especially those of industrialized societies since the Industrial Revolution, have become the main driver of global environmental change. According to the framework, "transgressing one or more planetary boundaries may be deleterious or even catastrophic due to the risk of crossing thresholds that will trigger non-linear, abrupt environmental change within continental-scale to planetary-scale systems."

The normative component of the framework is that human societies have been able to thrive under the comparatively stable climatic and ecological conditions of the Holocene. To the extent that these Earth system process boundaries have not been crossed, they mark the "safe zone" for human societies on the planet. Proponents of the planetary boundary framework propose returning to this environmental and climatic system; as opposed to human science and technology deliberately creating a more beneficial climate. The concept doesn't address how humans have massively altered ecological conditions to better suit themselves. The climatic and ecological Holocene this framework considers as a "safe zone" doesn't involve massive industrial farming. So this framework begs a reassessment of how to feed modern populations.

The concept has since become influential in the international community (e.g. United Nations Conference on Sustainable Development), including governments at all levels, international organizations, civil society and the scientific community. The framework consists of nine global change processes. In 2009, according to Rockström and others, three boundaries were already crossed (biodiversity loss, climate change and nitrogen cycle), while others were in imminent danger of being crossed.

In 2015, several of the scientists in the original group published an update, bringing in new co-authors and new model-based analysis. According to this update, four of the boundaries were crossed: climate change, loss of biosphere integrity, land-system change, altered biogeochemical cycles (phosphorus and nitrogen). The scientists also changed the name of the boundary "Loss of biodiversity" to "Change in biosphere integrity" to emphasize that not only the number of species but also the functioning of the biosphere as a whole is important for Earth system stability. Similarly, the "Chemical pollution" boundary was renamed to "Introduction of novel entities", widening the scope to consider different kinds of human-generated materials that disrupt Earth system processes.

In 2022, based on the available literature, the introduction of novel entities was concluded to be the 5th transgressed planetary boundary. Freshwater change was concluded to be the 6th transgressed planetary boundary in 2023 before ocean acidification was documented to be the 7th crossed limit in 2025.

== Framework overview and principles ==
The basic idea of the Planetary Boundaries framework is that maintaining the observed resilience of the Earth system in the Holocene is a precondition for humanity's pursuit of long-term social and economic development. The Planetary Boundaries framework contributes to an understanding of global sustainability because it brings a planetary scale and a long timeframe into focus.

The framework described nine "planetary life support systems" essential for maintaining a "desired Holocene state", and attempted to quantify how far seven of these systems had been pushed already. Boundaries were defined to help define a "safe space for human development", which was an improvement on approaches aiming at minimizing human impacts on the planet.

The framework is based on scientific evidence that human actions, especially those of industrialized societies since the Industrial Revolution, have become the main driver of global environmental change. According to the framework, "transgressing one or more planetary boundaries may be deleterious or even catastrophic due to the risk of crossing thresholds that will trigger non-linear, abrupt environmental change within continental-scale to planetary-scale systems." The framework consists of nine global change processes. In 2009, two boundaries were already crossed, while others were in imminent danger of being crossed. Later estimates indicated that three of these boundaries—climate change, biodiversity loss, and the biogeochemical flow boundary—appear to have been crossed.

The scientists outlined how breaching the boundaries increases the threat of functional disruption, even collapse, in Earth's biophysical systems in ways that could be catastrophic for human wellbeing. While they highlighted scientific uncertainty, they indicated that breaching boundaries could "trigger feedbacks that may result in crossing thresholds that drastically reduce the ability to return within safe levels". The boundaries were "rough, first estimates only, surrounded by large uncertainties and knowledge gaps" which interact in complex ways that are not yet well understood.

The planetary boundaries framework lays the groundwork for a shifting approach to governance and management, away from the essentially sectoral analyses of limits to growth aimed at minimizing negative externalities, toward the estimation of the safe space for human development. Planetary boundaries demarcate, as it were, the "planetary playing field" for humanity if major human-induced environmental change on a global scale is to be avoided.

=== Authors ===
The authors of this framework was a group of Earth System and environmental scientists in 2009 led by Johan Rockström from the Stockholm Resilience Centre and Will Steffen from the Australian National University. They collaborated with 26 leading academics, including Nobel laureate Paul Crutzen, Goddard Institute for Space Studies climate scientist James Hansen, oceanographer Katherine Richardson, geographer Diana Liverman and the German Chancellor's chief climate adviser Hans Joachim Schellnhuber.

Most of the contributing scientists were involved in strategy-setting for the Earth System Science Partnership, the precursor to the international global change research network Future Earth. The group wanted to define a "safe operating space for humanity" for the wider scientific community, as a precondition for sustainable development.

== Nine boundaries ==
=== Thresholds and tipping points ===
The 2009 study identified nine planetary boundaries with quantifications for seven of them, eight of them are now being quantified in 2025. These are:

1. climate change (CO_{2} concentration in the atmosphere < 350 ppm and/or a maximum change of +1 W/m^{2} in radiative forcing);
2. change in biosphere integrity (an annual rate of loss of biological diversity of < 10 extinctions per million species).
3. land system change (< 15% of the ice-free land surface under cropland);
4. freshwater change (< 4000 km^{3}/yr of consumptive use of runoff resources);
5. modification of biogeochemical flows in the nitrogen (N) cycle (limit industrial and agricultural fixation of N_{2} to 35 Tg N/yr) and phosphorus (P) cycle (annual P inflow to oceans not to exceed 10 times the natural background weathering of P);
6. ocean acidification (mean surface seawater saturation state with respect to aragonite ≥ 80% of pre-industrial levels);
7. increase in atmospheric aerosol loading (for this one process in the planetary boundaries framework, the scientists have not specified a global boundary quantification);
8. stratospheric ozone depletion (less than 5% reduction in total atmospheric O_{3} from a pre-industrial level of 290 Dobson Units);
9. introduction of novel entities in the environment (chemical pollution).

The quantification of individual planetary boundaries is based on the observed dynamics of the interacting Earth system processes included in the framework. The control variables were chosen because together they provide an effective way to track the human-caused shift away from Holocene conditions.

For some of Earth's dynamic processes, historic data display clear thresholds between comparatively stable conditions. For example, past ice-ages show that during peak glacial conditions, the atmospheric concentration of CO_{2} was ~180-200 ppm. In interglacial periods (including the Holocene), CO_{2} concentration has fluctuated around 280 ppm. To know what past climate conditions were like with an atmosphere with over 350 ppm CO_{2}, scientists need to look back about 3 million years. The paleo record of climatic, ecological and biogeochemical changes shows that the Earth system has experienced tipping points, when a very small increment for a control variable (like CO_{2}) triggers a larger, possibly catastrophic, change in the response variable (global warming) through feedbacks in the natural Earth System itself.

For several of the processes in the planetary boundaries framework, it is difficult to locate individual points that mark the threshold shift away from Holocene-like conditions. This is because the Earth system is complex and the scientific evidence base is still partial and fragmented. Instead, the planetary boundaries framework identifies many Earth system thresholds at multiple scales that will be influenced by increases in the control variables. Examples include shifts in monsoon behavior linked to the aerosol loading and freshwater use planetary boundaries.

Planetary Boundaries (as defined in 2025)
Earth-system process	Control variable	Boundary value in 2025	"Current" value (i.e. for the year provided in the source)	Boundary now exceeded beyond the 2025 values? (based on "current" value)	Preindustrial Holocene base value
1. Climate Change	Atmospheric carbon dioxide concentration (ppm by volume) See also: Tipping point (climatology)	350 ppm	423 ppm	yes	280
1. Climate Change	Total anthropogenic radiative forcing at top-of-atmosphere (W/m^{2}) since the start of the industrial revolution (~1750)	+1 Wm^{−2}	+2.97 Wm^{−2}	yes	0
2. Change in Biosphere Integrity	Genetic diversity: Extinction rate measured as E/MSY (extinctions per million species-years)	<10 E/MSY but with an aspirational goal of ca. 1 E/MSY (assumed background rate of extinction loss)	>100 E/MSY	yes	1 E/MSY
2. Change in Biosphere Integrity	Functional diversity: energy available to ecosystems (NPP (Note: Natural Primary Production)) (% HANPP (Note: Human Appropriation of Natural Primary Production))	HANPP (in billion tonnes of C year−1) <10% of preindustrial Holocene NPP, i.e., >90% remaining for supporting biosphere function	30% HANPP	yes	1.9% (2σ variability of preindustrial Holocene century-mean NPP)
3. Land System Change	Part of forests rested intact (percent)	75 % from all forests including 85% from Boreal forest and Tropical forests, 50% from Temperate forests	Global: 59%	yes	0
4. Freshwater Change	Blue water: human induced disturbance of blue water flow	Upper limit (95th percentile) of global land area with deviations greater than during preindustrial, Blue water: 12.9%	22.6%	yes	9.4%
4. Freshwater Change	Green water: human induced disturbance of water available to plants (% land area with deviations from preindustrial variability)	12.4%	22.0%	yes	9.8%
5. Modification of Biogeochemical Flows	Phosphate global: P flow from freshwater systems into the ocean; regional: P flow from fertilizers to erodible soils (Tg of P year^{−1})	Global: 11 Tg of P year^{−1}; regional: 6.2 Tg of P year^{−1} mined and applied to erodible (agricultural) soils.	Global: 4.4 Tg of P year^{−1}; regional: 18.2 Tg of P year^{−1}	yes	0
5. Modification of Biogeochemical Flows	Nitrogen global: industrial and intentional fixation of N (Tg of N year^{−1})	62 Tg year^{−1}	165 Tg year^{−1}	yes	0
6. Ocean Acidification	Global mean saturation state of calcium carbonate in surface seawater (omega units)	2.86	2.84	yes	3.44
7. Increase in Atmospheric Aerosol Loading	Interhemispheric difference in AOD (Aerosol Optical Depth)	0.1 (mean annual interhemispheric difference)	0.063	no	0.03
8. Stratospheric Ozone Depletion	Stratospheric ozone concentration (Dobson units)	277	285.7	no	290
9. Introduction of Novel Entities	Percentage of synthetic chemicals released to the environment without adequate safety testing	0	>0 (transgressed)	yes	0

=== "Safe operating spaces" ===
The planetary boundaries framework proposes a range of values for its control variables. This range is supposed to span the threshold between a 'safe operating space' where Holocene-like dynamics can be maintained and a highly uncertain, poorly predictable world where Earth system changes likely increase risks to societies. The boundary is defined as the lower end of that range. If the boundaries are persistently crossed, the world goes further into a danger zone.

It is difficult to restore a 'safe operating space' for humanity that is described by the planetary boundary concept. Even if past biophysical changes could be mitigated, the predominant paradigms of social and economic development appear largely indifferent to the looming possibilities of large scale environmental disasters triggered by human actions. Legal boundaries can help keep human activities in check, but are only as effective as the political will to make and enforce them.

=== Interaction among boundaries ===
Understanding the Earth system is fundamentally about understanding interactions among environmental change processes. The planetary boundaries are defined with reference to dynamic conditions of the Earth system, but scientific discussions about how different planetary boundaries relate to each other are often philosophically and analytically muddled. Clearer definitions of the basic concepts and terms might help give clarity.

There are many many interactions among the processes in the planetary boundaries framework. While these interactions can create both stabilizing and destabilizing feedbacks in the Earth system, the authors suggested that a transgressed planetary boundary will reduce the safe operating space for other processes in the framework rather than expand it from the proposed boundary levels. They give the example that the land use boundary could "shift downward" if the freshwater boundary is breached, causing lands to become arid and unavailable for agriculture. At a regional level, water resources may decline in Asia if deforestation continues in the Amazon. That way of framing the interactions shifts from the framework's biophysical definition of boundaries based on Holocene-like conditions to an anthropocentric definition (demand for agricultural land). Despite this conceptual slippage, considerations of known Earth system interactions across scales suggest the need for "extreme caution in approaching or transgressing any individual planetary boundaries."

Another example has to do with coral reefs and marine ecosystems: In 2009, researchers showed that, since 1990, calcification in the reefs of the Great Barrier that they examined decreased at a rate unprecedented over the last 400 years (14% in less than 20 years). Their evidence suggests that the increasing temperature stress and the declining ocean saturation state of aragonite is making it difficult for reef corals to deposit calcium carbonate. Multiple stressors, such as increased nutrient loads and fishing pressure, moves corals into less desirable ecosystem states. Ocean acidification will significantly change the distribution and abundance of a whole range of marine life, particularly species "that build skeletons, shells, and tests of biogenic calcium carbonate. Increasing temperatures, surface UV radiation levels and ocean acidity all stress marine biota, and the combination of these stresses may well cause perturbations in the abundance and diversity of marine biological systems that go well beyond the effects of a single stressor acting alone."

=== Proposed new or expanded boundaries since 2012 ===
In 2012, Steven Running suggested a tenth boundary, the annual net global primary production of all terrestrial plants, as an easily determinable measure integrating many variables that will give "a clear signal about the health of ecosystems".

In 2015, a second paper was published in Science to update the Planetary Boundaries concept. The update concluded four boundaries had now been transgressed: climate, biodiversity, land use and biogeochemical cycles. The 2015 paper emphasized interactions of the nine boundaries and identified climate change and loss of biodiversity integrity as 'core boundaries' of central importance to the framework because the interactions of climate and the biosphere are what scientifically defines Earth system conditions.

In 2017, some authors argued that marine systems are underrepresented in the framework. Their proposed remedy was to include the seabed as a component of the earth surface change boundary. They also wrote that the framework should account for "changes in vertical mixing and ocean circulation patterns".

Subsequent work on planetary boundaries begins to relate these thresholds at the regional scale.

=== Debate and further research per boundary ===
==== Climate change ====
A 2018 study calls into question the adequacy of efforts to limit warming to 2 °C above pre-industrial temperatures, as set out in the Paris Agreement. The scientists raise the possibility that even if greenhouse gas emissions are substantially reduced to limit warming to 2 °C, that might exceed the "threshold" at which self-reinforcing climate feedbacks add additional warming until the climate system stabilizes in a hothouse climate state. This would make parts of the world uninhabitable for people, raise sea levels by up to 60 metres (200 feet), and raise temperatures by 4–5 °C (7.2–9.0 °F) to levels that are higher than any interglacial period in the past 1.2 million years.

==== Change in biosphere integrity ====
According to the biologist Cristián Samper, a "boundary that expresses the probability of families of species disappearing over time would better reflect our potential impacts on the future of life on Earth." The biodiversity boundary has also been criticized for framing biodiversity solely in terms of the extinction rate. The global extinction rate has been highly variable over the Earth's history, and thus using it as the only biodiversity variable can be of limited usefulness.

==== Nitrogen and phosphorus ====
The biogeochemist William Schlesinger thinks waiting until we near some suggested limit for nitrogen deposition and other pollutions will just permit us to continue to a point where it is too late. He says the boundary suggested for phosphorus is not sustainable, and would exhaust the known phosphorus reserves in less than 200 years.

The ocean chemist Peter Brewer queries whether it is "truly useful to create a list of environmental limits without serious plans for how they may be achieved ... they may become just another stick to beat citizens with. Disruption of the global nitrogen cycle is one clear example: it is likely that a large fraction of people on Earth would not be alive today without the artificial production of fertilizer. How can such ethical and economic issues be matched with a simple call to set limits? ... food is not optional."

Peak phosphorus is a concept to describe the point in time at which the maximum global phosphorus production rate is reached. Phosphorus is a scarce finite resource on earth and means of production other than mining are unavailable because of its non-gaseous environmental cycle. According to some researchers, Earth's phosphorus reserves are expected to be completely depleted in 50–100 years and peak phosphorus to be reached by approximately 2030. However, recent evidence shows that if phosphorus applications to soil are matched to the agronomic optimum for crop yield, it would take >500 years to exhaust currently econimically viable phosphorus reserves.

==== Ocean acidification ====
Surface ocean acidity is clearly interconnected with the climate change boundaries, since the concentration of carbon dioxide in the atmosphere is also the underlying control variable for the ocean acidification boundary.

The ocean chemist Peter Brewer thinks "ocean acidification has impacts other than simple changes in pH, and these may need boundaries too."

==== Land-system change ====
Across the planet, forests, wetlands and other vegetation types are being converted to agricultural and other land uses, impacting freshwater, carbon and other cycles, and reducing biodiversity. In the year 2015 the boundary was defined as 75% of forests rested intact, including 85% of boreal forests, 50% of temperate forests and 85% of tropical forests. The boundary is crossed because only 62% of forests rested intact as of the year 2015.

The boundary for land use has been criticized as follows: "The boundary of 15 per cent land-use change is, in practice, a premature policy guideline that dilutes the authors' overall scientific proposition. Instead, the authors might want to consider a limit on soil degradation or soil loss. This would be a more valid and useful indicator of the state of terrestrial health."

==== Freshwater ====
The freshwater cycle is another boundary significantly affected by climate change. Overexploitation of freshwater occurs if a water resource is mined or extracted at a rate that exceeds the recharge rate. Water pollution and saltwater intrusion can also turn much of the world's underground water and lakes into finite resources with "peak water" usage debates similar to oil.

The hydrologist David Molden stated in 2009 that planetary boundaries are a welcome new approach in the "limits to growth" debate but said "a global limit on water consumption is necessary, but the suggested planetary boundary of 4,000 cubic kilometres per year is too generous."

===== Green and blue water =====
A study concludes that the 'Freshwater use' boundary should be renamed to the 'Freshwater change', composed of "green" and "blue" water components. 'Green water' refers to disturbances of terrestrial precipitation, evaporation and soil moisture. Water scarcity can have substantial effects in agriculture. When measuring and projecting water scarcity in agriculture for climate change scenarios, both "green water" and "blue water" are of relevance.

In April 2022, scientists proposed and preliminarily evaluated 'green water' in the water cycle as a likely transgressed planetary boundary, as measured by root-zone soil moisture deviation from Holocene variability.

==== Ozone depletion ====
The stratospheric ozone layer protectively filters ultraviolet radiation (UV) from the Sun, which would otherwise damage biological systems. The actions taken after the Montreal Protocol appeared to be keeping the planet within a safe boundary.

The Nobel laureate in chemistry Mario Molina says "five per cent is a reasonable limit for acceptable ozone depletion, but it doesn't represent a tipping point".

==== Atmospheric aerosols ====
Worldwide each year, aerosol particles result in about 800,000 premature deaths from air pollution. Aerosol loading is sufficiently important to be included among the planetary boundaries, but it is not yet clear whether an appropriate safe threshold measure can be identified.

==== Novel entities (chemical pollution) ====
State parties to the Stockholm Convention on Persistent Organic Pollutants

Some chemicals, such as persistent organic pollutants, heavy metals and radionuclides, have potentially irreversible additive and synergic effects on biological organisms, reducing fertility and resulting in permanent genetic damage. Sublethal uptakes are drastically reducing marine bird and mammal populations. This boundary seems important, although it is hard to quantify. In 2019, it was suggested that novel entities could include genetically modified organisms, pesticides and even artificial intelligence.

A Bayesian emulator for persistent organic pollutants has been developed which can potentially be used to quantify the boundaries for chemical pollution. To date, critical exposure levels of polychlorinated biphenyls (PCBs) above which mass mortality events of marine mammals are likely to occur, have been proposed as a chemical pollution planetary boundary.

There are at least 350,000 artificial chemicals in the world. They are coming from "plastics, pesticides, industrial chemicals, chemicals in consumer products, antibiotics and other pharmaceuticals". They have mostly "negative effects on planetary health". Their production increased 50 times since 1950 and is expected to increase 3 times more by 2050. Plastics alone contain more than 10,000 chemicals and create large problems. The researchers are calling for limit on chemical production and shift to circular economy, meaning to products that can be reused and recycled.

In January 2022 a group of scientists concluded that this planetary boundary is already exceeded, which puts in risk the stability of the Earth system. They integrated the literature information on how production and release of a number of novel entities, including plastics and hazardous chemicals, have rapidly increased in the last decades with significant impact on the planetary processes.

In August 2022, scientists concluded that the (overall transgressed) boundary is a placeholder for multiple different boundaries for NEs that may emerge, reporting that PFAS pollution is one such new boundary. They show that levels of these so-called "forever chemicals" in rainwater are ubiquitously, and often greatly, above guideline safe levels worldwide. There are some moves to restrict and replace their use.

In 2024 a report by Planet Tracker, dedicated to this planetary boundary stipulated that The Chemical Abstracts Service (CAS) registered more than 204,000,000 chemicals since the 19 century. From them, over 350,000 chemicals are allowed for production and use in North America and Europe and from those 350,000, most are untested and 14% are unknown because companies does not disclose their composition. Their negative impacts on health is more than a tenth of the global GDP and they can impact more than 1 planetary boundary: Chlorofluorocarbons, for example, can impact 3 at the same time.

== Related concepts ==
=== Planetary integrity ===
Planetary integrity is also called earth's life-support systems or ecological integrity. Scholars have pointed out that planetary integrity "needs to be maintained for long-term sustainability". The term integrity refers to ecological health in this context. The concept of planetary integrity is interlinked within the concept of planetary boundaries.

An Expert Panel on Ecological Integrity in 1998 has defined ecological integrity as follows: "Ecosystems have integrity when they have their native components (plants, animals and other organisms) and processes (such as growth and reproduction) intact."

There are many negative human impacts on the environment that are causing a reduction in planetary integrity. For example, the current biodiversity loss is threatening ecological integrity on a global scale. The Sustainable Development Goals might be able to act as a steering mechanism to address the current loss of planetary integrity.

=== The "Limits to Growth" (1972) and Gaia theory ===
The idea that there are limits to the burden placed upon our planet by human activities has been around for a long time. The Planetary Boundaries framework acknowledges the influence of the 1972 study, The Limits to Growth, that presented a model in which exponential growth in world population, industrialization, pollution, food production, and resources depletion outstrip the ability of technology to increase resources availability. Subsequently, the report was widely dismissed, particularly by economists and business people, and it has often been claimed that history has proved the projections to be incorrect. In 2008, Graham Turner from the Commonwealth Scientific and Industrial Research Organisation (CSIRO) published "A comparison of The Limits to Growth with thirty years of reality". The Limits to Growth has been widely discussed, both by critics of the modelling approach and its conclusions and by analysts who argue that the insight that societies do not live in an unlimited world and that historical data since the 1970s support the report's findings. The Limits to Growth approach explores how the socio-technical dynamics of the world economy may limit humanity's opportunities and introduce risks of collapse. In contrast, the Planetary Boundaries framework focuses on the biophysical dynamics of the Earth system.

Our Common Future was published in 1987 by United Nations' World Commission on Environment and Development. It tried to recapture the spirit of the Stockholm Conference. Its aim was to interlock the concepts of development and environment for future political discussions. It introduced the famous definition for sustainable development: "Development that meets the needs of the present without compromising the ability of future generations to meet their own needs."

Another key idea influencing the Planetary Boundaries framework is the Gaia theory or hypothesis. In the 1970s, James Lovelock and microbiologist Lynn Margulis presented the idea that all organisms and their inorganic surroundings on Earth are integrated into a single self-regulating system. The system has the ability to react to perturbations or deviations, much like a living organism adjusts its regulation mechanisms to accommodate environmental changes such as temperature (homeostasis). Nevertheless, this capacity has limits. For instance, when a living organism is subjected to a temperature that is lower or higher than its living range, it can perish because its regulating mechanism cannot make the necessary adjustments. Similarly the Earth may not be able to react to large deviations in critical parameters. In Lovelock's book The Revenge of Gaia, he suggests that the destruction of rainforests and biodiversity, compounded with global warming resulting from the increase of greenhouse gases made by humans, could shift feedbacks in the Earth system away from a self-regulating balance to a positive (intensifying) feedback loop.

=== Anthropocene ===
From the Stockholm Memorandum

Science indicates that we are transgressing planetary boundaries that have kept civilization safe for the past 10,000 years. Evidence is growing that human pressures are starting to overwhelm the Earth's buffering capacity. Humans are now the most significant driver of global change, propelling the planet into a new geological epoch, the Anthropocene. We can no longer exclude the possibility that our collective actions will trigger tipping points, risking abrupt and irreversible consequences for human communities and ecological systems.

— Stockholm Memorandum (2011)

Scientists have affirmed that the planet has entered a new epoch, the Anthropocene. In the Anthropocene, humans have become the main agents of not only change to the Earth System but also the driver of Earth System rupture, disruption of the Earth System's ability to be resilient and recover from that change, potentially ultimately threatening planetary habitability. The previous geological epoch, the Holocene began about 10,000 years ago. It is the current interglacial period, and was a relatively stable environment of the Earth. There have been natural environmental fluctuations during the Holocene, but the key atmospheric and biogeochemical parameters have remained within relatively narrow bounds. This stability has allowed societies to thrive worldwide, developing agriculture, large-scale settlements and complex networks of trade.

According to Rockström et al., we "have now become so dependent on those investments for our way of life, and how we have organized society, technologies, and economies around them, that we must take the range within which Earth System processes varied in the Holocene as a scientific reference point for a desirable planetary state."

Various biophysical processes that are important in maintaining the resilience of the Earth system are also undergoing large and rapid change because of human actions. For example, since the advent of the Anthropocene, the rate at which species are going extinct has increased over 100 times, and humans are now the driving force altering global river flows as well as water vapor flows from the land surface. Continuing perturbation of Earth system processes by human activities raises the possibility that further pressure could be destabilizing, leading to non-linear, abrupt, large-scale or irreversible environmental change responses by the Earth system within continental- to planetary-scale systems.

== Reception and debate ==
In summary, the planetary boundary concept is a very important one, and its proposal should now be followed by discussions of the connections between the various boundaries and of their association with other concepts such as the 'limits to growth'. Importantly, this novel concept highlights the risk of reaching thresholds or tipping points for non-linear or abrupt changes in Earth-system processes. As such, it can help society to reach the agreements required for dealing effectively with existing global environmental threats, such as climate change.

— Nobel laureate Mario J. Molina

The 2009 report was presented to the General Assembly of the Club of Rome in Amsterdam. An edited summary of the report was published as the featured article in a special 2009 edition of Nature alongside invited critical commentary from leading academics like Nobel laureate Mario J. Molina and biologist Cristián Samper.

Development studies scholars have been critical of aspects of the framework and constraints that its adoption could place on the Global South. Proposals to conserve a certain proportion of Earth's remaining forests can be seen as rewarding the countries such as those in Europe that have already economically benefited from exhausting their forests and converting land for agriculture. In contrast, countries that have yet to industrialize are asked to make sacrifices for global environmental damage they may have had little role in creating.

The biogeochemist William Schlesinger queries whether thresholds are a good idea for pollutions at all. He thinks waiting until we near some suggested limit will just permit us to continue to a point where it is too late. "Management based on thresholds, although attractive in its simplicity, allows pernicious, slow and diffuse degradation to persist nearly indefinitely."

In a global empirical study, researchers investigated how students of environmental and sustainability studies in 35 countries assessed the planetary boundaries. It was found that there are substantial global differences in the perception of planetary boundaries.

== Subsequent developments ==
=== The "safe and just space" doughnut ===
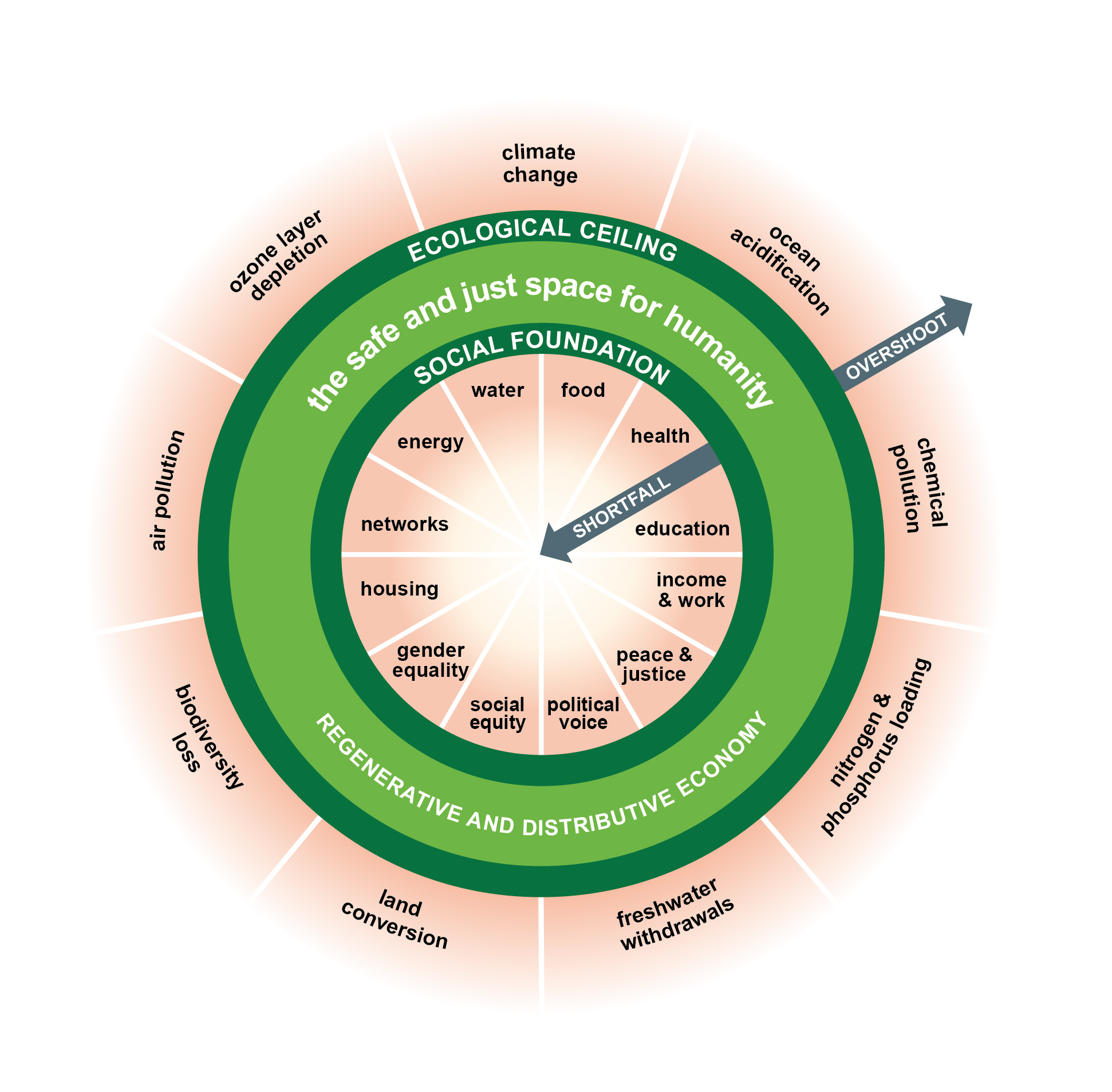
Doughnut (economic model)

The Doughnut, or Doughnut economics, is a visual framework for sustainable development – shaped like a doughnut or lifebelt – combining the concept of planetary boundaries with the complementary concept of social boundaries. The name derives from the shape of the diagram, i.e. a disc with a hole in the middle. The centre hole of the model depicts the proportion of people that lack access to life's essentials (healthcare, education, equity and so on) while the crust represents the ecological ceilings (planetary boundaries) that life depends on and must not be overshot. The diagram was developed by University of Oxford economist Kate Raworth in her 2012 Oxfam paper A Safe and Just Space for Humanity and elaborated upon in her 2017 book Doughnut Economics: Seven Ways to Think Like a 21st-Century Economist and paper.

=== National environmental footprints ===
Several studies have assessed environmental footprints of nations based on planetary boundaries: for Portugal, Sweden, Switzerland, the Netherlands, the European Union, India, many of Belt and Road Initiative countries as well as for the world's most important economies. While the metrics and allocation approaches applied varied, there is a converging outcome that resource use of wealthier nations – if extrapolated to world population – is not compatible with planetary boundaries.

=== Boundaries related to agriculture and food consumption ===
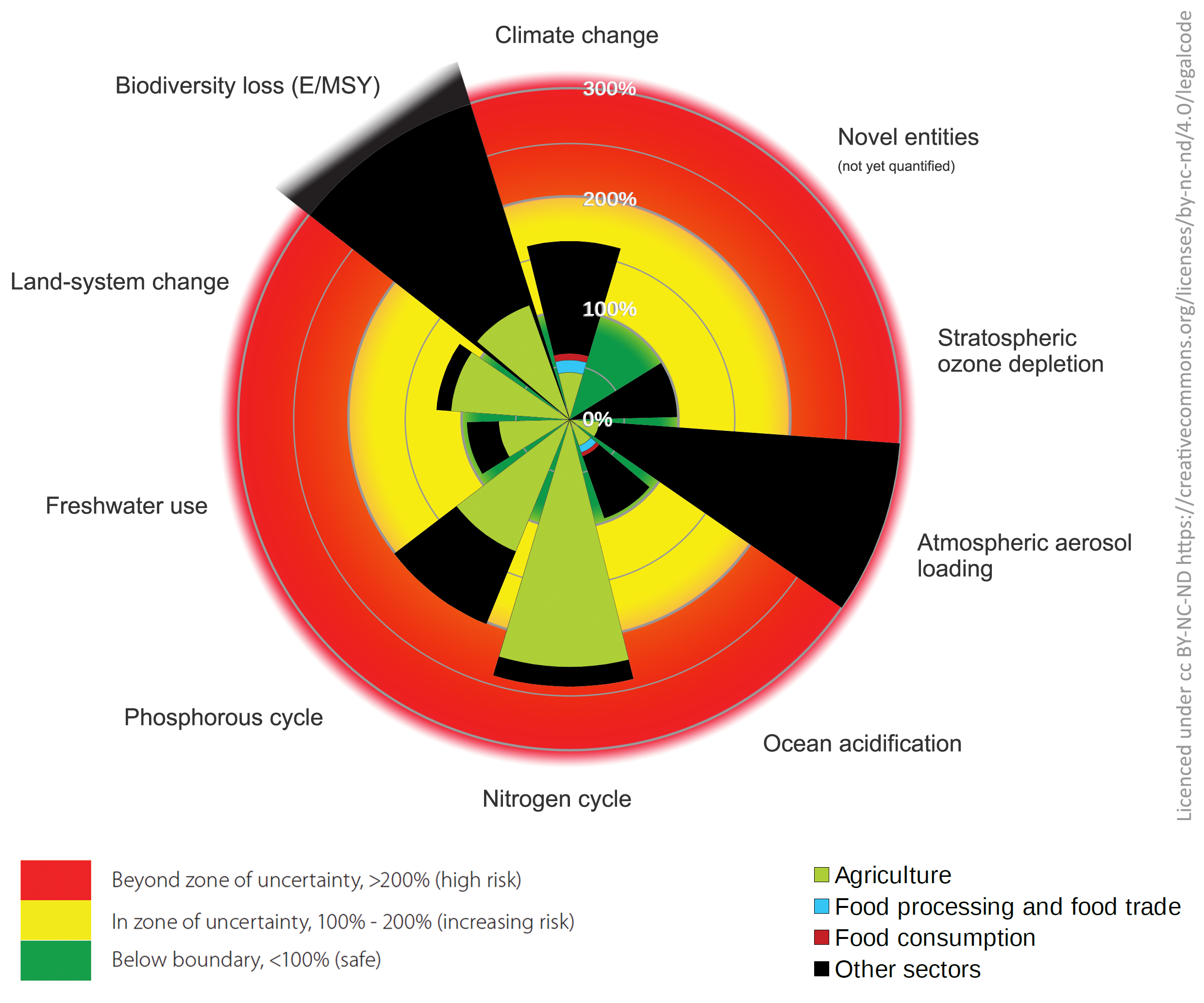
Visualization of the planetary boundaries related to agriculture and nutrition

Human activities related to agriculture and nutrition globally contribute to the transgression of four out of nine planetary boundaries. Surplus nutrient flows (N, P) into aquatic and terrestrial ecosystems are of highest importance, followed by excessive land-system change and biodiversity loss. Whereas in the case of biodiversity loss, P cycle and land-system change, the transgression is in the zone of uncertainty—indicating an increasing risk (yellow circle in the figure), the N boundary related to agriculture is more than 200% transgressed—indicating a high risk (red marked circle in the figure). Here, nutrition includes food processing and trade as well as food consumption (preparation of food in households and gastronomy). Consumption-related environmental impacts are not quantified at the global level for the planetary boundaries of freshwater use, atmospheric aerosol loading (air pollution) and stratospheric ozone depletion.

=== Individual and collective allowances ===
Approaches based on a general framework of ecological limits include (transferable) personal carbon allowances and "legislated" national greenhouse gas emissions limits. Consumers would have freedom in their (informed) choice within (the collective) boundaries.

== Usage at international policy level ==
=== United Nations ===
The United Nations secretary general Ban Ki-moon endorsed the concept of planetary boundaries on 16 March 2012, when he presented the key points of the report of his High Level Panel on Global Sustainability to an informal plenary of the UN General Assembly. Ban stated: "The Panel's vision is to eradicate poverty and reduce inequality, to make growth inclusive and production and consumption more sustainable, while combating climate change and respecting a range of other planetary boundaries." The concept was incorporated into the so-called "zero draft" of the outcome of the United Nations Conference on Sustainable Development to be convened in Rio de Janeiro 20–22 June 2012. However, the use of the concept was subsequently withdrawn from the text of the conference, "partly due to concerns from some poorer countries that its adoption could lead to the sidelining of poverty reduction and economic development. It is also, say observers, because the idea is simply too new to be officially adopted, and needed to be challenged, weathered and chewed over to test its robustness before standing a chance of being internationally accepted at UN negotiations."

In 2011, at their second meeting, the High-level Panel on Global Sustainability of the United Nations had incorporated the concept of planetary boundaries into their framework, stating that their goal was: "To eradicate poverty and reduce inequality, make growth inclusive, and production and consumption more sustainable while combating climate change and respecting the range of other planetary boundaries."

Elsewhere in their proceedings, panel members have expressed reservations about the political effectiveness of using the concept of "planetary boundaries": "Planetary boundaries are still an evolving concept that should be used with caution [...] The planetary boundaries question can be divisive as it can be perceived as a tool of the "North" to tell the "South" not to follow the resource intensive and environmentally destructive development pathway that rich countries took themselves... This language is unacceptable to most of the developing countries as they fear that an emphasis on boundaries would place unacceptable brakes on poor countries."

However, the concept is routinely used in the proceedings of the United Nations, and in the UN Daily News. For example, the United Nations Environment Programme (UNEP) Executive Director Achim Steiner states that the challenge of agriculture is to "feed a growing global population without pushing humanity's footprint beyond planetary boundaries." The UNEP Yearbook 2010 also repeated Rockström's message, conceptually linking it with ecosystem management and environmental governance indicators.

In their 2012 report entitled "Resilient People, Resilient Planet: A future worth choosing", The High-level Panel on Global Sustainability called for bold global efforts, "including launching a major global scientific initiative, to strengthen the interface between science and policy. We must define, through science, what scientists refer to as "planetary boundaries", "environmental thresholds" and "tipping points"".

=== European Commission ===
The planetary boundaries concept is also used in proceedings by the European Commission, and was referred to in the European Environment Agency synthesis report The European environment – state and outlook 2010.

== See also ==
- Ecological footprint
- Global catastrophic risk
- Global change
- Holocene extinction
- Human impact on the nitrogen cycle
- Human impacts on the environment
- Planetary health
- Planetary management
- Sustainability
- Triple Planetary Crisis
