= Otaua River =

Coordinates: 35°28′S 173°40′E

Location
- Country: New Zealand

Physical characteristics
- Mouth
  - location: Punakitere River

The Otaua River is a river of the Northland Region of New Zealand's North Island. It is a tributary of the Punakitere River, which it reaches 5 kilometres (3 mi) south of the latter's outflow into the Waima River

== See also ==
- List of rivers of New Zealand
