= Doughnut Economics: Seven Ways to Think Like a 21st-Century Economist =

2017 non-fiction book by economist Kate Raworth

- Author: Kate Raworth
- Original title: Doughnut Economics: Seven Ways to Think Like a 21st-Century Economist
- Set in: London
- Publisher: Random House
- Publication date: 2017
- Pages: 309
- ISBN: 1847941370
- OCLC: 1006404349

Doughnut Economics: Seven Ways to Think Like a 21st-Century Economist is a 2017 non-fiction book by Oxford economist Kate Raworth. The book elaborates on her concept of doughnut economics, first developed in her 2012 paper, A Safe and Just Space for Humanity.

== Background ==
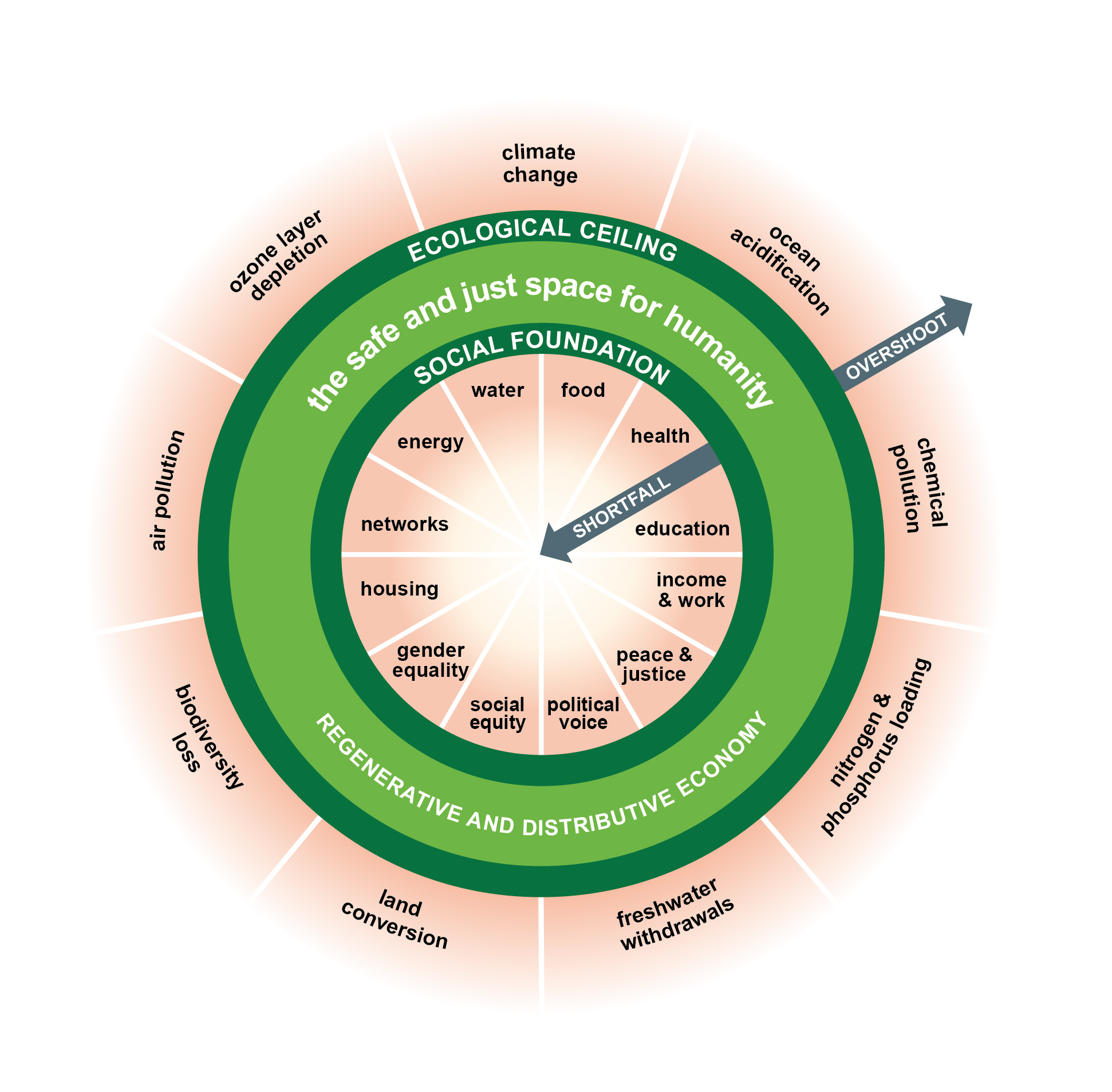
The model of doughnut economics

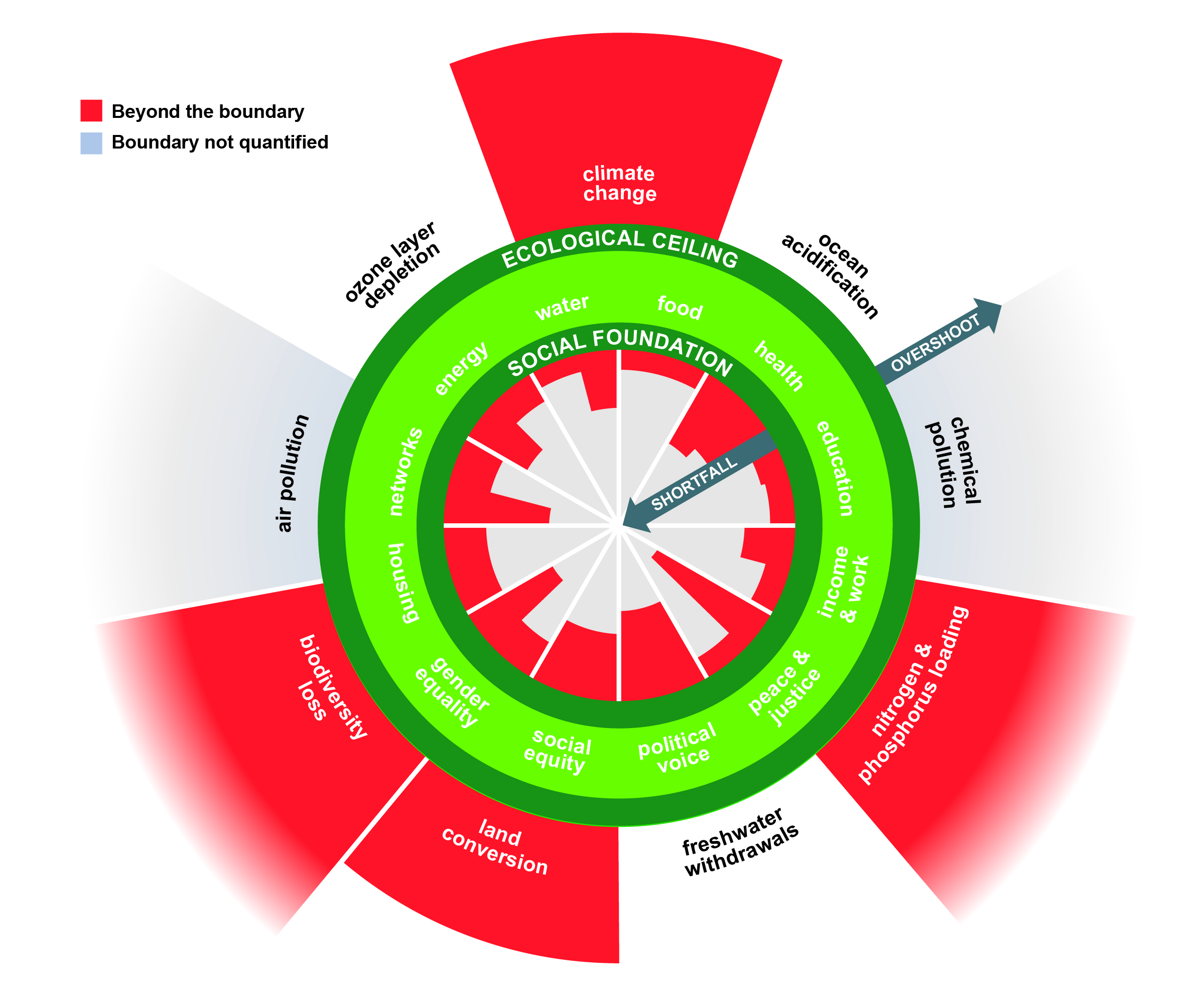
The doughnut model of the world economy, showing overshoot of ecological ceilings and shortfall of social foundations

Oxford economist Kate Raworth presented her 13 February 2012 Discussion Paper, "A Safe and Just Space for Humanity: Can we live within the Doughnut?", prior to the Rio+20 United Nations Conference on Sustainable Development. The doughnut-shaped visual framework illustrates a safe space between "planetary boundaries" and "social boundaries" in which "humanity can thrive."

== Contents ==
=== Who wants to be an Economist? ===
From the frustrations of students who don't find the answers in their taught courses, Raworth recounts some of her own experiences, from university to working in Zambia, writing the Human Development Report at the UN and deciding to start by looking at economics by its goals rather than its mechanisms. She also reflects on the power of images.

=== Change the Goal ===
By the end of the 1950s, output growth had become the overriding economic policy objective in industrial countries, with the concept of utility at its heart. It is normally represented by the Gross Domestic Product, despite the very partial picture this provides of the whole. Nobel economists Amartya Sen and Joseph Stiglitz and 23 other leading economists concluded that "those attempting to guide the economy and our society are like pilots trying to steer a course without a reliable compass". The Doughnut is an attempt to provide such a compass. The inner ring sets out 12 social foundations for humanity identified as sustainable development goals; the outer ring is formed of 9 planetary boundaries that earth system scientists have identified as being necessary for planetary stability. It replaces an impossible goal of endless growth by one of thriving in balance.

=== See the Big Picture ===
This chapter contrasts the standard neoliberal agenda staged by Samuelson's circular flow diagram and scripted by the Mont Pelerin Society of Friedman, Hayek et al., with the Embedded Economy which sets the economy within society and the living world. It points out that the economy's fundamental resource flow is not a roundabout of money, but a one-way street of energy. The economy also depends on a properly functioning society, households with all their unpaid elements, and the commons, which Elinor Ostrom had rescued from tragedy.

=== Nurture Human Nature ===
Rational economic man was a portrait sketched by Adam Smith—solitary, calculating, competing and insatiable—refined by John Stuart Mill, elaborated by Jevons and made into a cartoon character by Frank Knight, founder of the Chicago School, who endowed him with perfect knowledge and perfect foresight. But it turns out that homo sapiens is the most cooperative species on the planet and the economy develops via interdependency.

=== Get Savvy with Systems ===
From Alfred Marshall’s supply and demand graph of the 1870s, economists have preferred simple equations to express economic ideas. Prompted by the Great Recession, new dynamic models are being developed and there is a need for economists to work ethically.

=== Design to Distribute ===
Thomas Piketty finally destroyed the optimism of the Kuznets Curve which suggested that inequality would be automatically solved by rising affluence. As a consequence, issues including higher marginal rates of taxation and land value taxes need to be reconsidered. Other concerns include the digital revolution, robotics, intellectual property rights and the effect on the Global South.

=== Create to Regenerate ===
The fact that more advanced economies have at least partially solved pollution problems faced by developing societies led some economists to believe this was inevitable rather than a determined effort and used it to mock studies such as Limits to Growth. Industrial systems have been built around an extract-manufacture-use-throwaway sequence and economics has developed a system of quotas, taxes, and tiered pricing to alleviate the problems, although corporations lobby hard against them.

=== Be Agnostic about Growth ===
Although indefinite growth is the assumption of modern economics, it's rare to find an exponential graph in a textbook. Rostow's influential Five Stages of Growth pictures a plane journey whose fifth stage (the age of high mass consumption) leaves us in the air without a landing point. In practice, most natural systems follow an S-curve as a particular niche is filled. It is hard to predict a successful landing point for growth that meets the financial addiction to growth. Various ideas, such as Steady-state economy, demurrage currency, and breaking out of consumerism, are explored.

== Major themes ==
The hole or inner ring of the doughnut represents the space where those who lack the minimum requirement for leading a good life, reside. These minimum requirements are based on the UN's sustainable development goals (SDGs).

The outer ring of the doughnut "represents the ecological ceiling drawn up by earth-system scientists". Beyond that boundary, humankind damages the "climate, soils, oceans, the ozone layer, freshwater, and abundant biodiversity."

The dough in between is "where everyone's needs and that of the planet are being met."

== Reviews ==
Welfare economist Erik Schokkaert notes that Raworth raises important challenges for achieving a better development path, but does not address specifics such as which measure of well-being should replace GDP or how exactly to ensure decent material consumption for all while respecting planetary boundaries. He argues that her criticism targets a caricature of mainstream economics, making it a straw man. Although there is room for debate on issues such as methodological individualism, these are absent from the book. Schokkaert further observes that economic science has moved beyond simplistic assumptions and is increasingly empirically oriented, focusing on behavioral agents in imperfect markets influenced by non-monetary factors. His main concern is that Raworth’s book is an unfortunate and confusing mixture of positive (factual) and normative considerations, with policy prescriptions based largely on beliefs, hopes, and convictions, rather than on serious empirical analysis. Rather than rejecting mainstream economics, he suggests building coalitions with real mainstream economists who share her views that markets must be embedded in a broader societal context, account for resource constraints and power inequalities, and recognize that humans are motivated by more than self-interest and make decisions with limited rationality—perspectives already present in mainstream economics.

Branko Milanović of CUNY’s Stone Center on Socio-Economic Inequality criticises the book for ignoring that if everyone were to reach the current median income of rich countries, world GDP would need to triple—an issue Raworth does not address. He also notes that while the book lists many “green” initiatives, it never assesses their impact, which in reality is marginal compared to what is needed. Raworth acknowledges that economic growth helps ease distributional conflicts, sustain democracy, and support people’s well-being, but she fails to provide convincing arguments for how a “no-growth” regime could emerge—or how it could address these social and political challenges. It would require people "magically" to become indifferent to wealth and status—something he calls unrealistic. He concludes that the book relies on “miracles,” while neglecting the real miracle of China’s growth that lifted 700 million people from poverty.

Maria Zhivitskaya of the London School of Economics noted the book’s multidisciplinary promise and appealing metaphors, but remained unconvinced of the doughnut’s transformative potential. She argued that Raworth’s dismissal of the “rational economic man” was based on a weak reasoning, pointing out that using Daniel Kahneman’s work on cognitive biases to discredit economics as a discipline was unfair, given that Kahneman’s contributions were themselves recognised with a Nobel Prize in Economics. While Raworth's metaphors are flowery and appealing, they do not offer any real policy advice about how to tackle the complicated issues she highlights. Practical policy questions, such as tackling the complexities of integrated environmental and economic accounting, are outside the scope of her idealistic vision.

According to Richard Toye, "If you are familiar with the ideas of Hyman Minsky, Daniel Kahneman, Joseph Stiglitz and Ha-Joon Chang, you will not be in for too many surprises, but if not, this book serves as a compact synthesis of modern heterodoxy. Raworth’s distinct contribution is in her emphasis on environmental themes. Too many writers, even radical ones, tend to treat “the economy" and "the environment" as separate issues, even though they admit that one has an impact on the other. Yet, as she rightly stresses, the conventional notion of "externalities", or economic side effects, serves to imply that problems such as pollution are not ones that economists need to make central to their concerns.

Alex Bernhardt, Principal, US Responsible Investment Leader, Mercer, said "It contains an excoriating critique of neoclassical economic theory and proposes a compelling and elegant alternative to the growth-at-any-costs mentality pervading political-economic thinking and practice today. There is much to be said for the practicality of this framework from the standpoint of global policymakers and their economic advisors."

The University of Pennsylvania's Knowledge Wharton, said the book, Doughnut Economics offers a "mountaintop view of the world" with a central idea that "gross domestic product is an ineffective way to measure an economy because it's only one-dimensional."

== See also ==
- Doughnut (economic model)
