= Kate Raworth =

English economist (born 1970)

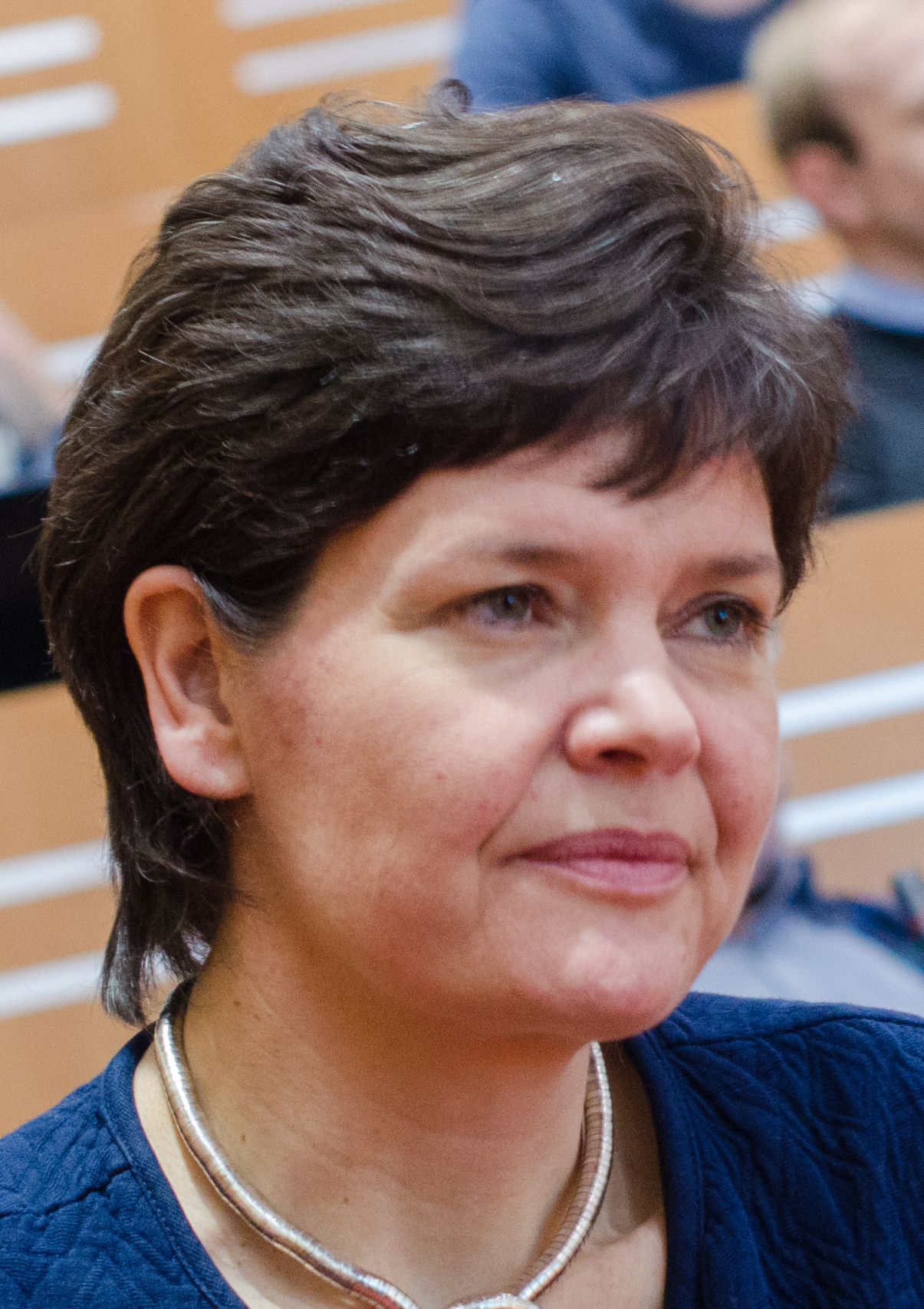
- Raworth in 2018
- Born: 13 December 1970 (age 55)
- Spouse: Roman Krznaric
- Relatives: Sophie Raworth (sister)

Academic background
- Education: University of Oxford (BA, MSc)
- Influences: Tim Jackson, Elinor Ostrom

Academic work
- Discipline: Ecological economics
- Institutions: University of Oxford; University of Cambridge
- Website: kateraworth.com

Kate Raworth (born 13 December 1970) is an English economist known for "doughnut economics", an economic model that balances between essential human needs and planetary boundaries. Raworth is senior associate at the University of Oxford's Environmental Change Institute and a Professor of Practice at Amsterdam University of Applied Sciences.

== Family and education ==
Raworth was born in 1970 to a florist mother and a businessman father; she has an older sister, Sophie. She grew up in Twickenham in Middlesex, and attended St Paul's Girls School. She then studied Politics, Philosophy and Economics at the University of Oxford, influenced by Andrew Graham. She achieved first-class honours, and followed this with an MSc degree in Development Economics.

== Career ==
For three years from 1995, Raworth worked to promote micro-enterprise development in Zanzibar as a fellow of the Overseas Development Institute. From 1997 to 2001, she was an economist and co-author of the United Nations Development Programme's Human Development Report, writing chapters on globalization, new technologies, resource consumption, and human rights. From 2002 to 2013, Raworth was a senior researcher at Oxfam. She is currently a senior research associate, tutor, and advisory board member of the Environmental Change Institute of the University of Oxford, a senior associate at the Cambridge Institute for Sustainability Leadership, and a member of the advisory board at the ZOE Institute for Future-fit Economies.

In 2017, Raworth published Doughnut Economics: Seven Ways to Think Like a 21st-Century Economist, which elaborates on her concept of doughnut economics, first developed in her 2012 paper, A Safe and Just Space for Humanity. Her 2017 book is a counter-proposal to mainstream economic thinking, and she advocates for conditions to create a sustainable economy. Raworth argues for a radical re-consideration of the foundations of economic science, and is particularly critical of the outdated principle of unfettered growth, in that it is destructive of planetary resources while ill-serving human needs including quality of life. Instead of focusing on the growth of the economy, Raworth focuses on a model where there can be ensured that everyone on earth has access to their basic needs, such as adequate food and education, while not limiting opportunities for future generations by protecting the ecosystem. The book was longlisted for the 2017 Financial Times and McKinsey Business Book of the Year Award.

In 2020, Raworth was inaugurated as professor of practice at Amsterdam University of Applied Sciences. In this role, she serves as a strategic advisor to the Doughnut Hub: a place where students, lecturers, and researchers, in collaboration with stakeholders in the Amsterdam area, develop knowledge based on the principles of her work.

In 2021, Raworth was appointed to the World Health Organization's Council on the Economics of Health for All, chaired by Mariana Mazzucato.

== Personal life ==
Raworth lives in Oxford. She is married to Roman Krznaric, an Australian philosopher. They met in New York, and are the parents of twins. Her sister Sophie Raworth is a BBC journalist and broadcaster.

Raworth holds an honorary doctorate from Business School Lausanne.

== See also ==
- Ecological economics
- Humanistic economics
- Critique of political economy
