= Kaikou River =

Coordinates: 35°38′S 174°02′E

Location
- Country: New Zealand

Physical characteristics
- Mouth
  - location: Hikurangi River
- Length: 25 km (16 mi)

The Kaikou River is a river of the Northland Region of New Zealand's North Island. It flows initially north, then east, and finally south, from its source approximately halfway between Dargaville and Kaikohe, before joining with the Moengawahine Stream to become the Hikurangi River.

== See also ==
- List of rivers of New Zealand
