= Hikurangi River =

Coordinates: 35°41′S 174°02′E

Location
- Country: New Zealand

Physical characteristics
- Source
  - location: Kaikou River and Moengawahine Stream
- Mouth
  - location: Mangakahia River
- Length: 7 km (4.3 mi)

The Hikurangi River is a river of Northland, New Zealand. A winding stretch of river, it can be considered an extension of the Kaikou River, being formed from the confluence of this river and the Moengawahine Stream. The Hikurangi flows south past the Pipiwai settlement for several kilometres before flowing into the Mangakahia River, 25 kilometres (16 mi) west of Whangārei.

== See also ==
- List of rivers of New Zealand
