= Waitangi River (Whangarei District) =

River on New Zealand's North Island

Location
- Country: New Zealand

Physical characteristics
- Mouth
  - location: Ngunguru Bay
  - coordinates: 35°40′00″S 174°30′32″E
- Length: 15 km (9.3 mi)

The Waitangi River is one of two so named in the Northland Region of New Zealand's North Island. It flows south then east from its origins in hills north of Whangārei, reaching the east coast at Ngunguru Bay, five kilometres south of Ngunguru.

== See also ==
- List of rivers of New Zealand
