= Phosphorus cycle =

Biogeochemical cycle

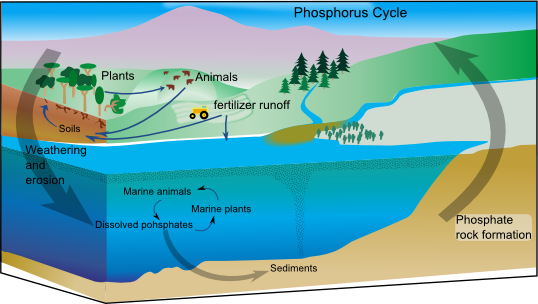
Phosphorus cycle

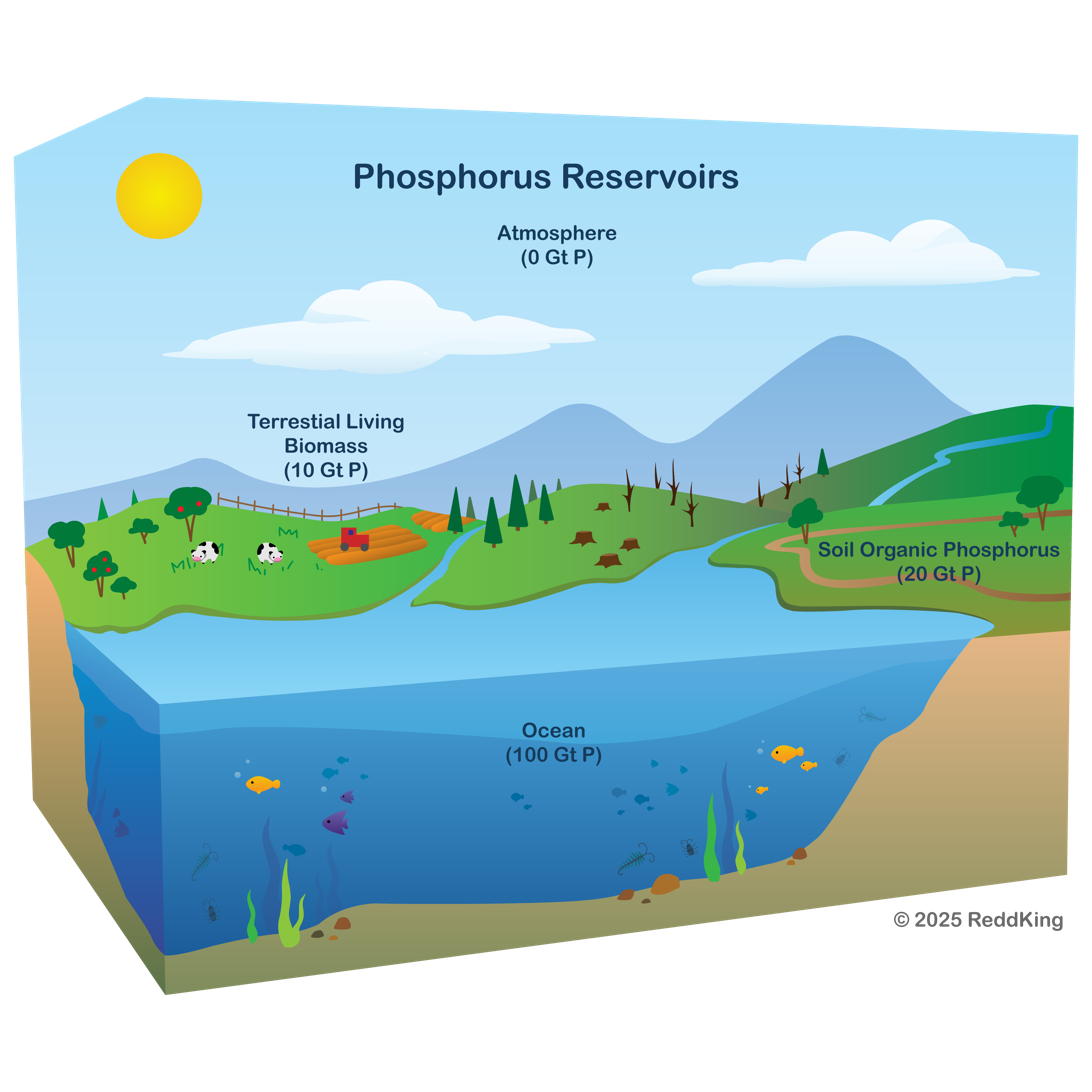
Phosphorus cycle reservoirs

The phosphorus cycle is the biogeochemical cycle that involves the movement of phosphorus through the lithosphere, hydrosphere, and biosphere. Unlike many other biogeochemical cycles, the atmosphere does not play a significant role in the movement of phosphorus, because phosphorus and phosphorus-based materials do not enter the gaseous phase readily, as the main source of gaseous phosphorus, phosphine, is only produced in isolated and specific conditions. Therefore, the phosphorus cycle is primarily examined studying the movement of orthophosphate (PO^{3−}_{4}), the form of phosphorus that is most commonly seen in the environment, through terrestrial and aquatic ecosystems.

Living organisms require phosphorus, a vital component of DNA, RNA, and ATP, for their proper functioning. Phosphorus also enters in the composition of phospholipids present in cell membranes. Plants assimilate phosphorus as phosphate and incorporate it into organic compounds. In animals, inorganic phosphorus in the form of apatite (Ca_{5}(PO_{4})_{3}(OH,F)) is also a key component of bones and teeth (tooth enamel). On the land, phosphorus gradually becomes less available to plants over thousands of years, since it is slowly lost in runoff. Low concentration of phosphorus in soils reduces plant growth and slows soil microbial growth, as shown in studies of soil microbial biomass. Soil microorganisms act as both sinks and sources of available phosphorus in the biogeochemical cycle. Short-term transformation of phosphorus is chemical, biological, or microbiological. In the long-term global cycle, however, the major transfer is driven by tectonic movement over geologic time and weathering of phosphate containing rock such as apatite. Furthermore, phosphorus tends to be a limiting nutrient in aquatic ecosystems. However, as phosphorus enters aquatic ecosystems, it has the possibility to lead to over-production in the form of eutrophication, which can happen in both freshwater and saltwater environments.

Human activities have caused major changes to the global phosphorus cycle primarily through the mining and subsequent transformation of phosphorus minerals for use in fertilizer and industrial products. Some phosphorus is also lost as effluent through the mining and industrial processes as well.

== Phosphorus in the environment ==
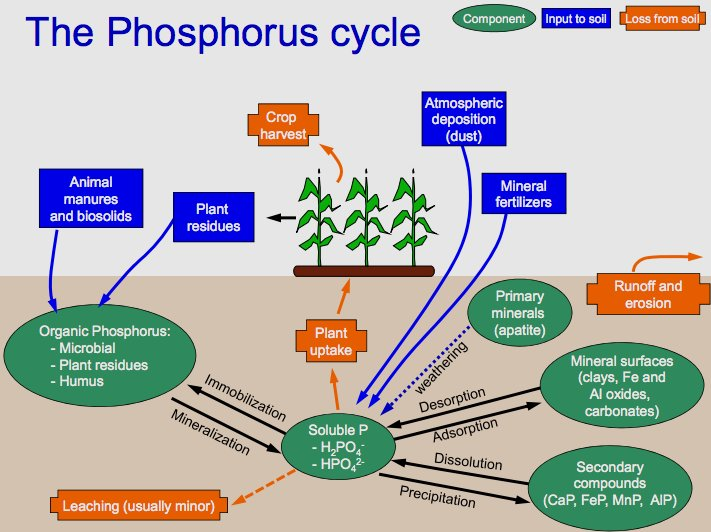
Phosphorus cycle on land

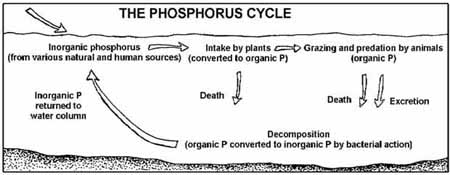
The aquatic phosphorus cycle

=== Ecological function ===
Phosphorus is an essential nutrient for plants and animals. It can be a limiting nutrient for aquatic organisms. Phosphates which are found in fertilizers, sewage and detergents, can cause pollution in lakes and streams. Over-enrichment of phosphate in both fresh and inshore marine waters can lead to massive algae blooms. In fresh water, the death and decay of these blooms leads to eutrophication. An example of this is the Canadian Experimental Lakes Area.

Freshwater algal blooms are generally caused by excess phosphorus, while those that take place in saltwater tend to result from excess nitrogen.

Phosphorus occurs most abundantly in nature as minerals containing orthophosphates (PO_{4})^{3−} and HPO_{4})^{2−}) consisting of a P atom and four oxygen atoms. Phosphorus-rich deposits have generally formed in the ocean or from guano, and over time, geologic processes bring ocean sediments to land. Weathering of rocks and minerals release phosphorus in a soluble form where it is taken up by plants, and it is transformed into organic compounds. The plants may then be consumed by herbivores and the phosphorus is either incorporated into their tissues or excreted. After death, the animal or plant decays, and phosphorus is returned to the soil where a large part of the phosphorus is transformed into insoluble compounds. Runoff may carry a small part of the phosphorus back to the ocean. Generally with time (thousands of years) soils become deficient in phosphorus leading to ecosystem retrogression.

==== Major pools in aquatic systems ====
There are four major pools of phosphorus in freshwater ecosystems: dissolved inorganic phosphorus (DIP), dissolved organic phosphorus (DOP), particulate inorganic phosphorus (PIP) and particulate organic phosphorus (POP). Dissolved material is defined as substances that pass through a 0.45 μm filter. DIP consists mainly of orthophosphate (PO^{3−}_{4}) and polyphosphate, while DOP consists of DNA and phosphoproteins. Particulate matter are the substances that get caught on a 0.45 μm filter and do not pass through. POP consists of both living and dead organisms, while PIP mainly consists of hydroxyapatite, Ca_{5}(PO_{4})_{3}OH . Inorganic phosphorus comes in the form of readily soluble orthophosphate. Particulate organic phosphorus occurs in suspension in living and dead protoplasm and is insoluble. Dissolved organic phosphorus is derived from the particulate organic phosphorus by excretion and decomposition and is soluble.

=== Biological function ===
The primary biological importance of phosphates is as a component of nucleotides, which serve as energy storage within cells (ATP) or when linked together, form the nucleic acids DNA and RNA. The double helix of our DNA is only possible because of the phosphate ester bridge that binds the helix. Besides making biomolecules, phosphorus is also found in bone and the enamel of mammalian teeth, whose strength is derived from calcium phosphate in the form of hydroxylapatite. It is also found in the exoskeleton of insects, and phospholipids (found in all biological membranes). It also functions as a buffering agent in maintaining acid base homeostasis in the human body.

=== Phosphorus cycling ===
Phosphates move quickly through plants and animals; however, the processes that move them through the soil or ocean are very slow, making the phosphorus cycle overall one of the slowest biogeochemical cycles.

The global phosphorus cycle includes four major processes:

(i) tectonic uplift and exposure of phosphorus-bearing rocks such as apatite to surface weathering;
(ii) physical erosion, and chemical and biological weathering of phosphorus-bearing rocks to provide dissolved and particulate phosphorus to soils, lakes and rivers;
(iii) riverine and subsurface transportation of phosphorus to various lakes and run-off to the ocean;
(iv) sedimentation of particulate phosphorus (e.g., phosphorus associated with organic matter and oxide/carbonate minerals) and eventually burial in marine sediments (this process can also occur in lakes and rivers).

In terrestrial systems, bioavailable P ('reactive P') mainly comes from weathering of phosphorus-containing rocks. The most abundant primary phosphorus-mineral in the crust is apatite, which can be dissolved by natural acids generated by soil microbes and fungi, or by other chemical weathering reactions and physical erosion. The dissolved phosphorus is bioavailable to terrestrial organisms and plants and is returned to the soil after their decay. Phosphorus retention by soil minerals (e.g., adsorption onto iron and aluminum oxyhydroxides in acidic soils and precipitation onto calcite in neutral-to-calcareous soils) is usually viewed as the most important process in controlling terrestrial P-bioavailability in the mineral soil. This process can lead to the low level of dissolved phosphorus concentrations in soil solution. Various physiological strategies are used by plants and microorganisms for obtaining phosphorus from this low level of phosphorus concentration.

Soil phosphorus is usually transported to rivers and lakes and can then either be buried in lake sediments or transported to the ocean via river runoff. Atmospheric phosphorus deposition is another important marine phosphorus source to the ocean. In surface seawater, dissolved inorganic phosphorus, mainly orthophosphate (PO^{3−}_{4}), is assimilated by phytoplankton and transformed into organic phosphorus compounds. Phytoplankton cell lysis releases cellular dissolved inorganic and organic phosphorus to the surrounding environment. Some of the organic phosphorus compounds can be hydrolyzed by enzymes synthesized by bacteria and phytoplankton and subsequently assimilated. The vast majority of phosphorus is remineralized within the water column, and approximately 1% of associated phosphorus carried to the deep sea by the falling particles is removed from the ocean reservoir by burial in sediments. A series of diagenetic processes act to enrich sediment pore water phosphorus concentrations, resulting in an appreciable benthic return flux of phosphorus to overlying bottom waters. These processes include

(i) microbial respiration of organic matter in sediments,
(ii) microbial reduction and dissolution of iron and manganese (oxyhydr)oxides with subsequent release of associated phosphorus, which connects the phosphorus cycle to the iron cycle, and
(iii) abiotic reduction of iron (oxyhydr)oxides by hydrogen sulfide and liberation of iron-associated phosphorus.

Additionally,

(iv) phosphate associated with calcium carbonate and
(v) transformation of iron oxide-bound phosphorus to vivianite play critical roles in phosphorus burial in marine sediments.

These processes are similar to phosphorus cycling in lakes and rivers.

Although orthophosphates (HPO^{2−}_{4}, H_{2}PO^{−}_{4}) are dominant inorganic P species in nature, certain microorganisms can use phosphonate and reduced phosphorus compounds as a P source.

=== Phosphatic minerals ===
The availability of phosphorus in an ecosystem is restricted by its rate of release during weathering. The release of phosphorus from apatite dissolution is a key control on ecosystem productivity. The primary mineral with significant phosphorus content, apatite [Ca_{5}(PO_{4})_{3}OH] undergoes carbonation.

Little of this released phosphorus is taken up by biota, as it mainly reacts with other soil minerals. This leads to phosphorus becoming unavailable to organisms in the later stage of weathering and soil development as it will precipitate into rocks. Available phosphorus is found in a biogeochemical cycle in the upper soil profile, while phosphorus found at lower depths is primarily involved in geochemical reactions with secondary minerals. Plant growth depends on the rapid root uptake of phosphorus released from dead organic matter in the biochemical cycle. Phosphorus is limited in supply for plant growth. Phosphates move quickly through plants and animals; however, the processes that move them through the soil or ocean are very slow, making the phosphorus cycle overall one of the slowest biogeochemical cycles.

Low-molecular-weight (LMW) organic acids are found in soils. They originate from the activities of various microorganisms in soils or may be exuded from the roots of living plants. Several of those organic acids are capable of forming stable organo-metal complexes with various metal ions found in soil solutions. As a result, these processes may lead to the release of inorganic phosphorus associated with aluminum, iron, and calcium in soil minerals. The production and release of oxalic acid by mycorrhizal fungi explain their importance in maintaining and supplying phosphorus to plants.

The availability of organic phosphorus to support microbial, plant and animal growth depends on the rate of their degradation to generate free phosphate. There are various enzymes such as phosphatases, nucleases and phytase involved for the degradation. Some of the abiotic pathways in the environment studied are hydrolytic reactions and photolytic reactions. Enzymatic hydrolysis of organic phosphorus is an essential step in the biogeochemical phosphorus cycle, including the phosphorus nutrition of plants and microorganisms and the transfer of organic phosphorus from soil to bodies of water. Many organisms rely on the soil derived phosphorus for their phosphorus nutrition.

=== Dust Storms ===
P deposition is quite important for ecosystem function, and is unevenly distributed across the planet. Although phosphorus does not have a major atmospheric component, phosphorus sediments can be moved during dust storms. Large dust events can counteract natural imbalances where P occurs and allow for production in areas that would otherwise be P-limited. Most of Earth's phosphorus is in rocks, and dust contains weathered rock particles from this parent material. Dust also carries other nutrients such as potassium, calcium, and magnesium, making these storms of high importance to biogeochemical cycling.

The source of most large-scale dust storms are arid climates, including the Sahara Desert. Phosphorus carried in by wind from Northern Africa to the Amazon basin is thought to play a significant role supporting the rich biodiversity of the Amazon rainforest.

These events are called dust-loading. Smaller scale dust-loading events have been found to occur in midwestern US, where erosion of agricultural land provides ideal conditions for dust storms. As the frequency of these dust storms increases, the amount of P left in the actual agricultural plots declines, leading to an increase of P fertilizer application. Retention of plant-available P becomes more difficult as erosion increases.

=== Eutrophication ===
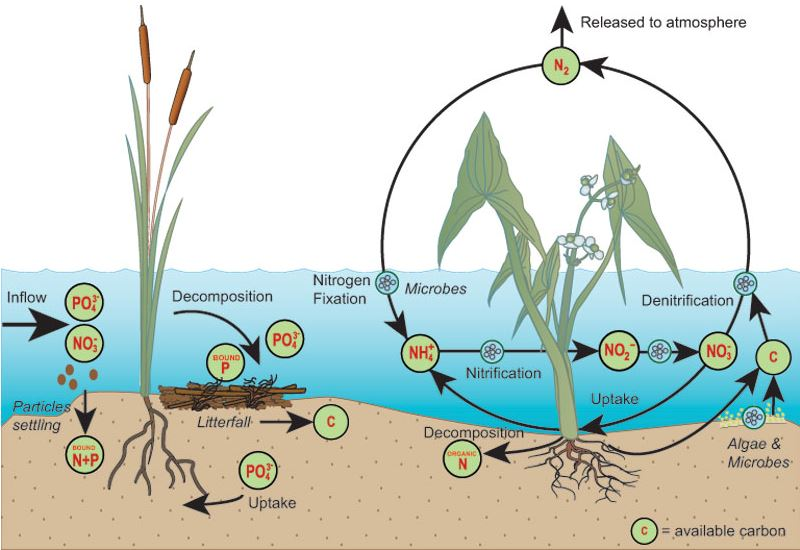
Nitrogen and phosphorus cycles in a wetland

Eutrophication occurs when waters are enriched by nutrients that lead to structural changes to the aquatic ecosystem such as algae bloom, deoxygenation, reduction of fish species. It does occur naturally, as when lakes age they become more productive due to increases in major limiting reagents such as nitrogen and phosphorus. For example, phosphorus can enter into lakes where it will accumulate in the sediments and the biosphere. It can also be recycled from the sediments and the water system allowing it to stay in the environment. Anthropogenic effects can also cause phosphorus to flow into aquatic ecosystems as seen in drainage water and runoff from fertilized soils on agricultural land. Additionally, eroded soils, which can be caused by deforestation and urbanization, can lead to more phosphorus and nitrogen being added to these aquatic ecosystems. These all increase the amount of phosphorus that enters the cycle which has led to excessive nutrient intake in freshwater systems causing dramatic growth in algal populations. When these algae die, their putrefaction depletes the water of oxygen and can toxify the waters. Both these effects cause plant and animal death rates to increase as the plants take in and animals drink the poisonous water.

==== Saltwater ====
Oceanic ecosystems gather phosphorus through many sources, but it is mainly derived from weathering of rocks containing phosphorus which are then transported to the oceans in a dissolved form by river runoff. Due to a dramatic rise in mining for phosphorus, it is estimated that humans have increased the net storage of phosphorus in soil and ocean systems by 75%. This increase in phosphorus has led to more eutrophication in ocean waters manifested as phytoplankton blooms.

==== Wetland ====
Wetlands are frequently applied to solve the issue of eutrophication. Nitrate is transformed in wetlands to free nitrogen and discharged to the air. Phosphorus is adsorbed by wetland soils which are taken up by the plants. Therefore, wetlands could help to reduce the concentration of nitrogen and phosphorus to remit eutrophication. However, wetland soils can only hold a limited amount of phosphorus. To remove phosphorus continually, it is necessary to add more new soils within the wetland from remnant plant stems, leaves, root debris, and undecomposable parts of dead algae, bacteria, fungi, and invertebrates.

=== Interaction with nitrogen ===
Both N and P are widely used in agricultural fertilizers, as they are essential nutrients for plants. Human activity has resulted in an imbalance of normal N:P ratios, impacting the speed at which organisms synthesize proteins and DNA. In the last 40 years, the N:P ratio has increased from 19:1 to 30:1, meaning P is less available to ecosystems. This imbalance is not only caused by more N pollution, but also because P is more likely to get trapped after water has been treated, preventing its release into ecosystems.

In an environment where neither nutrient is limited, where more P is present per N, organisms experience a faster growth rate. As this ratio increases, it is harder for organisms to grow. One example of organism response to this growing imbalance is rhizobia in legume root nodules. Research has shown that in low levels of P, the capacity for nitrogen-fixing bacteria to provide nutrients to the plant declines, negatively impacting both the host plant and its symbionts. In addition, plants growing in P-limited environments will have more N content in their leaves.

P and N are also unequally distributed across the globe, making certain geographical areas more favorable for crop growth than others. Disruption to these major biogeochemical cycles may exacerbate these inequities.

== Human influences ==
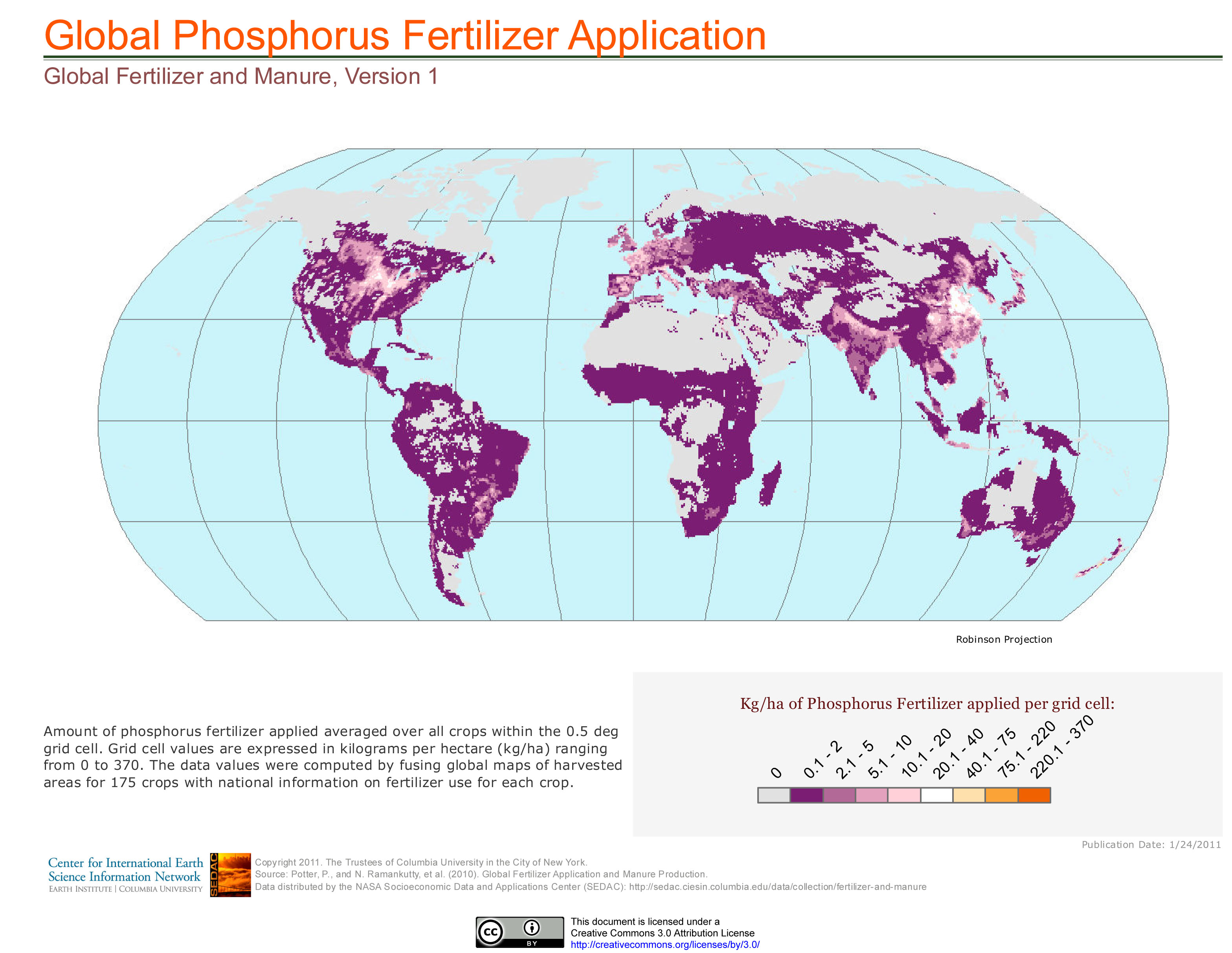
Phosphorus fertilizer application

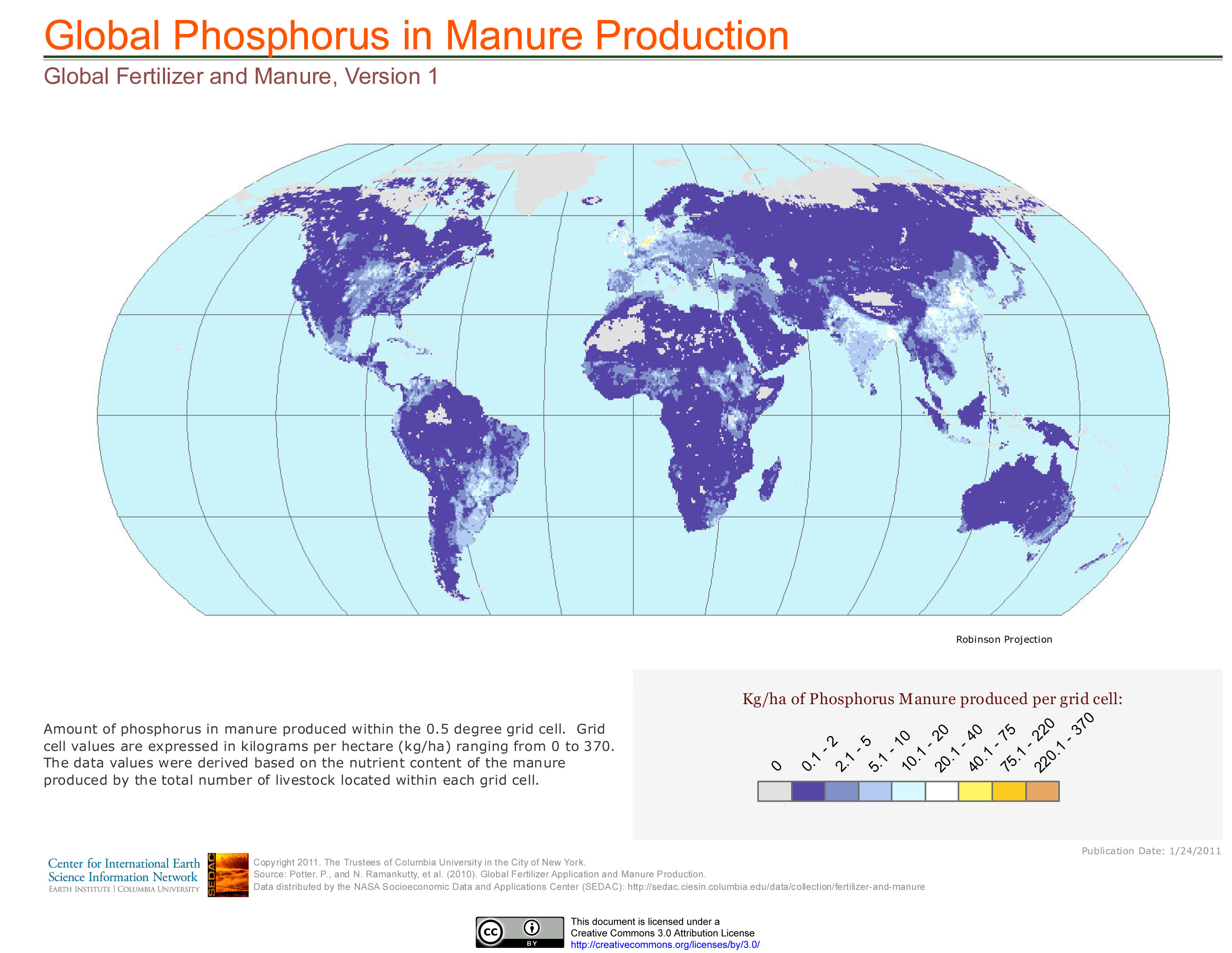
Phosphorus in manure production

Nutrients are important to the growth and survival of living organisms, and hence are essential for developing and maintaining healthy ecosystems. Humans have greatly influenced the phosphorus cycle by mining phosphate rock. For millennia, phosphorus was primarily brought into the environment by weathering phosphate-containing rocks, which would replenish the phosphorus normally lost to the environment through processes such as runoff, albeit on a very slow and gradual time scale. Since the 1840s, when the technology to mine and extract phosphorus became more prevalent, approximately 110 teragrams of phosphorus has been added to the environment. This trend appears to be continuing, as from 1900 to 2022, the amount of phosphorus mined globally has increased 72-fold, with an expected annual increase of 4%. Most of this mining is done to produce fertilizers which can be used on a global scale. However, at the rate humans are mining, the geological system can not quickly restore what is lost.

Other human processes can have detrimental effects on the phosphorus cycle, such as the repeated application of liquid hog manure in excess to crops. Applying biosolids may also increase available phosphorus in soil. In poorly drained soils or in areas where snowmelt can cause periodic waterlogging, reducing conditions can be attained in 7–10 days. This causes a sharp increase in phosphorus concentration in solution, and phosphorus can be leached. In addition, reducing the soil causes a shift in phosphorus from resilient to more labile forms. This could eventually increase the potential for phosphorus loss. This is of particular concern for the environmentally sound management of such areas, where disposal of agricultural wastes has already become a problem. It is suggested that soil water regimes used for organic waste disposal be considered when preparing waste management regulations.

== See also ==
- Planetary boundaries
- Oceanic carbon cycle
