= Marine Ecosystem Assessment for the Southern Ocean =

The Marine Ecosystem Assessment for the Southern Ocean (MEASO) is a collaborative initiative launched in 2018, involving more than 200 scientists from 19 countries, with diverse representation, striving to comprehensively evaluate the status and changes in Southern Ocean ecosystems and the underlying factors driving these transformations. MEASO is a key component of the Integrating Climate and Ecosystem Dynamics in the Southern Ocean (ICED) program, which falls under the umbrella of Integrated Marine Biosphere Research (IMBER), jointly operated by the Scientific Committee on Oceanic Research (SCOR) and Future Earth. It is also supported by the Scientific Committee on Antarctic Research (SCAR) and the Southern Ocean Observing System (SOOS). The MEASO initiative serves as a valuable resource for policymakers, scientists, and the general public interested in the Southern Ocean's ecological well-being and its ever-changing dynamics.

== Aims ==
MEASO aims to comprehensively evaluate the status and changes in Southern Ocean ecosystems and the underlying factors driving these transformations. It does not give specific scientific requirements for year to year management, but long-term assessments, and continues previous works such as the Biogeographic Atlas of the Southern Ocean.

== MEASO 2018 ==
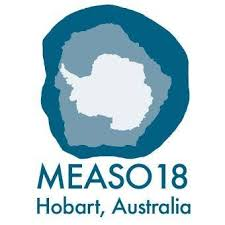
MEASO 2018

MEASO 2018 was an international conference held in Hobart in early April 2018, which included a day-long policy forum. Background to the conference, including the program and abstracts, can be found on the www.MEASO2018.aq conference web site. The conference was supported by Integrated Marine Biosphere Research (IMBeR) ICED and CLIOTOP, Southern Ocean Observing System (SOOS), Scientific Committee on Antarctic Research, and the Australian Antarctic Program to share science, enhance community input into design and planning of the MEASO, and to develop a work plan.

175 people attended from 23 countries, including scientists, policy-makers, fishing industry, and environmental NGOs. The conference was focused on four themes: (i) assessments of parts of the ecosystem; (ii) responses of biota to changing environments; (iii) methods for modelling habitats, species and food webs; (iv) design of observing systems to measure change in the ecosystem. The day-long policy forum discussed how to better link scientists, policy makers, industry and environmental NGOs and the public at large.

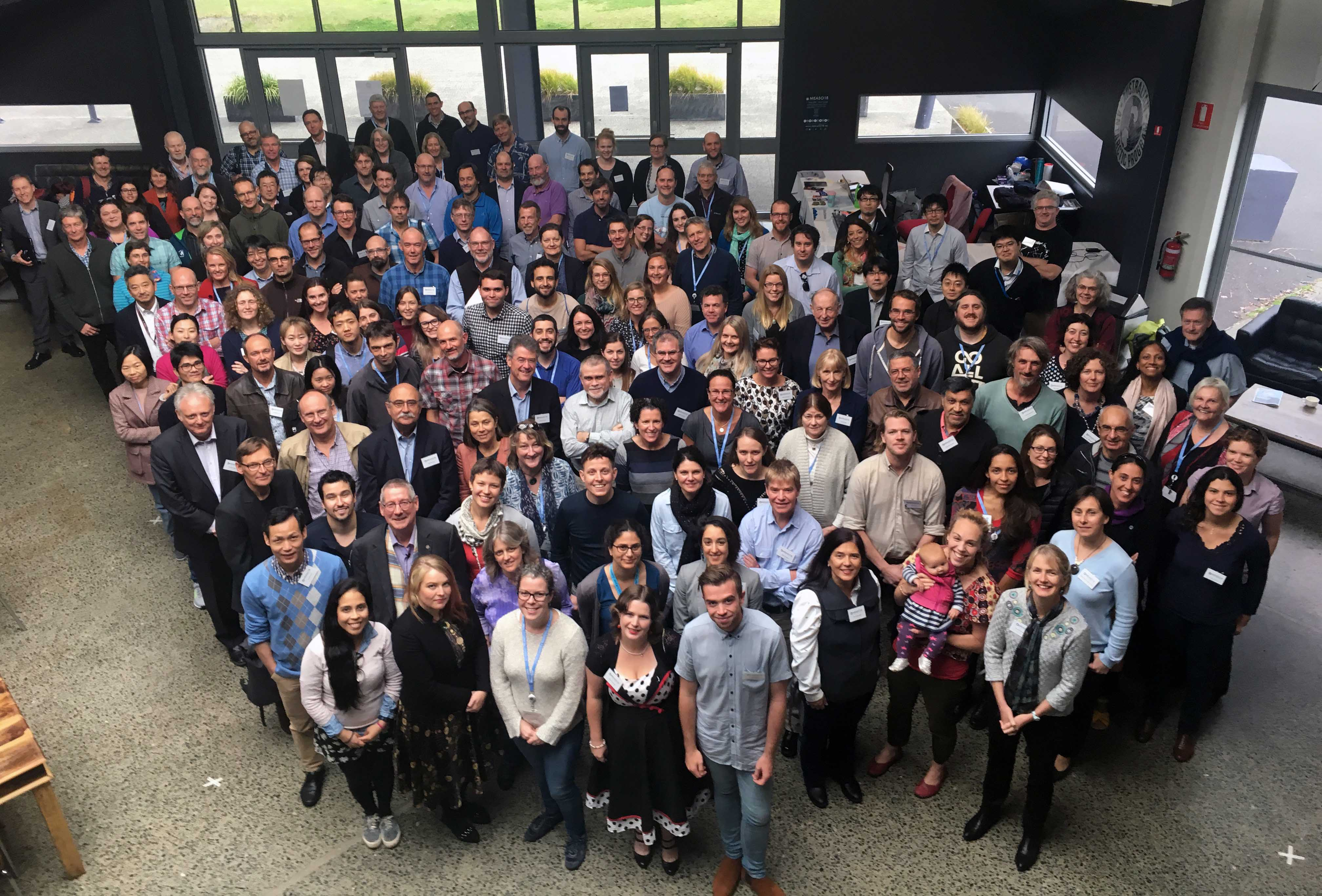
Attendees of the MEASO 2018 Conference, Hobart Australia

== MEASO 2019 ==
A MEASO workshop was held at the World Wide Fund for Nature British headquarters in Woking, UK from the 3–7 June 2019. It focused on planning the delivery of the first MEASO for 2020. This workshop was attended by 30 international scientists including scientists from 12 countries and 7 early career scientists.

== First Assessment ==
The first Marine Ecosystem Assessment for the Southern Ocean was a five-year inclusive international program, modelled on a working group of the Intergovernmental Panel on Climate Change. It involved 203 scientists from across the Antarctic and Southern Ocean scientific community (19 countries, 51% female, 30% early career), contributing to 24 research articles published in a special research topic in Frontiers Media journals.

A MEASO summary for policymakers was developed by members of the MEASO Steering Committee and the lead authors of the core papers as a synthesis of key findings from papers in the Research Topic, in plain language and developed for policy- and decision-makers in managing Southern Ocean ecosystems. Infographics from the original papers were adapted and presented as part of the summary for policymakers. The text of the key findings was translated into Dutch, French, Portuguese and Spanish to increase accessibility.
