= Anna Wåhlin =

Swedish Antarctic oceanographer

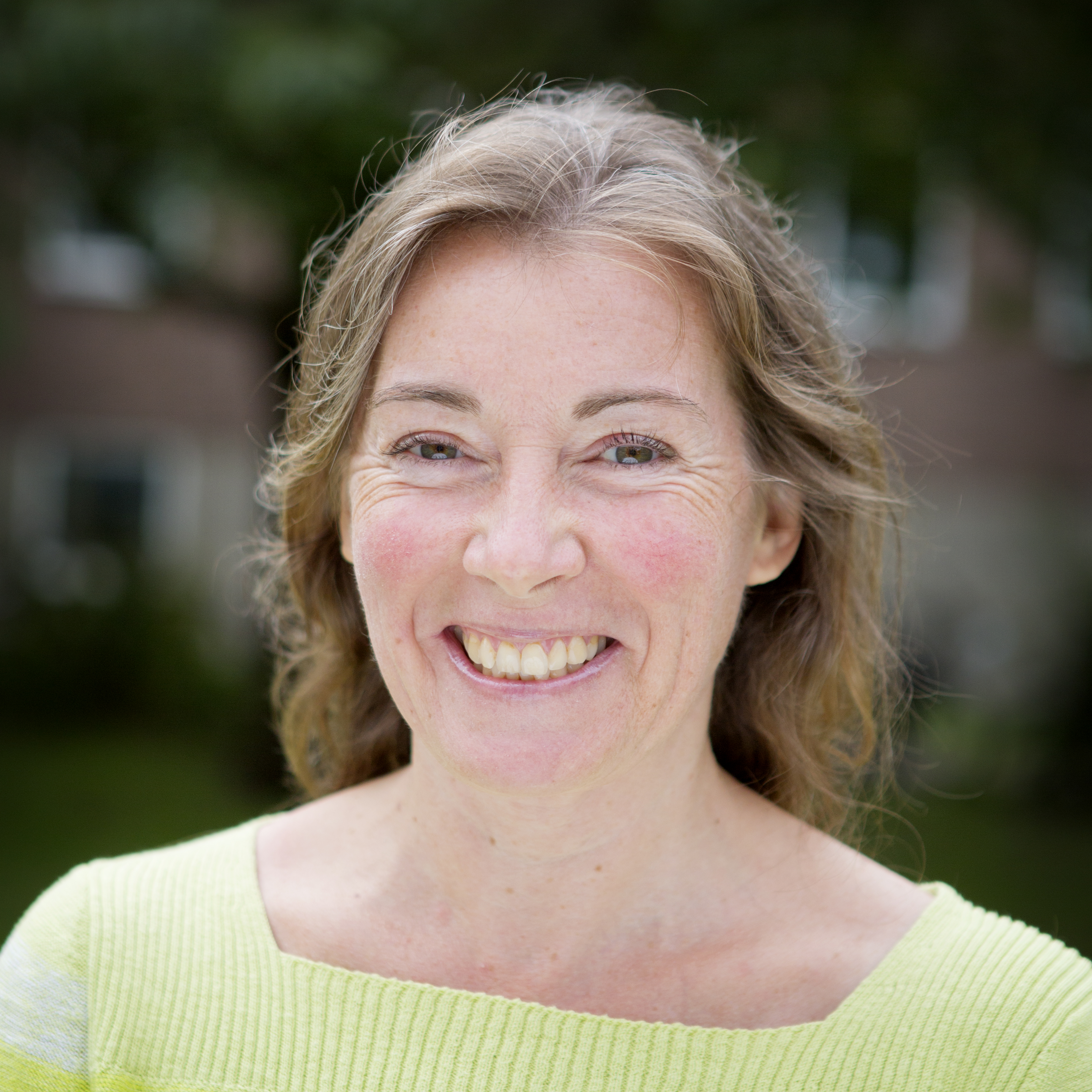
- Born: 1970 (age 55–56); Gothenburg, Sweden
- Education: PhD, Department of Earth Sciences, University of Gothenburg (2001)
- Scientific career
- Fields: Polar oceanography
- Workplaces: University of Gothenburg
- Website: Anna Wåhlin at the University of Gothenburg

Anna Wåhlin is a Swedish researcher on the Antarctic and the polar seas. She is a professor of physical oceanography at the University of Gothenburg and former co-chair of the Southern Ocean Observing System.

== Early life and education ==
Wåhlin was born in 1970 in Gothenburg, Sweden. She completed her undergraduate degree at the University of Gothenburg in the Department of Oceanography and completed her PhD in 2001 from the Department of Earth Sciences. Wåhlin was then a post-doc at the University of Oslo Department of Geophysics from 2003 to 2006.

== Career and impact ==
Wåhlin is a Professor of Physical Oceanography at the Department of Marine Sciences, University of Gothenburg. Her research focus is in the field of Polar Oceanography, mostly in the Southern Ocean. Specifically her research investigates several aspects of dynamics of polar seas including physical oceanography, ocean circulation, topographic effects, ice shelf melt processes and air-sea-ice interaction. When Wåhlin was appointed professor in 2015 she became Sweden's first woman full Professor of Oceanography.

Wåhlin is co-chair of the joint Scientific Committee on Antarctic Research (SCAR) and Scientific Committee on Oceanic Research (SCOR) initiative Southern Ocean Observing System. She is an associate editor of the journal, Advances in Polar Science and was a member of IOW scientific advisory board (2016-2019).

== Awards and honours ==
Wåhlin's awards include being a Fulbright Scholar (2007-2008), receiving a Crafoord Research Stipend from the Swedish Royal Academy of Science (2010) and being a SCAR visiting professor (2013). She received Albert Wallin science prize from the Royal Society of Arts and Sciences (KKVS) in Gothenburg 2018.

== Personal life ==
Anna has 2 daughters, Julia and Ellinor.

== Selected works ==
- Rebesco, M., Hernández-Molina, F.J., Van Rooij, D. and Wåhlin, A., 2014. Contourites and associated sediments controlled by deep-water circulation processes: state-of-the-art and future considerations. Marine Geology, 352, pp. 111–154.
- Arndt, J.E., Schenke, H.W., Jakobsson, M., Nitsche, F.O., Buys, G., Goleby, B., Rebesco, M., Bohoyo, F., Hong, J., Black, J. and Greku, R et al. 2013. The International Bathymetric Chart of the Southern Ocean (IBCSO) Version 1.0—A new bathymetric compilation covering circum-Antarctic waters. Geophysical Research Letters, 40(12), pp. 3111–3117.
- Rebesco, M., Wåhlin, A., Laberg, J.S., Schauer, U., Beszczynska-Möller, A., Lucchi, R.G., Noormets, R., Accettella, D., Zarayskaya, Y. and Diviacco, P., 2013. Quaternary contourite drifts of the Western Spitsbergen margin. Deep-Sea Research Part I: Oceanographic Research Papers, 79, pp. 156–168.
