= International Quiet Ocean Experiment =

- Abbreviation: IQOE
- Formation: 2015
- Founder: The Scientific Committee on Oceanic Research (SCOR) Partnership for Observation of the Global Ocean (POGO)
- Website: https://www.iqoe.org

The International Quiet Ocean Experiment (IQOE) is a global scientific research program aimed at improving understanding of the distributions of sounds in the ocean, and studying the effects of underwater noise pollution on marine life. The program has worked on promoting research, observations, and modelling to advance understanding of ocean soundscapes and the effects of sound on marine organisms. The IQOE was launched in 2015 by the Scientific Committee on Oceanic Research (SCOR) and the Partnership for Observation of the Global Ocean (POGO). The program comprises an international consortium of scientists, industry partners, and governmental organizations working together to further understanding of the impact of underwater noise on the ocean environment.

== History ==
The idea for the IQOE first took shape in 2011 during a workshop hosted by the Scientific Committee on Oceanic Research (SCOR) and the Partnership for Observation of the Global Ocean (POGO). This workshop brought together scientists from various disciplines and countries who recognized the need for a coordinated global effort to understand the effects of underwater noise.

== Products ==
IQOE groups have produced a variety of products to accomplish the goals of the project:

- IQOE Science Plan—Published in 2015, the IQOE Science Plan provides the scientific and societal rationales for the project and lays out actions designed to accomplish project goals. The plan is based on an open science meeting held in Paris, France in 2011 at the Intergovernmental Oceanographic Commission headquarters.
- IQOE Newsletters—IQOE documents its activities and progress in 2-3 newsletters released each year.
- Guidelines for Observation of Ocean Sound—This workshop report compiles the work of several IQOE-endorsed projects, as well as the IQOE WG on Standardization to recommend standards for passive ocean acoustic observations.
- Listening forward: approaching marine biodiversity assessments using acoustic methods—This paper was produced by the IQOE Working Group on Acoustic Measurement of Ocean Biodiversity Hotspots to document the state of the science on using bioacoustic metrics to estimate marine biodiversity.
