= David L. Downie =

David Leonard Downie (born 1961) is an American scholar focusing on international environmental politics and policy. He is currently Vice-Provost at Fairfield University.

== Research and writings ==
Downie's research focuses on factors that can promote or impede the creation, implementation and effectiveness of international environmental policy. This includes frameworks of scientific knowledge, patterns of economic interests, extant institutions and regime development as well as obstacles that stem from: the structures and interaction of the international political, legal, ecological and economic systems; common procedures employed in environmental policy making; characteristics of international environmental issues themselves; and the need to implement and fund internationally developed rules, norms and policies on the national and local level.

His research also examines global efforts to prevent stratospheric ozone depletion, address global climate change, and restrict anthropogenic emissions of mercury and of toxic chemicals known as persistent organic pollutants (POPs). He has attended dozens of global negotiations on these topics. At many of the meetings associated with the ozone layer, mercury and POPs, he worked with the Secretariat as part of the team that drafted the official negotiation reports. For his informal work with the Ozone Secretariat at negotiations, particularly in the mid-to-late 1990s, and his scholarly writing on global ozone policy, he was nominated and awarded inclusion in the Montreal Protocol Who’s Who, a collection created by the United Nations Environment Programme’s OzonAction unit

Downie's recent research also studies gender patterns amongst those elevated to senior leadership positions in global environmental politics and inter-governmental organizations. He has also been a long-time advocate of examining opportunities to replace local, state, and national taxes paid by the lower and middle classes with taxes on pollution. The author of numerous publications on a variety of topics, his co-authored book, Global Environmental Politics, written with Professor Pamela Chasek (a co-creator of the Earth Negotiations Bulletin), is in its 9th edition.

== Academia career ==
Downie joined the Environmental Studies Program and the Politics Department at Fairfield University in 2008. Prior to moving to Fairfield University, Downie taught courses in international environmental politics at Columbia University from 1994-2008. While at Columbia, he held several research, administrative and academic appointments in the Earth Institute, School of International and Public Affairs, and Department of Political Science, including: Associate Director of the Graduate Program in Climate and Society (2004-2008), Director of the Global Roundtable on Climate Change (2004–2008), and Director of Environmental Policy Studies at the School of International and Public Affairs (1994–1999). In 2000 he moved from a primary appointment at the School of International and Public Affairs to one at the Earth Institute (in order to focus on applied policy research and creating and expanding new interdisciplinary educational programs.

The Global Roundtable on Climate Change brought together representatives from corporations, research institutions, and government organizations to discuss the scientific consensus, economics, technology, and public policy issues associated with climate change. Following preliminary research and discussions, the group first met in 2005 and held a series of public and private meetings over the next five years. As part of this work, Downie organized two side-event panels during sessions of the global climate negotiations that featured presentations by Roundtable Participants, including himself, and also discussed the climate policy, the Roundtable, and related issues at other events during the climate negotiations and in other forums.

Fairfield's environmental studies program now includes faculty and classes from many different departments and schools, including Anthropology, Applied Ethics, Biology, Business, Chemistry, Economics, English, Engineering, Environmental Studies, Philosophy, Politics, and Physics. Fairfield University has received recognition for its sustainability efforts, including the Sierra Club naming it as one of the nation's "Cool Schools" and the Princeton Review including Fairfield in its 2010 "Guide to 286 Green Colleges." The United States Environmental Protection Agency (EPA) honored the university with a 2010 Energy Star CHP Award for its energy smart CHP. In 2011, Downie accepted a Green Coast Award given to Fairfield University on behalf of its sustainability efforts.

== Education ==
His education includes a B.A. in Philosophy from Duke University and a Ph.D. in Political Science from the University of North Carolina at Chapel Hill. He attended high school at the Blake School in Minneapolis, Minnesota.

== Personal life ==
David Downie is the son of Leonard Downie, Jr., Executive Editor of the Washington Post from 1991–2008, and Barbara Sims, an environmental attorney. The couple divorced in the early 1970s and Ms. Sims married Carl Sims, a newspaper editor (Mr. Sims died in 2020). In 1992, Downie married Dr. Laura Whitman. Downie and Whitman are the parents of two children, William Whitman Downie and Lindsey Whitman Downie. Dr. Whitman, who died in January 2023 after a long illness, was highly regarded clinician, mentor, and leader at Yale School of Medicine, and a noted specialist in out-patient medical education at Yale University. In November 2023, the Generalist Firm at Yale New Haven Hospital was renamed the Laura Whitman Firm in honor and memory of Dr. Whitman.

Laura Whitman was the daughter of Marina von Neumann Whitman, a noted economist and business executive, and Robert Freeman Whitman, professor emeritus of English at the University of Pittsburgh, and the granddaughter of mathematician and polymath John von Neumann. Laura Whitman's brother is Malcolm Whitman, Professor of Developmental Biology at Harvard University. David Downie has a brother, Scott Downie; a half-brother, Joshua Downie; and a half-sister, Sarah Downie. A step-brother, Carl Sims, Jr., died in 2024.

== Selected publications ==
Books

- Global Environmental Politics, 9th Edition, with Dr. Pamela Chasek and Dr. Jennifer Allen. Routledge, forthcoming, 2025.
- Global Environmental Politics, 8th Edition, co-authored with Professor Pamela Chasek. Routledge, 2021.
- Global Environmental Politics, 7th Edition, with Pamela Chasek. Westview Press, 2016.
- Global Environmental Politics, 6th Edition, with Pamela Chasek. Westview Press, 2014.
- Global Environmental Politics, 5th Edition, with Pamela Chasek. Westview Press, 2010.
- Climate Change: A Reference Handbook, with Kate Brash and Catherine Vaughan, ABC-CLIO, 2009
- Global Environmental Politics, 4th Edition, with Pamela Chasek and Janet Welsh Brown. Westview Press, 2006. This book was translated into German and also published as Handbuch Globale Umweltpolitik (Parthas Verlag Gmb, 2006).
- The Global Environment: Institutions, Law and Policy, Regina Axelrod, David Downie and Norman Vig, eds., CQ Press, 2005.
- Northern Lights against POPs: Combating Toxic Threats in the Arctic, with Terry Fenge. McGill-Queens University Press, 2003.

Selected Scholarly articles and book chapters

- David Downie, “Gender Distribution of Leadership Positions in Global Environmental Politics.” Global Environmental Politics. 25(1): 1-10 (February 2025). DOI: 10.1162/glep_a_00769.
- Pamela Chasek and David Downie, “Environmental Politics.” In Lucrecia García Iommi and Richard W. Maass, The United States and International Law: Paradoxes of Support across Contemporary Issues. Ann Arbor: University of Michigan Press, 2022.
- David Downie. “Stratospheric Ozone Depletion: Elements of Success in Global Environmental Policy.” In Paul Harris, ed., Routledge Handbook of Global Environmental Politics, 2nd Edition. New York: Routledge, 2022.
- David Downie and Jennifer Bernstein. “Case Studies in the Environment: An Analysis of Author, Editor, and Case Characteristics.” Case Studies in the Environment. January 2019. DOI: Case Studies in the Environment: an Analysis of Author, Editor, and Case Characteristics.
- David Downie. “Global Environmental Regimes and the Success of the Global Ozone Policy.” In Regina Axelrod and Stacy VanDeveer, eds., The Global Environment, 5th Edition. Washington: CQ Press, 2019.
- Jennifer Allen, David Downie, Jessica Templeton. "Experimenting with TripleCOPs: Productive Innovation or Counter-productive Complexity?" International Environmental Agreements: Politics, Law and Economics. 2018. DOI: 10.1007/s10784-018-9404-2
- David Downie, Austin Chinal, Ryan Fritz, Natalie Intemann, and Kayla Urbanowski, "The First Six Years of JESS: Categorizing Authors and Topics." Journal of Environmental Studies and Sciences. 2017. DOI: 10.1007/s13412-017-0448-3.
- Alexandra Erhardt, Carlos Rezende, Brian Walker, Dina Franceschi and David Downie. “Mercury Concentrations and Awareness in Campos dos Goytacazes, Brazil: Baseline Measures for Evaluating the Minamata Convention.” Journal of Environmental Studies and Sciences, 5(4)(December 2015):517-525.
- “Still No Time for Complacency: Evaluating the Ongoing Success and Continued Challenge of Global Ozone Policy.” Journal of Environmental Studies and Sciences, 5(2): 187-194 (June 2015). Journal of Environmental Studies and Sciences, Volume 5, Issue 2 - Springer
- “Vienna Convention and Montreal Protocol.” In Jean Morin Frédéric and Amandine Orsini, eds., Essential concepts for Global Environmental Governance. London: Routledge/Earthscan, 2014.
- “International Environmental Regimes and the Success of Global Ozone Policy.” In Regina Axelrod and Stacy VanDeveer, eds., The Global Environment, 4th Edition. Washington: CQ Press, 2014.
- “Stratospheric Ozone Depletion.” In Paul Harris, ed., Routledge Handbook of Global Environmental Politics. New York: Routledge, 2013.Routledge Handbook of Global Environmental Politics
- “Pesticides and Persistent Organic Pollutants,” with Jessica Templeton. In Paul Harris, ed., Routledge Handbook of Global Environmental Politics. New York: Routledge, 2013.
- "The Vienna Convention, Montreal Protocol and Global Policy to Protect Stratospheric Ozone.” In Philip Wexler et al., eds., Chemicals, Environment, Health: A Global Management Perspective. Taylor & Francis, 2012.
- “Global Environmental Regimes.” In Regina Axelrod, Stacy D. VanDeveer., The Global Environment, 3rd Edition. CQ Press, 2011.
- "Preventive Planetary Care", with Lyndon Valicentim and Gavin Schmidt, in Gavin Schmidt and Joshua Wolfe, eds., Climate Change: Picturing the Science. W.W. Norton, 2009.
- “Global Environmental Policy: Governance through Regimes.” In Regina Axelrod, David Downie and Norman Vig, eds., The Global Environment: Institutions, Law & Policy, 2nd Edition. Washington: CQ Press, 2005.
- “Global Policy for Toxic Chemicals.” with J. Krueger and H. Selin, in Regina Axelrod, David Downie and Norman Vig, eds., The Global Environment: Institutions, Law & Policy, 2nd Edition. Washington: CQ Press, 2005.
- “The United Nations Environment Programme at a Turning Point: Options for Change”, with Marc Levy in Pamela S. Chasek, ed., The United Nations and the Global Environment in the 21st Century: From Common Challenges to Shared Responsibilities. United Nations University Press, 2000.
- "The Power to Destroy: Understanding Stratospheric Ozone Politics as a Common Pool Resource Problem", in J. Samuel Barkin and George Shambaugh, eds., Anarchy and the Environment: The International Relations of Common Pool Resources. State University of New York Press, 1999.
- "Road Map or False Trail: Evaluating the Precedence of the Ozone Regime as Model and Strategy for Global Climate Change." International Environmental Affairs, 7(4):321-345 (Fall 1995).
- "UNEP and the Montreal Protocol: New Roles for International Organizations in Regime Creation and Change", in Robert V. Bartlett, Priya A. Kurian and Madhu Malik, eds., International Organizations and Environmental Policy. Greenwood Press, 1995.
