= North South Atlantic Training Transect =

The North South Atlantic Training Transect (NoSoAT) is a program developed by the Alfred Wegener Institute (AWI), the Strategic Marine Alliance for Research and Training (SMART), and the Partnership for Observation of the Global Oceans (POGO) to further the education and practical training of postgraduate students in climate and marine sciences. Each year, about 30 students are selected through a rigorous application process to join a voyage from Bremerhaven, Germany to Cape Town, South Africa aboard the RV Polarstern. The month-long course provides students with relevant lectures and projects, including hands-on training with atmospheric and oceanographic equipment, and instruction on data processing and analysis.

== Results from Previous Cruises ==
Each cruise has a unique focus that varies from year to year as topics become more or less important. While the 2015 cruise had a strong focus on biological oceanography, the 2016 cruise was more focused on physical and chemical oceanography. These different approaches to studying marine and climate sciences allow groups of post-doctorate students to be specifically trained in their respective fields.

=== NoSoAT 2015 - Expeditions PS95.1 and PS95.2 ===
The cruise track covered a broad range of habitats for various organisms and a broad range of characteristically different waters. Data collected came from equipment that included a Conductivity, Temperature, and Depth (CTD) Sonde; a Bongonet; a Ferrybox; and a Continuous Plankton Recorder (CPR). Samples of phytoplankton and zooplankton were obtained and analyzed in conjunction with satellite data. Preliminary results included the identification of three distinct water masses along the transect; discrepancies in the comparison of ship-board chlorophyll a measurements with satellite-derived chlorophyll a data; latitudinal variations in the depth of the chlorophyll a maximum; and variations in the impact of microzooplankton grazing on phytoplankton communities.
