= International Mechanism of Scientific Expertise on Biodiversity =

The consultative process towards an IMoSEB (International Mechanism of Scientific Expertise on Biodiversity) was a multidisciplinary effort from 2005 to 2008 that involved a large number of stakeholders and had a considerable political and media audience. Its aim was the creation of a value-added process by taking into account existing and current initiatives and mechanisms.

Initiated at the International Conference "Biodiversity: Science and Governance" in January 2005, it ended in November 2007 with the final meeting of its International Steering Committee (ISC). IMoSEB results were merged with the Millennium Ecosystem Assessment follow up to create the Intergovernmental Science-Policy platform on Biodiversity and Ecosystem Services (IPBES), led by UNEP. IPBES first meeting took place in November 2008 in Putrajaya, Malaysia.

== Background ==
=== International Conference "Biodiversity: Science and Governance" ===
During the International Conference held in January 2005, President Jacques Chirac launched a call for action to set up an IPCC like for biodiversity. The final declaration of the conference recommended in response, the launch of an international multi-stakeholder consultative process guided by a balanced multi-stakeholder steering committee. This process would assess the need for an international mechanism which would:

- Provide a critical assessment of the scientific information and policy options required decision-making;
- Build on existing bodies, current and recent activities

A provisional steering committee, based on the scientific and organizational committee of the conference, was set up to define the IMoSEB steering committee and its modalities of work .

=== Open Science Conference DIVERSITAS ===
During the DIVERSITAS conference held in Oaxaca, in October 2005, the scientific community reiterated its support to the consultative process and for the establishment of a scientific panel on biodiversity that included an intergovernmental component

=== CBD SBSTTA 11 ===
A first presentation of the consultative process, its modalities of work, its goals and possible outcomes, were presented during the 11th meeting of the Convention on Biological Diversity (CBD) SBSTTA in December 2006

== Consultative process towards an IMoSEB ==
=== International Steering Committee, Executive Committee, Executive Secretariat ===
The International Steering Committee (ISC) was composed of about 90 members:

1. Scientists from various disciplines (natural, social, applied and environmental sciences) and countries: Gaston Achoudong, Carlo Heip, Leonard Hirsch, Yvon Le Maho, Michel Loreau, Keping Ma, Georgina Mace, Alfred Oteng-Yeboah, Charles Perrings, Peter Raven, José Sarukhán, Robert Scholes, Arkady Tishkov, Jacques Weber;
2. Representatives of governments: Algeria, Austria, Canada, China, Costa-Rica, Denmark, France, Gabon, Germany, India, Iran, Italy, Jamaica, Madagascar, Malawi, Malaysia, Morocco, Namibia, New Zealand, Papua-New Guinea, Poland, Saudi Arabia, Senegal, Slovenia, South Korea, Spain, Sweden, Switzerland, Thailand, UK, United States;
3. Inter-Governmental or international Organizations, United Nations and Specialized Agencies, Non-governmental organizations, Research initiatives and others: CITES, CMS, Conservation International, Diversitas, EPBRS, European Commission, EEA, FAO, GBIF, Greenpeace (as observer), ICES – CIEM, ICSU, Institut Français de la Biodiversité, International Indigenous Forum on Biodiversity, IPGRI, IUCN, Millennium Ecosystem Assessment, Ramsar Convention, RAIPON, Swedish Scientific Council on Biological Diversity, Swiss Biodiversity Forum, The Nature Conservancy, UN CBD, UN CBD - SBSTTA, UNCCD, UNEP - DEWA, UNEP - WCMC, UNESCO, United Nations University - IAS, World Bank, WWF.

An Executive Committee (EC) was appointed to draft a plan of action for the consultation phase. The Executive Committee is co-chaired by Alfred Oteng-Yeboah and Michel Loreau and the following people became members of the EC: Ivar Baste, Martha Chouchena-Rojas, Christine Dawson, Horst Korn, Keping Ma, Georgina Mace, Martha Mapangou, Charles Perrings, Peter Raven, José Sarukhán, Robert Watson, Jacques Weber.

The Executive Secretariat was composed of the Executive Secretary, Didier Babin (Institut Français de la Biodiversité) and Maxime Thibon (Institut Français de la Biodiversité). The Executive Secretariat (ES) was responsible for coordination and promotion of the consultative process. Anne Larigauderie (DIVERSITAS) contributed to the work of this secretariat.

=== First ISC meeting and its conclusions ===
The consultative process was officially launched in February 2006 at its first meeting in Paris at the French National Museum of Natural History. More than 90 participants attended the meeting. The meeting overall ended with the agreement to

- Undertake a review of what is needed in the biodiversity science-policy interface, based on a study of existing mechanisms;
- Hold a consultation that would foster an open dialogue and explore different several possible options

The Executive Committee was asked to consider these two tasks and developed a plan of action for the consultation

A first step, based on case studies, aiming at:

- Map out the decision-making landscape affecting biodiversity;
- Analyze, using case studies, successes and failures to preserve biodiversity at different scales;
- Analyze existing models delivering scientific expertise

Based on the results of the studies, the Executive Committee identified a series of needs and formulated a number of possible options, as basis for discussion during regional consultations, seeking feedback on these propositions.

=== Case Studies ===
Several case studies on the science-policy interface on biodiversity and on How scientific is used in decision making processes have been conducted in 2006.

- Use of basic scientific information and its application to policies for the conservation and management of biodiversity in Mexico
- Lessons from Invasive Alien Species Management in a Marine Environment
- Fisheries and expertise
- The Role and Contribution of Biodiversity Science Expertise to Understanding and Illuminating Decision-Making on the Emergence and Spread of H5N1 Avian Influenza
- Mobilizing Traditional Knowledge and Expertise for Decision-Making on Biodiversity
- Science- Policy Interface: The Role of Scientific Assessments

=== Needs&Options ===
The following needs had been identified by the Executive Committee on the basis of the results of the case studies and from voluntary contributions about the effectiveness with which scientific and other relevant knowledge is used in decisions that affect biodiversity, ecosystem services and human well-being at the international scale.

1. To bring insights from the relevant sciences and other forms of knowledge to bear on local/national decisions that affect biodiversity where those decisions have international consequences, and where existing decision-processes appear to be relatively ill-informed by science and other forms of relevant knowledge (e.g. on transmission of invasive pests and pathogens, and exploitation of common pool resources in areas beyond national jurisdiction).
2. To provide independent scientific information from all relevant sources to support the work of international conventions and institutions, with particular emphasis on the CBD.
3. To enhance the capacity to predict the consequences of current actions affecting biodiversity, drawing on the sciences of both natural and social systems.
4. To provide, proactively, scientific advice on emerging threats and issues associated with biodiversity change identified either by science, and to be responsive to concerns about potential threats expressed by stakeholders.
5. To communicate scientific results on biodiversity to wider relevant audiences.
6. To provide scientific support to existing biodiversity and related monitoring and assessment exercises, and potentially to supplement these as necessary.
7. To reduce the time lag between the publication of scientific results on biodiversity and their incorporation in decision-processes.
8. To inform science and science funding agencies about biodiversity research priorities implied by decision-makers' concerns.

Options formulated by the EC as basis for discussion

1. To form a partnership with existing mechanisms for delivering science to national and international decision-making bodies. This option would have three main functions
2. To create a new mechanism, modeled loosely on the IPCC, but with both intergovernmental and nongovernmental components
3. To invite the IPCC to consider developing a biodiversity aspect to their activity
4. Using and strengthening existing networks of independent scientists to feed science, standards and principles (from existing academies and councils) into different fora through a small coordination mechanism

=== Regional consultations ===
In 2007, a set of regional consultations were organized, involving more than 300 participants and 40 international/regional organizations from 70 countries.

These consultations took place in:

- Montreal for North America
- Yaoundé for Africa
- Geneva for Europe
- Beijing for Asia
- Bariloche for South America
- Alotau for Pacific

=== Final International Steering Committee ===
The Final ISC took place in Montpellier in November 2007, and defined what could be and do a possible IMoSEB

The main features of an IMoSEB would be:

- supported by networks of scientists and knowledge holders
- with the capacity to conduct assessments
- and able to answer quickly in case of ecological crisis

The mechanism would be:

- independent,
- involving mainly researchers, nominated by governments, and proposed by the scientific community
- with involvement of international organizations and conventions
- hosted by UNEP

2008 agenda included:

1. An intergovernmental meeting to define better this mechanism and its funding (held in Nov 2008 in Putrajaya, Malaysia),
2. Presentation at CBD COP 9 in Bonn, in May 2008

=== Final document of the consultative process ===
1. A final report including all the IMoSEB outputs, available here
2. A poster presenting the process, available here

== Notes and references ==
- Loreau, Michel; Oteng-Yeboah, Alfred; Arroyo, M. T. K.; Babin, D.; Barbault, R.; Donoghue, M.; Gadgil, M.; Häuser, C.; Heip, C.; Larigauderie, A.; Ma, K.; Mace, G.; Mooney, H. A.; Perrings, C.; Raven, P.; Sarukhan, J.; Schei, P.; Scholes, R. J.; Watson, R. T. (2006). "Biodiversity without representation". Nature. 442 (7100): 245–246. Bibcode:2006Natur.442..245L. doi:10.1038/442245a. PMID 16855567. S2CID 4418694.
- "INTERNATIONAL MECHANISM OF SCIENTIFIC EXPERTISE ON BIODIVERSITY (IMoSEB)". IISD reporting services. Archived from the original on 2008-12-29.

== See also ==
- Millennium Ecosystem Assessment
