= Global Land Project =

The Global Land Project [changed to Global Land Programme in 2016] is a research initiative of Future Earth (originally the International Geosphere-Biosphere Programme (IGBP) and the International Human Dimensions Programme (IHDP)). It aims to understand the changes of the land systems given the prospects of rapid and massive global environmental change. The goal of GLP is "to measure, model and understand the coupled human-environment system".

The Global Land Project Science Plan describes the scientific questions that the land systems research community considers to be crucial for the next decade. GLP has three objectives that determine the research framework:

- To identify the agents, structures and nature of change in coupled human-environment systems on land, and to quantify their effects on the coupled system;
- To assess how the provision of ecosystem services is affected by the changes in (i) above; and
- To identify the character and dynamics of vulnerable and sustainable coupled human-environment systems to interacting perturbations, including climate change.
