= The Ocean Frontier Institute =

Canada headquartered ocean research center

Ocean Frontier Institute
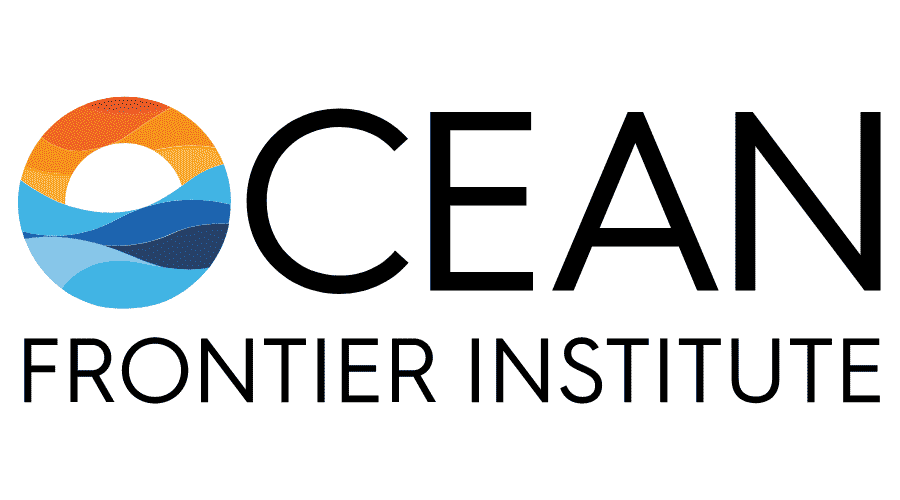
- Abbreviation: OFI
- Formation: September 1, 2016; 10 years ago
- Founders: Dalhousie University, Memorial University of Newfoundland, and University of Prince Edward Island
- Type: A non-profit research and higher education organization dedicated to ocean-based research and data.
- Purpose: Oceanography, Traditional knowledge, Oceanic climate, Climate change.
- Headquarters: Halifax Canada
- Location: Steele Ocean Sciences Building, Dalhousie University, 1355 Oxford St., Halifax, NS, Canada, B3H 4R2
- Region served: North Atlantic, Worldwide
- Official language: English
- Chief Executive Officer: Dr. Anya Waite
- Staff: 50-100
- Website: www.ofi.ca

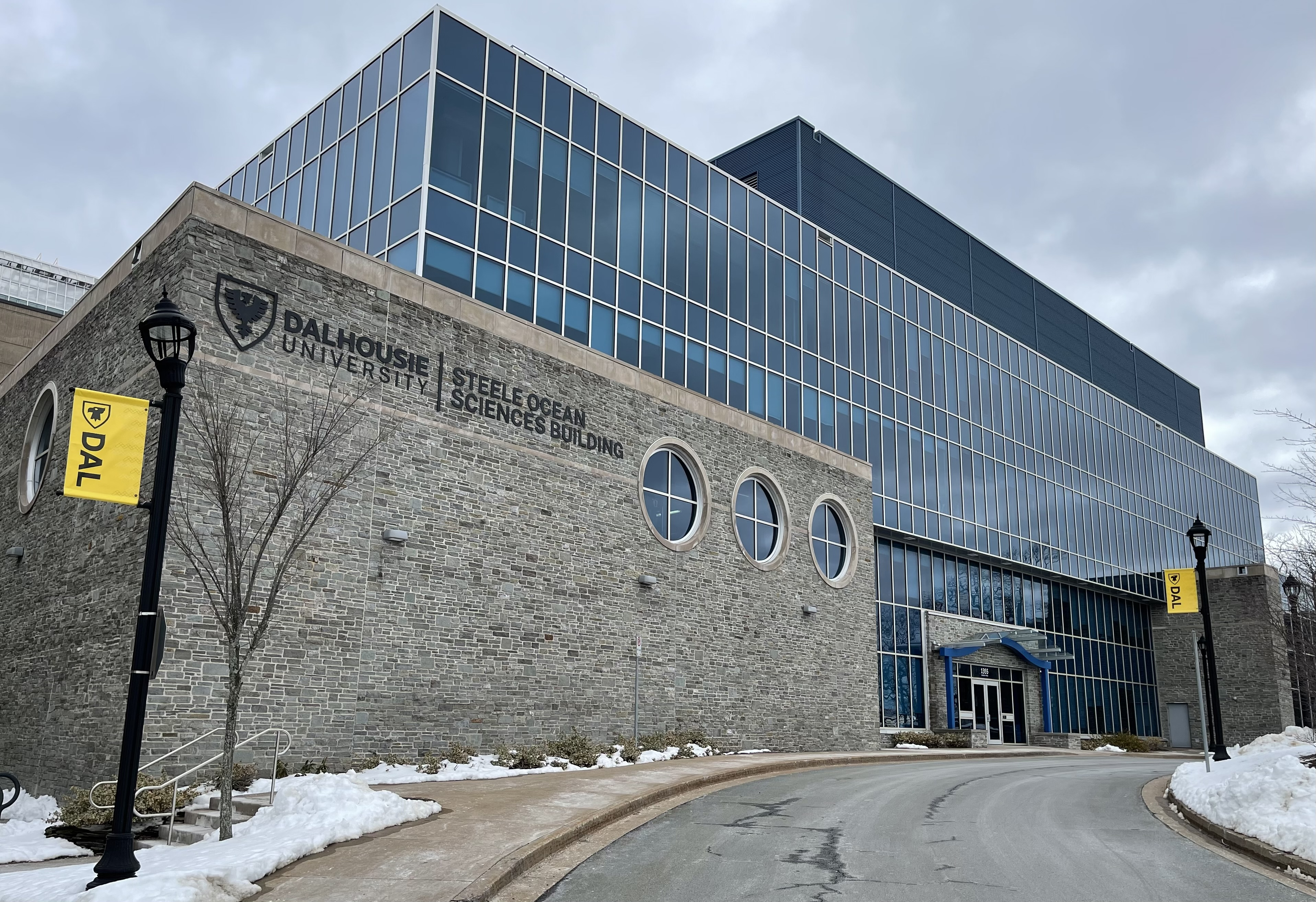
OFI Offices in Halifax, Nova Scotia, Canada

The Ocean Frontier Institute (OFI) is a non-profit research and higher education organization dedicated to ocean-based research and data. Established in 2016, the institute focuses its research on achieving net zero, protecting ocean biodiversity and sustaining ocean bioresources. OFI is based at Dalhousie University in the Ocean Sciences Building in Halifax, Nova Scotia, Canada.

== History ==
OFI was established in 2016 by Dalhousie University with partnerships in Memorial University of Newfoundland, and University of Prince Edward Island.

The Institution also partners with international ocean research institutes, other Canadian universities, governments, Indigenous communities, and industry ranging from local small businesses to international corporations.

In announcing the creation of OFI, Dalhousie University noted that it was set to become “one of the world’s most significant international ocean science collaborations.”

The initial funding for the organization included a $93.7 million commitment from the Canadian government through the Canada First Research Excellence Fund (CFREF). At the time of the announcement, it was the largest research grant in the history of Dalhousie University.

An additional $125 million in cash and in kind contributions was also provided by provincial governments and partners, most notably a $25 million gift from business leader and philanthropist John Risley.

The Institute administers the Canada First Research Excellence Fund, The Safe and Sustainable Development of the Ocean Frontier; Ocean School; and the North Atlantic Carbon Observatory (NACO); and hosts the Canadian project office of the Integrated Marine Biosphere Research (IMBeR) program.

OFI's first CEO was Wendy Watson-Wright, who served in the role until December 2019. During this period, OFI saw more than sixteen ocean focused research projects reviewed by internal and external experts which included scientific analysis of the changing ocean ecosystems as well as studies to strengthen marine safety, ocean data and technology and the fishing and aquaculture industries. A further six large-scale research projects were launched in 2020 focused on the North Atlantic Ocean Climate and Coastal Communities and the Ocean.

In March 2018 OFI launched its first round of Seed Funding in partnership with Canada's Ocean Supercluster and Innovacorp, providing financial support to ideas with the potential for advancing research, commercial or social concepts relating to the ocean. The Seed Fund has supported over 100 ocean related research projects ranging from studies on Non-Toxic Marine Anti-fouling Paint, to 4D Ocean Sensing Strategy, to collaboration efforts on the blending of Indigenous and Western knowledge.

In 2018 OFI and Dalhousie University also invested over 2 million dollars for the creation of DeepSense, a partnership between industry, academia and government focused on using ocean related data and artificial intelligence to better support commercial enterprises.

In January 2020, the CEO position was taken up by Dr. Anya Waite who had previously served as the organizations Scientific Director.

Throughout 2021 and 2022, OFI dramatically expanded its engagement with public and research groups with a series of webinars to inform ocean and coastal governance and introduce social sciences and humanities-led research and with the introduction of an annual Carbon Workshop to discuss the ocean's changing ability to absorb carbon, in particular the importance of ‘Deep Blue Carbon.’

== Training and Education ==
The Ocean Graduate Excellence Network (OGEN) was launched by OFI in 2021, with current funding partners including the National Research Council of Canada, Mitacs, Graphite Innovation Technologies, and Fisheries and Oceans Canada. The program provides individualized training and research opportunities to graduate students.

OFI's International Postdoctoral Fellowships offer opportunities for early-career PhDs to conduct collaborative research at Dalhousie University, with travel to one of OFI's partner institutions in Europe or the United States. OFI has supported fellowships with international partners such as WHOI, GEOMAR, AWI, and ISBlue.

OFI's Visiting Fellowships program helps to develop ocean leaders by providing opportunities for early-career PhDs to conduct research at one of OFI's Canadian institutions or at one of OFI's eight international academic partner institutions.

In spring of 2022 OFI sponsored undergraduate students from Dalhousie University in Halifax and Memorial University of Newfoundland on a 16-week expedition aboard the research sailing vessel Statsraad Lehmkuhl. The students participated as crew members as they sailed the Pacific Ocean, following an ocean sustainability course offered through Norway's University of Bergen.

== Conferences ==
OFI hosts a broad open conference on a biennial basis, gathering experts, researchers, and leaders from around the world to discuss and debate topical issues in ocean research.

- 2018: First OFI Conference: The first OFI conference was held in St. John's Newfoundland and attended by over 330 delegates from across the globe. The conference covered areas such as: How Science, Partnerships and Innovation Will Secure a Future for the Ocean; Our Changing Ocean; Identifying Ocean Solutions; and Industry Perspectives on the Importance of Ocean Research.
- 2022: Second OFI Conference: The second OFI Conference took place in Halifax, Nova Scotia with more than 200 delegates engaged in four main themes: Achieving Net Zero and Ocean Carbon, People and the Ocean, Imperative of Ocean Based Carbon Dioxide Removal (CDR), Food from the Ocean, and Innovation and Commercialisation.

OFI and United Nations Conference of the Parties (COP)

Beginning with COP26, OFI has been an active participant in the UN COP meetings, bringing attention to the role the ocean plays in sustainable development efforts and advocating for the importance of integrated ocean carbon observations.

- COP26 – At the 26th Conference of the Parties to the UNFCCC in 2021, an OFI delegation advocated for including ocean chemistry variables in the climate targets planned to be set at the Conference.
- COP27 – At the 27th COP Meeting in 2022, OFI saw its role expand as CEO Dr. Waite spoke at or moderated 10 events including: An event on Ocean Observations for Climate Change in partnership with Observation of the Global Ocean (POGO) and GOOS; A National Oceanography Centre event on Blue Carbon; The ocean's role in fighting climate change; and An Egyptian Space Agency event on The interplay of machine learning and earth sciences in assessing coral reefs and other marine habitats.

== Indigenous Engagement ==
Like many Canadian institutions, OFI incorporates Local Traditional Knowledge, Place Based Knowledge and Traditional Ecological Knowledge as a central part of its research efforts. In collaboration with Indigenous ( Métis and First Nations) groups and the OFI research community, the Indigenous Engagement Guide, an evolving document, assists the OFI community in identifying how research programs may impact Indigenous groups and provides guidance on respectful engagement and developing meaningful research relationships with Indigenous governments, communities, and organisations. Research Programs funded through OFI are required to meet the expectations set out in the Guide.
