= Programme on Ecosystem Change and Society =

Programme on Ecosystem Change and Society (PECS) is a core project of Future Earth. PECS is an international research network that aims to connect and integrate research on the stewardship of social–ecological systems, how these systems support human wellbeing.

PECS was established in 2011. It is hosted by Stellenbosch University, from 2011-2019 it was hosted by the Stockholm Resilience Centre at Stockholm University. Since the beginning of 2014 PECS has been part of Future Earth, the global sustainability research platform. A number of research projects have been affiliated with PECS, and it has created a number of regional nodes and thematic projects to integrate social-ecological research. For example, one large active regional group is SAPECS, which brings together social-ecological researchers in South Africa. It has also organised and hosted three open science conferences, the first in 2015 in South Africa, the second in 2017 in Mexico, and the third in 2024 in Canada.
