= Diversitas =

International biodiversity research programme (1991–2014)

- Formation: 1991
- Founder: International Council for Science (ICSU), International Union of Biological Sciences (IUBS), Scientific Committee on Problems of the Environment (SCOPE)
- Dissolved: 2014
- Type: International scientific programme
- Legal status: Defunct
- Headquarters: Paris, France
- Region served: Global
- Official language: English, French
- Parent organization: Future Earth
- Affiliations: United Nations Environment Programme

DIVERSITAS (the Latin word for “diversity”) was an international research programme aiming at integrating biodiversity science for human well-being. In December 2014 its work was transferred to the programme called Future Earth, which was sponsored by the Science and Technology Alliance for Global Sustainability, comprising the International Council for Science (ICSU), the International Social Science Council (ISSC), the Belmont Forum of funding agencies, the United Nations Educational, Scientific, and Cultural Organization (UNESCO), the United Nations Environment Programme (UNEP), the United Nations University (UNU) and the World Meteorological Organization (WMO). Anne Larigauderie served as its Executive Director between 2002 and 2012.

== Diversitas mission ==
Biodiversity underpins the life-support system of our planet. Both natural and managed ecosystems deliver important ecological services such as the production of food and fibre, carbon storage, climate regulation and recreation opportunities. The program was established to address the complex scientific questions posed by the loss in biodiversity and ecosystem services and to offer science-based solutions to this crisis.

The program is an international programme of biodiversity science with a dual mission:

- Promoting, facilitating and conducting integrative biodiversity science, that links biological, ecological and social disciplines; and
- Providing the sound scientific basis for decision making to secure the planet’s variety of life, while contributing to human well-being and poverty eradication.

The program achieves its mission by:

- Fostering an integrated network of the world’s leading biodiversity scientists to address critical biodiversity issues;
- Producing new knowledge by catalysing exchanges between scientists across nations and disciplines;
- Synthesising new biodiversity knowledge to address the global science priorities;
- Ensuring an effective engagement of the biodiversity science community globally with policy and decision makers, especially with relevant international conventions;
- Developing biodiversity science capacity by nurturing younger scientists around the world.

The international Secretariat is based in Paris, France (hosted by the French National Museum of Natural History - Muséum National d'Histoire Naturelle (MNHN)), while the different core projects are based all around the world.

== Diversitas history ==
=== Phase 1 (1991-2001): Biodiversity gains attention on the global scale ===
The program was established in 1991 by three international organizations: the United Nations Educational, Scientific and Cultural Organization (UNESCO), the Scientific Committee on Problems of the Environment (SCOPE) and the International Union of Biological Science (IUBS), at the time the need to address the complex scientific questions posed by the loss of and change in global biodiversity was identified. The goal of the initiative was to develop an international, non-governmental umbrella program for research projects.

In 1996, the program welcomed two new sponsors, the International Council for Science (ICSU) and the International Union of Microbiological Societies (IUMS).

The key findings during its first decade were synthesised in a series of books and laid the groundwork for experimental and theoretical research carried out by the program and the International Geosphere-Biosphere Programme (IGBP). These findings also contributed to the Global Biodiversity Assessment, an initiative of the World Resources Institute (WRI), and to the work of the Convention on Biological Diversity (CBD), established in 1992, and with which Diversitas has a Memorandum of Understanding.

=== Phase 2 (2002-2011): An international framework for biodiversity science ===
In 2001, the program organised an international consultation of its stakeholders on the need to launch a second phase of the programme. The conclusions of this consultation were in favour of launching a second phase, which would be more integrative and inter-disciplinary, and more policy relevant.

The new science Plan was published in 2002. To implement this science plan, nine projects were established embracing a cycle of discovery, observation, analysis, and information sharing, on overarching scientific questions on biodiversity and related ecosystem services:

- Global Invasive Species Programme (GISP) – a project aiming at preventing and managing invasive species
- Global Mountain Biodiversity Assessment (GMBA) – a project aiming at exploring and understanding mountain biodiversity
- bioGENESIS – a project aiming at providing an evolutionary framework for biodiversity science
- bioDISCOVERY – a project aiming at assessing, monitoring, and predicting biodiversity change
- ecoSERVICES – a project aiming at exploring the links between biodiversity, ecosystem functioning and services
- bioSUSTAINABILITY – a project aiming at building adaptive governance and management of ecosystem services
- agroBIODIVERSITY – a project aiming at developing a new science agenda for biodiversity in support of sustainable agro-ecosystems
- ecoHEALTH – a project aiming at exploring links between biodiversity and emerging infectious diseases
- freshwaterBIODIVERSITY – a project aiming at developing a new science agenda for biodiversity in support of sustainable freshwater ecosystems

In addition to these scientific projects, the program has been strongly engaged in the Earth System Science Partnership (ESSP), a partnership for the integrated study of the Earth System, the ways that it is changing, and the implications for global and regional sustainability. During this second phase, the program continued its engagement in serving policy fora, and the Convention on Biological Diversity (CBD), in particular. The program organized its first Open Science Conference in Oaxaca, Mexico, in October 2005, where the scientific community reiterated its support for the establishment of a scientific panel on biodiversity that included an intergovernmental component (cf. International Mechanism of Scientific Expertise on Biodiversity (IMoSEB )) and its second Open Science Conference in Cape Town, South Africa, in October 2009; the Cape Town conference attracted an international audience of 700 scientists and policy makers from about 70 countries representing many facets of biodiversity science and policy.

=== Phase 3 (2012-2020): Biodiversity and ecosystem services science for a sustainable planet ===
Since mid-2009, and in the light of the changes in the biodiversity science-policy landscape, the program has been engaged in a phase of reviewing its activities and revising its 2002 Science Plan. The new Science Plan was published in 2012. During this on-going phase, the program has been or is being strongly involved in:

- the establishment of a global observing system for biodiversity, called GEO BON - Group on Earth Observations - Biodiversity Observation Network. GEO BON represents the biodiversity component of the Global Earth Observation System of Systems (GEOSS) under the auspices of the Group on Earth Observations (GEO),
- the consultation on an Intergovernmental Science-Policy Platform on Biodiversity and Ecosystem Services (IPBES) which was launched in April 2012,
- the launch of the new scientific initiative Future Earth: research towards sustainability, which was launched at Rio+20,
- the Planet Under Pressure conference in 2012, and
- the Rio+20 conference in 2012.
