= GEOHAB =

International harmful algal bloom research programme

- Objective: Harmful algal blooms
- Duration: 1998 – present
- Website: http://geohab.org/

GEOHAB is an international research programme on the Global Ecology and Oceanography of Harmful algal blooms.

It was initiated in 1998 by the Scientific Committee on Oceanic Research (of ICSU) and the Intergovernmental Oceanographic Commission of UNESCO.
