= Earth Negotiations Bulletin =

Daily coverage on global environmental and sustainable-development negotiations

- A Reporting Service for Environment and Development Negotiations
- Type: Conference papers and proceedings
- Format: Printed, Website, Email, Facebook, Twitter
- Owner: International Institute for Sustainable Development
- Founder(s): Johannah Bernstein, Pamela Chasek, Langston James "Kimo" Goree VI
- Editor: Pamela Chasek
- Launched: March 1992
- Political alignment: Neutral
- Language: English, French
- City: New York City
- OCLC number: 55977959
- Website: https://enb.iisd.org/
- Free online archives: Yes

The Earth Negotiations Bulletin (ENB) is a reporting service providing daily coverage on a variety of global environmental and sustainable development negotiations.

The team of environmental negotiations specialists document efforts by the United Nations, national governments, civil society organizations, and other actors to respond to pressing global challenges, such as climate change, biodiversity loss, land management, over pollution, widening inequality, chemicals and wastes management, trade in endangered species, deep sea mining, and ocean management.

ENB publishes daily reports and summaries in print and online, distributing news through web, email, and social media feeds. Their outputs are also distributed at meeting venues during conferences of the parties to multilateral environmental agreements.

ENB is a division of the International Institute for Sustainable Development.

== History ==
The Earth Negotiations Bulletin (originally titled the Earth Summit Bulletin) began as the joint initiative of three individuals from the NGO community, who were publishing a daily bulletin at the United Nations Conference on Environment and Development (UNCED) in 1992. Namely, Johannah Bernstein, an environmental lawyer and Director of the Canadian Participatory Committee for UNCED, Pamela Chasek, a doctoral student at Johns Hopkins University's Paul H. Nitze School of Advanced International Studies, and Langston James Goree VI "Kimo", a former UNDP programme officer and NGO activist from the Western Amazon.

The International Institute for Sustainable Development (IISD) approached the three founders with an offer to continue publishing the Earth Summit Bulletin at follow-up negotiations to the Earth Summit. In November 1992, the Earth Summit Bulletin was renamed the Earth Negotiations Bulletin. Since 1993, the Earth Negotiations Bulletin has covered over 30 negotiating processes within the United Nations system.

== Personnel ==
Many writers join the team while in graduate school and eventually move on to careers in international organizations. Conversely, retired career diplomats from the United States, Russia, and China have also brought their experience to the team.

== Coverage ==
The ENB covers a range of topics in sustainability. Core coverage areas include:

- Sustainable Development, including the Commission on Sustainable Development
- Climate and Atmosphere, including the UN Framework Convention on Climate Change, Intergovernmental Panel on Climate Change, and Montreal Protocol
- Biodiversity and Wildlife, including the Convention on Biological Diversity, Commission on Genetic Resources for Food and Agriculture, Convention on International Trade in Endangered Species, Convention on Migratory Species, and Intergovernmental Science-Policy Platform on Biodiversity and Ecosystem Services (formerly the International Mechanism of Scientific Expertise on Biodiversity)
- Forests, Deserts and Land, including the United Nations Forum on Forests, International Tropical Timber Organization Council, and FAO Committee on Forestry
- Chemicals Management, including the Basel Convention, Rotterdam Convention and Stockholm Convention
- Human Development, including UN-HABITAT
- Organizations, including the United Nations Environment Programme
- Trade and Investment, including the Global Environment Facility
- Water, Oceans and Wetlands, including the World Water Forum, Global Conference on Oceans, Coasts and Islands, the Informal Consultative Process on Oceans and the Law of the Sea, the Straddling Fish Stocks Agreement, the Working Group on Marine Biodiversity Beyond Areas of National Jurisdiction, and the Ramsar Convention on Wetlands.

Reporting teams are also sent to a variety of conferences on sustainability that fall outside the confines of the list above, under agreements with conference organizers. These conferences include regional negotiations, conferences dealing with sustainability in specific industries such as the International Hydropower Association World Congress on Sustainable Hydropower, and special-interest days within larger conferences, such as "Business Day" during UN Climate Change conferences.
