= Anya Waite =

Canadian biological oceanographer

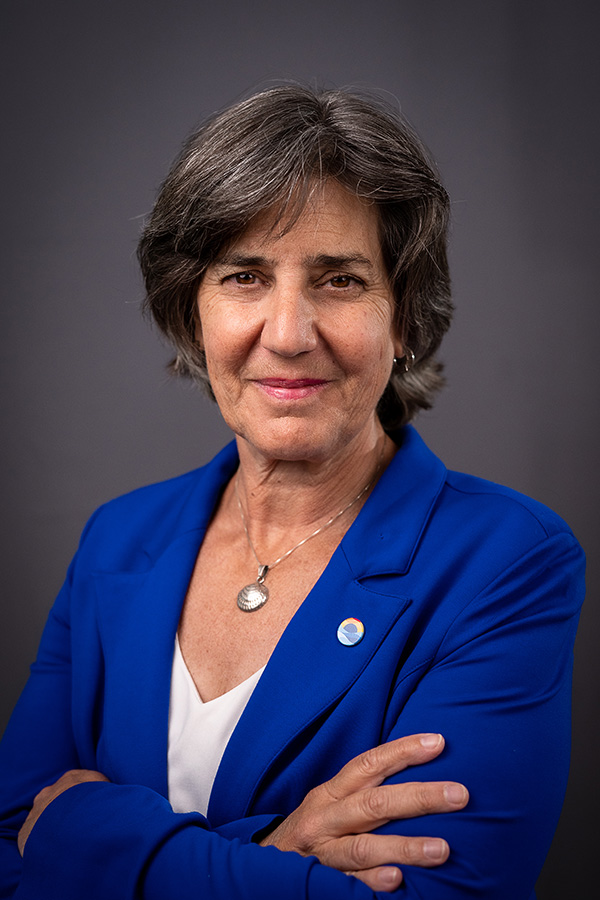
- Education: Dalhousie University; University of British Columbia
- Scientific career
- Fields: Ocean biogeochemistry, particle dynamics, marine food webs, biophysical coupling, mesoscale dynamics, submesoscale dynamics, carbon fluxes, nitrogen uptake, nitrogen fixation

Anya Waite is a Canadian biological oceanographer working at the Ocean Frontier Institute at Dalhousie University, where she is a professor in the Department of Oceanography.

== Career ==
Since 2020, Waite has been the Chief Executive Officer and Scientific Director of the Ocean Frontier Institute. In this role, she contributed to the development of research and training programs such as the Safe and Sustainable Development of the Ocean Frontier initiative and the Transforming Climate Action program.

She was previously Winthrop Professor at the University of Western Australia's Oceans Institute, the Section Head of Polar Biological Oceanography at the Alfred Wegener Institute in Bremerhaven, and a professor of oceanography in the biology department at the University of Bremen. Throughout her time at the University of Western Australia, she was awarded the PCB Professional Development Scholarship.

Waite was the first woman to co-chair the Global Ocean Observing System (GOOS), a position she held from 2021 to 2024.

Waite is also featured on a digital poster as part of the Ingenium - Canada's Museums of Science and Innovation Women in STEM initiative that aim to make equity-deserving groups in STEM more visible, to promote careers for equity-deserving groups in STEM, to highlight issues of inequality, and to celebrate achievements and advocates.

== Selected awards ==
In 2024, Waite received the prestigious Yoshida Award from the Oceanographic Society of Japan, which is given to exceptional contributors to ocean upwelling research. Also in 2024, she received the Frank McKenna Award for outstanding contributions to public policy by Atlantic Canadians.

In January 2025, Waite was awarded the King Charles III Coronation Medal for “exceptional contributions to Canada.” In April 2025, Waite was awarded the Chevalier de l’Ordre des Palmes Acaémiques for her work in ocean research, and “for embodying the very spirit of international cooperation: visionary, inclusive, and grounded in excellence.”

== Education ==
Waite earned a BSc in biology from Dalhousie and a PhD in biological oceanography from the University of British Columbia, followed by postdoctoral work at Woods Hole Oceanographic Institution and Victoria University in New Zealand.

== Selected publications ==
- Waite, AM; Thompson, PA; Pesant, S; Feng, M; Beckley, LE; Domingues, CM; Gaughan, D (2007). "The Leeuwin Current and its eddies: An introductory overview". Deep Sea Research Part II: Topical Studies in Oceanography. 54 (8–10): 789–96. Bibcode:2007DSRII..54..789W. doi:10.1016/j.dsr2.2006.12.008.
- Raven, JA; Waite, AM (2004). "The evolution of silicification in diatoms: Inescapable sinking and sinking as escape?". New Phytologist. 162 (1): 45–61. doi:10.1111/j.1469-8137.2004.01022.x.
- Waite, AM; Thompson, PA; Harrison, PJ (1992). "Does energy control the sinking rates of marine diatoms?". Limnology and Oceanography. 37 (3): 468–477. Bibcode:1992LimOc..37..468W. doi:10.4319/lo.1992.37.3.0468.
