= Pamela Chasek =

American political scientist

- Born: 1961 (age 64–65)

Academic background
- Education: Middlebury College, University of Miami
- Alma mater: Johns Hopkins University

Academic work
- Discipline: Political science
- Sub-discipline: International environmental policy
- Institutions: Manhattan College, School of International and Public Affairs, Columbia University
- Notable works: Global Environmental Politics

Pamela S. Chasek (born 1961) is a professor in the Department of Political Science at Manhattan University (formerly Manhattan College), and editor of the Earth Negotiations Bulletin. She was an adjunct professor at Columbia University's School of International and Public Affairs from 1996-2000. She is widely published on the topic of international environmental policy.

== Academic focus ==
Chasek focuses her research and lecturing on international environmental policy, multilateral diplomacy and negotiations and US foreign policy. Her regional interests include the Middle East, Africa and Latin America. Her co-authored book, Global Environmental Politics, 9th edition , written with Professor David L. Downie and Jen Iris Allan is one of the most widely used in the field.

== Education ==
Chasek received her BA degree from Middlebury College and her MA at the University of Miami. She received a second MA from Johns Hopkins University, where she also completed her Ph.D. in international studies at the Paul H. Nitze School of Advanced International Studies.

== Honors and awards ==
- 2007: Fulbright Senior Scholar Award, for research at Victoria University of Wellington, New Zealand
- 2009: National Women's History Month Honoree, National Women's History Project
- 2022: Distinguished Senior Scholar in Environmental Studies, presented by the Environmental Studies Section of the International Studies Association

== Professional memberships ==
Chasek is a member of the International Studies Association and the American Political Science Association. She is also the founder and editor of Earth Negotiations Bulletin, a reporting service on United Nations environment and development negotiations.

== Personal life ==
Chasek grew up in New Providence, New Jersey and currently lives in New York with her husband and co-creator of the Earth Negotiations Bulletin, Langston J. Goree VI (Kimo). She has two sons.

== Selected publications ==
- Chasek, Pamela S., David L. Downie and Jen Iris Allan. Global Environmental Politics, ninth edition. New York: Routledge, 2025.
- Chasek, Pamela S. and David L. Downie. Global Environmental Politics, eighth edition. New York: Routledge, 2021.
- Chasek, Pamela S., Macharia Kamau and David O'Connor. Transforming Multilateral Diplomacy: The Inside Story of the Sustainable Development Goals. New York: Routledge, 2018
- Chasek, Pamela S., David L. Downie and Janet Welsh Brown. Global Environmental Politics, seventh edition. Boulder: Westview Press, 2017.
- Chasek, Pamela S. and Lynn M. Wagner. The Road to Rio: Lessons Learned from Twenty Years of Multilateral Environmental Negotiations. New York: Routledge, 2012.
- Chasek, Pamela S. and Richard Sherman. Ten Days in Johannesburg: A Negotiation of Hope. Cape Town: Struik Publishers, 2004.
- Chasek, Pamela S. Earth Negotiations: Analyzing thirty years of environmental diplomacy. Tokyo: UNU Press, 2001.
- Chasek, Pamela S., ed. The Global Environment in the 21st Century: Prospects for International Cooperation. Tokyo: UNU Press, 2000.
- Chasek, Pamela S. “Sustainable Development in the 21st Century” in Michael Snarr and D. Neil Snarr, eds Introducing Global Issues, fourth edition. Boulder: Lynne Rienner, 2008.
- Chasek, Pamela S. “International Climate Change Politics: Looking Beyond 2012” in Jonathan Boston, ed. Towards a New Global Climate Treaty: Looking Beyond 2012. Wellington, New Zealand: Institute of Policy Studies, 2007.
- Chasek, Pamela S. “The Negotiating System of Environment and Development: A ten-year review” in Gunnar Sjöstedt, Elisabeth Corell and Angela Churie Kallhauge, eds. Global Challenges: Furthering the multilateral policy process, Sheffield, UK: Greenleaf Publishing, 2005.
- Chasek, Pamela S. “Environmental Organizations and Multilateral Diplomacy: A Case Study of the Earth Negotiations Bulletin” in James P. Muldoon, Jr., et al., eds. Multilateral Diplomacy and the United Nations Today, third edition. Boulder: Westview, 2005.
- Chasek, Pamela S. “The Ozone Depletion Regime,” in Bertram Specter and I. William Zartman, ed. Getting it Done: Post Agreement Negotiations and International Regimes. Washington, DC: United States Institute of Peace Press, 2003.
- Chasek, Pamela S. “Negotiations on the Convention to Combat Desertification,” in Gunnar Sjöstedt, ed. Professional Cultures in International Negotiation: Bridge or Rift? Lanham, MD: Lexington Books, 2003.
- Chasek, Pamela S. “Steps Toward Enhanced Parity: Negotiating Capacity and Strategies of Developing Countries,” in Inge Kaul, ed. Providing Global Public Goods: Making Globalization Work for All. New York: Oxford University Press, 2002 (with Lavanya Rajamani).
- Chasek, Pamela S. “Scientific Uncertainty in Environmental Negotiations” in Ho-Won Jeong, ed. Global Environmental Policies. London: Palgrave, 2001.
- Chasek, Pamela S. "The Story of the UNCED Process" and "The Negotiating System of Environment and Development." in Gunnar Sjöstedt, Bertram Spector and I. William Zartman, eds. Negotiating International Regimes: Lessons Learned from the United Nations Conference on Environment and Development. London: Graham and Trotman, 1994.
