= Global Roundtable on Climate Change =

The Global Roundtable on Climate Change, convened by the Earth Institute at Columbia University brought together representatives from corporations, research institutions, and government organizations to discuss the scientific consensus, economics, technology, and public policy issues associated with climate change. Following preliminary research and discussions, the group first met in 2005 and held a series of public and private meetings over the next five year.

The Roundtable had five objectives:

- Improve global consensus on the science, technology, economics, and policy issues of anthropogenic climate change.
- Review technology and policy proposals for mitigating climate change while meeting global energy demand.
- Support research and prototypes of technologies and policies that address climate change.
- Provide a forum for discussion, analysis, and exchange of ideas from the represented groups.
- Support proposals and initiatives generated by the Roundtable's discussions.

Participants in the Roundtable meetings: ABB, Air France, Alcan, Alcoa, Alliant Energy, Allianz, American Electric Power, BASF, Bayer, Calvert Group, China Renewable Energy Industry Association, Citigroup, Coalition of Rainforest Nations, Columbia University, Deutsche Telekom, DuPont, Electricity Generating Authority of Thailand, Endesa, Environmental Defense, Eskom, Eni, Exelon, Fairfield University, FPL Group, General Electric, Iberdrola, ING Group, Intergovernmental Panel on Climate Change, International Gas Union, Munich Re, National Grid, NRG Energy, Rainforest Alliance, Republic of Iceland, Ricoh, Suntech Power, Swiss Re, US Renewables Group, Vattenfall, Volvo, World Council on Churches, World Petroleum Council, and many others.

The Roundtable was funded by a grant from the Lenfest Foundation. Jeffrey Sachs, Director of the Earth Institute served as Chair. David L. Downie served as Director of the Global Roundtable on Climate Change before leaving the Earth Institute to join Fairfield University.

On February 20, 2007, the Roundtable released "The Path to Climate Sustainability: A Joint Statement by the Global Roundtable on Climate Change". The Joint Statement outlines a post-Kyoto framework and has been endorsed by over 100 of the Roundtable participating corporations and organizations. The Statement outlines ways to effect change at the levels of policy and industry, particularly in regards to creating sustainable energy systems necessary for achieving economic growth.

In addition to its internal discussions, which were aimed at information exchange, education and consensus building, and development of the parthbreaking Joint Statement, Roundtable participants also participated in public forums. For example, David L. Downie organized two side-event panels during sessions of the global climate negotiations that featured presentations by Roundtable Participants, including himself, regarding how businesses and scientists were working together to lower greenhouse gas emissions. David L. Downie also discussed the Roundtable and related issues at other events during the climate negotiations and in other forums

== See also ==
- Intergovernmental Panel on Climate Change
