= Anne Larigauderie =

French ecologist

- Born: Bourges, France
- Education: University of Paris
- Known for: Executive Secretary of IPBES (Intergovernmental Science-Policy Platform on Biodiversity and Ecosystem Services)
- Awards: Legion of Honour (Chevalier)
- Scientific career
- Fields: Biodiversity, Ecology
- Workplaces: IPBES (Executive Secretary), CNRS

Anne Larigauderie (born in Bourges, France) is a French ecologist and science-policy leader, known for her work on biodiversity and its role in sustainable development. She was the first Executive Secretary of the Intergovernmental Science-Policy Platform on Biodiversity and Ecosystem Services (IPBES), serving from 2014 to 2025, and had earlier contributed to its establishment. Before that she was Executive Director of DIVERSITAS, an international programme for biodiversity science, and head of Environment at the International Council for Science (ICSU).

== Education ==
Anne Larigauderie received her master's degree in plant molecular biology from the Université Paul Sabatier, Toulouse, France, and her PhD in plant ecology, from the Université des Sciences et Techniques du Languedoc and the French National Centre for Scientific Research (CNRS) in Montpellier, France. She then spent several years in the US, working as a research scientist in several scientific projects. In Alaska, for example, she was involved in the first pilot project performing CO_{2} enrichment of natural ecosystems in the tundra in open top chambers (with Walter C. Oechel) to understand and predict impact of climate change on plant physiology and ecology. In California (San Diego State University and the University of California – Davis) she worked on root competition among California grassland species for soil nutrient pockets (with Jim Richards). A subsequent project focused on responses of various grass species to various scenarios of elevated CO_{2} and temperature, the aim of which was to predict response of grasses to future climate change (with Boyd Strain and Jim Reynolds, Duke University, North Carolina).

== Career ==
Larigauderie then returned to Europe, working as a research scientist on the potential acclimation of dark respiration of lowland and alpine plant species to future elevated temperatures (with Christian Körner, University of Basel, Switzerland). In 1996 she became the coordinator of the Swiss Priority Programme on biodiversity, and the scientific adviser to the Swiss delegation to the Convention on Biological Diversity. In 1999, she joined the International Council for Science (ICSU, Paris), as Environmental Sciences Officer. She was appointed as executive director of DIVERSITAS late 2001. Her priorities have been to build DIVERSITAS as a strong international scientific programme dedicated, on one hand, to the sciences of biodiversity and ecosystem services, and, on the other hand, to strengthen the science-policy interface for biodiversity and ecosystem services. She has worked to facilitate, on behalf of the scientific community, the establishment of an IPCC-like mechanism for biodiversity, called IPBES, the Intergovernmental science-policy Platform on Biodiversity and Ecosystem services. In 2013, she became Head of Science in Society at ICSU, the International Council for Science.

In 2010, she was made Chevalier de l’Ordre national de la Légion d’Honneur by the French national Ministry of National Education, Advanced Instruction, and Research.

She currently resides in Paris.

== Publications ==
- Perrings C, Duraiappah A, Larigauderie A and Mooney HA. 2011. The Biodiversity and Ecosystem Services Science-Policy Interface, Science 331: 1139-1140
- Larigauderie A, Mace GM, Mooney HA. 2010. Colour-coded targets would help clarify biodiversity priorities. Nature. 464, 160
- A Larigauderie and H Mooney. Editors of a Special issue: May 2010. Current Opinion in Environmental Sustainability (COSUST) volume 2: Terrestrial systems.
- Larigauderie A, Mooney HA. 2010. The International Year of Biodiversity: an opportunity to strengthen the science–policy interface for biodiversity and ecosystem services (Editorial). Current Opinion in Environmental Sustainability (COSUST) volume 2 (1-2)
- Larigauderie A, Mooney HA. 2010. The Intergovernmental science-policy Platform on Biodiversity and Ecosystem Services: moving a step closer to an IPCC-like mechanism for biodiversity. Current Opinion in Environmental Sustainability (COSUST) volume 2(1): 9–14.
- Mace GM, Cramer W, Diaz S, Faith DP, Larigauderie A, Le Prestre P, Palmer M, Perrings C, Scholes RJ, Walpole M, Walther BA, Watson JEM, Mooney HA. 2010. Biodiversity targets after 2010. Current Opinion in Environmental Sustainability (COSUST) volume 2 (1): 3–8.
- Hendry AP, Lohmann LG, Cracraft J, Tillier S, Haeuser C, Faith DP, Magallon S, Conti E, Zardoya R, Kogure K, Larigauderie A, Prieur-Richard AH, Crandall KA, Joly CA, Mortiz C, Yahara T, and MJ Donoghue. 2009. Evolutionary Biology in biodiversity science and conservation: a call to action. Evolution 64(5):1517-1528.
- Mooney H, Larigauderie A, Cesario M, Elmquist T, Hoegh-Guldberg O, Lavorel S, Mace GM, Palmer M, Scholes R, and T Yahara. 2009. Biodiversity, climate change and ecosystem services. Current Opinion in Environmental Sustainability, 1(1):46-54.
- Leemans R, Rice M, Asrar G, Canadell JG, Ingram J, Larigauderie A, Melillo JM, Mooney H, Nobre C, Schmidt F et al. 2009. Developing a common strategy for integrative global change research and outreach: the earth System Science Partnership. Current Opinion in Environmental Sustainability, 1(1):4-13.
- RJ Scholes, GM Mace, W Turner, G Geller, N Juergens, A Larigauderie, D Muchoney, B Walther and HA Mooney. 2008. Towards a global biodiversity observing system, Science, vol 321, 1044-45 (22 Aug 2008).
- Loreau M, Oteng-Yeboah A, Arroyo M, Babin D, Barbault R, Donoghue M, Gadgil M, Häuser C, Heip C, Larigauderie A, Ma K, Mace G, Mooney H, Perrings C, Raven P, Sarukhan J, Schei P, Scholes R, and Watson R. 2006. Diversity without representation. Nature 442: 245–6.

== Distinctions ==
- Officer of the Legion of Honour (2019). Knight (2009)
