= Land systems =

Land systems constitute the terrestrial component of the Earth system and encompass all processes and activities related to the human use of land, including socioeconomic, technological and organizational investments and arrangements, as well as the benefits gained from land and the unintended social and ecological outcomes of societal activities. Changes in land systems have large consequences for the local environment and human well-being and are at the same time pervasive factors of global environmental change. Land provides vital resources to society, such as food, fuel, fibres and many other ecosystem services that support production functions, regulate risks of natural hazards, or provide cultural and spiritual services. By using the land, society alters and modifies the quantity and quality of the provision of these services.

Land system changes are the direct result of human decision making at multiple scales ranging from local land owners decisions to national scale land use planning and global trade agreements. The aggregate impact of many local land system changes has far reaching consequences for the Earth System, that feedback on ecosystem services, human well-being and decision making. As a consequence, land system change is both a cause and consequence of socio-ecological processes.

The Global Land Programme (GLP) of Future Earth is an interdisciplinary community of science and practice fostering the study of land systems and the co-design of solutions for global sustainability.
