= Geotraces =

International marine chemistry research programme

GEOTRACES
- Project type: Marine chemistry
- Sponsors: SCOR, COST, US-NSF, CNRS, UPS-OMP, GEOMAR, NRM, Tōdai, UBC, NIOZ, AWI, NERC, Indian Ministry of Earth Sciences
- Objective: Biogeochemical cycles
- Location: Toulouse, France
- Duration: 2005 – Present
- Website: www.geotraces.org

GEOTRACES is an international research programme for improving understanding of marine biogeochemical cycles.

GEOTRACES is organised internationally under the auspices of the Scientific Committee on Oceanic Research (originally under the International Council for Science). Its management is overseen by a Scientific Steering Committee (SSC), with representatives of 15 nations from across the globe, and the programme involves active participation of more than 30 nations.

== Genesis ==
The concept of cycle describes the pathway by which a chemical element moves through the three major compartments of Earth (such as continents, atmosphere, and ocean). Because these cycles are directly related to climate dynamics and are heavily impacted by global change, it is essential to quantify them.

GEOTRACES focuses on the oceanic part of the cycles, with the ambition to map the distribution of trace elements and isotopes in the ocean and to understand the processes controlling this distribution. Some of these trace elements are directly linked to climate via, for example, their role as essential nutrients for life; others allow quantification of ocean processes (origin and dynamics of matter, age of water masses, etc.); some of them are pollutants (for example, lead or mercury). Modelling based on the data collected will thus achieve substantial progress in understanding the current and past of the ocean and improve projections of the ocean’s response to global change.

After some years in the planning and enabling phase, the GEOTRACES Science Plan was published in 2006 and the GEOTRACES programme formally launched its seagoing effort in January 2010. This phase is expected to last a decade.

== Challenges and benefits ==
Trace elements serve as regulators of biological processes in the ocean, influencing marine ecosystem dynamics and the carbon cycle. Despite this significance, knowledge of the marine biogeochemical cycles of these essential micronutrients is surprisingly incomplete. GEOTRACES is quantifying the supply, removal, internal cycling, chemical form and distribution of essential micronutrients and other trace elements. Understanding the sensitivity of these biogeochemical cycles to changing environmental conditions will improve projections of the ocean’s response to global change.

The cycles of many trace elements and isotopes have been impacted significantly by human activity, which has increased the discharge of harmful elements into the ocean. GEOTRACES’ emphasis on understanding the processes regulating the marine biogeochemical cycles of trace elements will improve prediction of the transport and fate of contaminants in the ocean and thereby help to protect the ocean environment.

Much of what is known about ocean conditions in the past and, therefore, about the ocean’s role in climate variability is derived from trace element and isotope patterns recorded in marine archives (sediments, corals, etc.). Greater knowledge of the processes governing these tracers in the modern ocean will improve interpretation of ocean conditions in the past, from which more reliable prediction of future changes can be made.

== Goals ==
Benefits will be realised by pursuing two overarching goals:

- To determine global ocean distributions of selected trace elements and isotopes, and to evaluate the sources, sinks, and internal cycling of these species in order to characterise more completely the physical, chemical and biological processes regulating their distributions.
- To understand the response of trace element and isotope cycles to global change, to help predict the future and to improve chemical proxies for past changes in the ocean environment.

== Activities ==
=== GEOTRACES cruises ===
The central component of GEOTRACES is a series of cruises spanning the global ocean and sampling the full water column. These dedicated GEOTRACES cruises collect seawater for analysis of a wide range of trace element and isotopes. This strategy is guided by the principle that more will be learned through complementary investigation of multiple trace elements than can be achieved in an exhaustive study of one element in isolation.

The first GEOTRACES cruise was cruise GPc06 in August 2005 in the North Pacific, though the program was officially launched in January/February 2010. The first U.S. GEOTRACES cruise was in fall 2010 on the R/V Knorr in the North Atlantic.

=== Intercalibration ===
Ensuring accuracy of the results is essential if GEOTRACES is to build a meaningful global dataset. To this end, the Standards and Intercalibration (S&I) Committee is in charge of securing that truthful and precise data are generated in the GEOTRACES Program through the use of appropriate sampling protocols, analytical standards and certified reference materials, and the active sharing of methods and results.

Since the concentration, activity, or chemical speciation of a trace element or isotope can be affected by sampling methods, sample handling, and analytical determinations, GEOTRACES follows the strategy of cruises to occupy a common station along their transects. At the same time two U.S.-led cruises (2008 and 2009) provided samples for intercalibration to laboratories from many countries. Seawater samples are available for use by other labs that wish to join this effort.

Simple data comparisons like depth profiles show whether there are disagreements and, if so, the investigators can examine their methods and even data work ups to identify and remedy the problems.

=== Data management ===
Compilation of data into secure and readily searchable databases ensures ease of use and is fundamental to the success of the programme. The GEOTRACES Data Assembly Centre (GDAC) is responsible for the compilation, quality control and secure archiving of data received from national data centers and from core international GEOTRACES cruises. It has as its main aims the integration of core GEOTRACES data into global data sets, and making this data accessible to participating scientist and the larger science community according to the GEOTRACES data policy. The GDAC is hosted at the British Oceanographic Data Centre and a dedicated committee with international representation oversees it.

== GEOTRACES Data Products ==
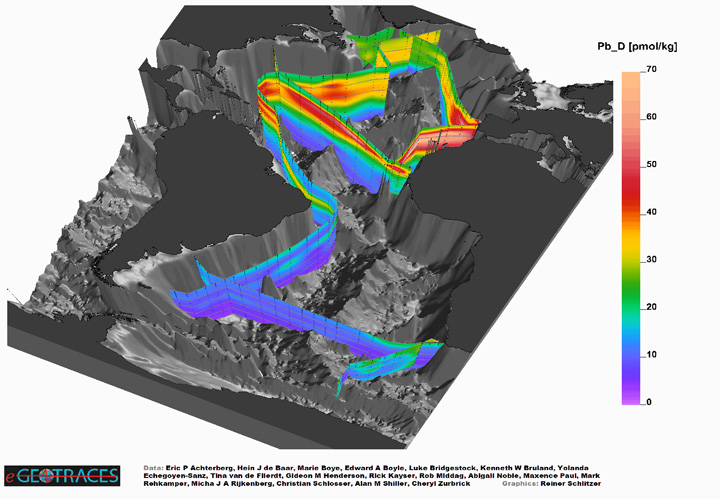
This 3D scene shows the distribution of dissolved lead (Pb) in the Atlantic. At a depth of about 500 to 2,000 metres a red band runs across the Atlantic Ocean. It indicates relatively high lead concentrations. The increased concentrations are due to emissions of car exhaust gases in Europe and North America that found their way into the environment prior to the introduction of unleaded petrol. In the image South America is on the left while Africa is on the right.

GEOTRACES Data Products are freely available on-line. The third Intermediate Data Product (IDP2021) was released in November 2021. It contains hydrographical and marine geochemical data acquired during the first 10 years of the programme. The main motivation for distributing the product at this time is to strengthen and intensify collaboration with the broader ocean research community. At the same time, GEOTRACES is seeking feedback to improve future data products.

The GEOTRACES Intermediate Data Product consists of two parts: the digital data package and the eGEOTRACES Electronic Atlas.

The digital data package (available at http://www.bodc.ac.uk/geotraces/data/dp) contains data from 77 cruises and more than 800 hydrographic and geochemical parameters. The data covers the global ocean, data density being the highest in the Atlantic.

The eGEOTRACES Electronic Atlas (available at www.egeotraces.org) is based on the digital data package and provides 2D and 3D images of the ocean distribution of many of the parameters. The 3D figures provide geographical context crucial for correctly assessing extent and origin of tracer plumes as well as for inferring processes acting on the tracers and shaping their distribution. The numerous links to other tracers, sections and basins found on section plots and 3D animations allow quick switching between parameters and domains and facilitate comparative studies. In addition, eGEOTRACES can help in teaching and outreach activities and can also facilitate conveying societally relevant scientific results to interested laymen or decision makers.

== Organizational structure ==
The GEOTRACES SSC was initially led by co-chairs, Prof. Robert F. Anderson of the Lamont–Doherty Earth Observatory (Columbia University) and Prof. Gideon M. Henderson from University of Oxford. Eventually, the co-chairs transitioned to Dr. Maeve Lohan of the University of Southampton and Dr. Karen Casciotti from Stanford University.

In 2018, the SSC chairs were occupied by Phoebe Lam (University of California, Santa Cruz) and Andy Bowie (University of Tasmania).
