= Yvon Le Maho =

French ecophysiologist

- Born: 7 September 1947 (age 79); Goderville, Normandy, France
- Employer: University of Strasbourg
- Known for: Ecophysiology

Yvon Le Maho (born 7 September 1947 in Goderville) is a French ecophysiologist and research director at the CNRS at the University of Strasbourg.

== Biography ==
He was elected correspondent of the French Academy of sciences on 22 March 1993, then member (in the Integrative Biology section) on 28 October 1996. He was involved in the Grenelle de l'environnement and drafted a report on GMO maize in which he clearly expressed his opposition to GMOs, drawing in particular on the work of Gilles-Éric Séralini and Corinne Lepage of the CRII-GEN foundation.

== Publications ==
- (in English) "Ecophysiology: Nature and function", Nature 416, 21 (2002)

In collaboration with

- (in English) A. Ancel, G.L. Kooyman, P.J. Ponganis, J.-P. Gendner, J. Lignon, X. Mestre, N. Huin, P.H. Thorson, P. Robisson, Y. Le Maho, « Foraging behaviour of emperor penguins as a resource detector in winter and summer », Nature, 360: 336-339 (1992)
- (in English) A. Ancel, H. Visser, Y. Handrich, D. Masman, Y. Le Maho, « Energy saving in huddling penguins », Nature, 385: 304-305 (1997).
- (in English) Y. Handrich, R. M. Bevan, J.-B. Charrassin, P. J. Butler, K. Putz, A. J. Woakes, J. Lage & Y. Le Maho., « Hypothermia in foraging king penguins », Nature 388, 64-67 (1997).
- (in English) M. Gauthier-Clerc, Y. Le Maho, Y. Clerquin, S. Drault, Y. Handrich, « Penguin fathers store food for their chicks », Nature, 408: 928-929 (2000).
- Luc Abbadie, Gilles Bœuf, Allain Bougrain-Dubourg, Claudine Cohen, Bruno David, Philippe Descola, Françoise Gaill, Jean Gayon, Thierry Hoquet, Philippe Janvier, Yvon Le Maho, Guillaume Lecointre, Valérie Masson-Delmotte, Armand de Ricqlès, Philippe Taquet, Stéphanie Thiébault et Frédérique Viard, Paris, Reliefs/MNHN, 2017, 80 p. (ISBN 978-2-8565-3811-1).
