= Walter C. Oechel =

- Born: January 15, 1945 (age 81)
- Spouse: Donatella Zona
- Scientific career
- Fields: Ecophysiology, systems ecology, biosphere-atmosphere interaction, and global change.

Walter C. Oechel (born January 15, 1945) is a researcher who studies the areas of plant eco-physiology, systems ecology, global change, and biosphere-atmosphere interaction. At San Diego State University he is as a Distinguished Professor of Biology, as well as at the Open University, UK. He is also co-director of the Center for Climate and Sustainability Studies (C2S2) and the director of the Global Change Research Group at SDSU.

== Research ==
Oechel has published over 250 papers and his H index is 71. His journal papers have been cited more than 22,000 times. He started his research in eco-physiology with Boyd Strain and WD Billings and moved on to ecosystem studies, global change research, and biosphere-atmosphere interaction. He discovered loss of CO_{2} from Arctic ecosystems due to global warming and limits to CO_{2} fertilization effects in the Arctic. With NSF funding, he developed the first university owned and operated EC flux aircraft anywhere in the world, the Sky Arrow 650TCN Environmental Research Aircraft for CO_{2}, H_{2}O, energy and latter CH_{4}.

During the 1980s, Oechel led a team studying global warming at Toolik Lake and Barrow, Alaska to measure the greenhouse gases emitted by high Arctic vegetation, where they found evidence that the ground was emitting more gases than it was absorbing, changing the previous understanding of how the Arctic works in the global climate system.

In 2009 he released a further study showing that wetlands developing in Alaska emitted even more greenhouse gases than the previously frozen tundra. Part of the principle behind these studies is that the Arctic ice had been pulling carbon dioxide out of the atmosphere over the millennia, which was released as ice melted due to global warming. He has also shown that the world's oceans add more to the total greenhouse gas emissions than human activity does, adding substantially to global warming issues. The National Science Foundation in 2004 wrote that,

Oechel's extensive work on CO_{2} on every continent except Antarctica has had important implications for understanding global warming. His efforts impact virtually every aspect of research on climate change and ecosystems science. His use of cutting-edge technology has provided near real-time ecophysiological data on the Web for many K-20 classrooms, and he has developed K-12 interactive science education among United States and Mexico border schools.

That year he was named a Distinguished Teaching Scholar by the National Science Foundation, receiving the Director's Award for Distinguished Teaching Scholars, NSF's highest award for combinative teaching and research excellence. Later, Oechel and Donatella Zona coinvented an on-demand heating system for atmospheric measuring towers in order for Arctic scientists to take measurements year-round.

This system allowed the discovery of large fall emissions in methane loss from the Arctic, especially during the fall "Zero Curtain" period. It also allowed the discovery that upland, non-inundated tundra can be a more active emitter of methane than wet, inundated areas changing the perception of the importance of the cold season and upland tundra on annual methane emission balances. Oechel has studied the importance of marine coastal and riverine systems on the global C balance in Arctic, temperate, and tropical regions.

In 2014, Oechel was named one of the "World's Most Influential Scientific Minds", rated by Thomson Reuters, topping the "agricultural sciences" category. In 2015, Oechel co-developed a study with Harvard, NASA, and other institutions that showed methane was also being released into the atmosphere during the winter months from the ground of the Arctic than previously believed, increased the amount of presumed greenhouse gases released globally per year.

Oechel has appeared on national news shows discussing the problem of climate change, such as, ABC News and The Washington Post.
