= Polar seas =

Collective term for the Arctic Ocean and the southern part of the Southern Ocean

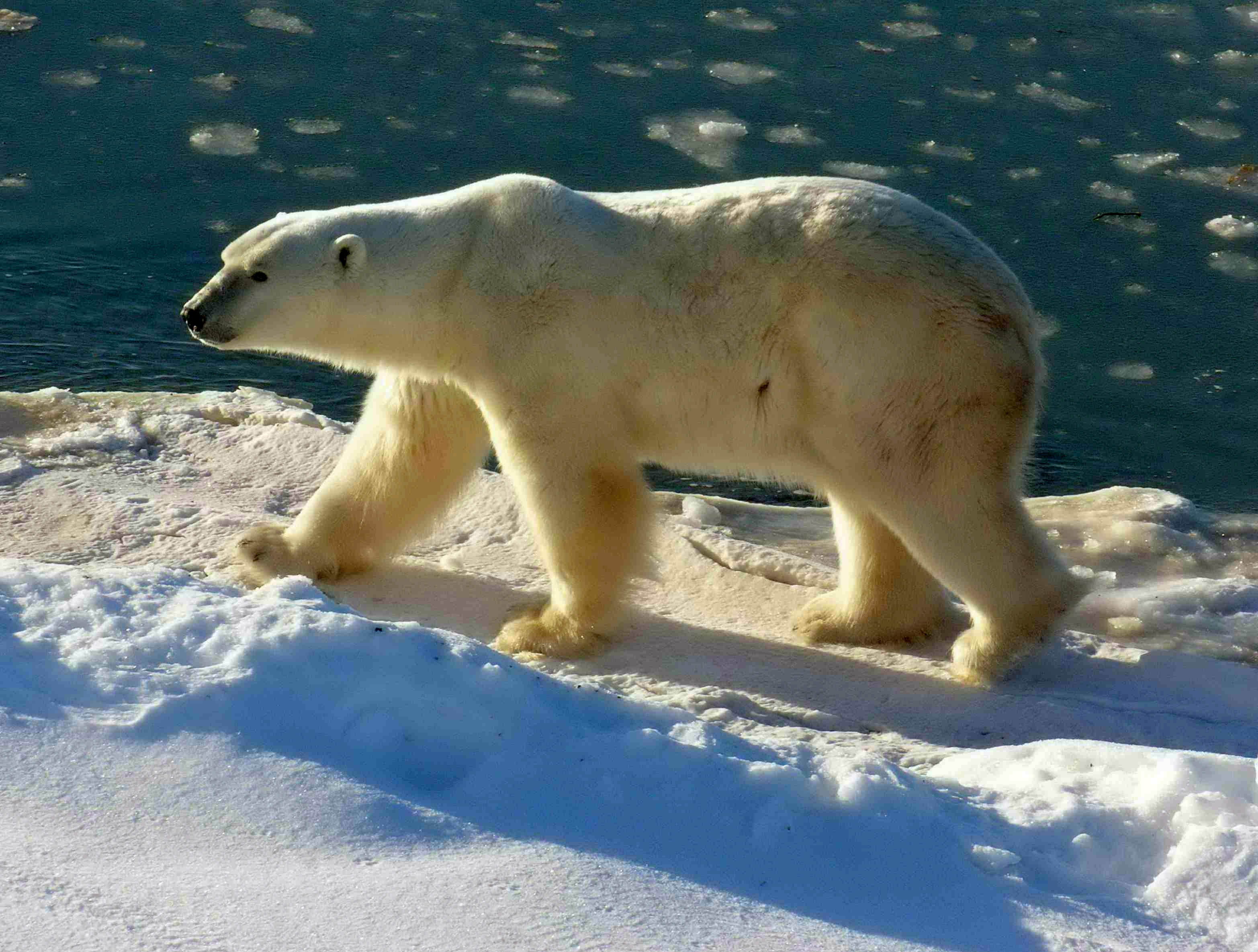
Polar bear in Manitoba, Canada. November 2004.

Polar seas is a collective term for the Arctic Ocean (about 4-5 percent of Earth's oceans) and the southern part of the Southern Ocean (south of Antarctic Convergence, about 10 percent of Earth's oceans). In the coldest years, sea ice can cover around 13 percent of the Earth's total surface at its maximum, but out of phase in the two hemispheres. The polar seas contain a huge biome with many organisms.

Among the species that inhabit various polar seas and surrounding land areas are polar bears, reindeers (caribou), musk oxen, wolverines, ermines, lemmings, Arctic hares, Arctic ground squirrels, whales, harp seals, and walruses. These species have unique adaptations to the extreme conditions. Many might be endangered if they cannot adapt to changing conditions. Contrary to popular opinion, the World Wildlife Fund studies for polar bears show that this species have prospered since 1950, attaining five times the numbers found in 1950. In general, Arctic ecosystems are relatively fragile and slow to recover from serious damage.

== Arctic ==
A large amount of the land in the north polar region is part of Earth's tundra biome. South of the Arctic tundra, where temperatures are a little less cold, are the vast forests of conifer trees of the taiga biome. North of the Arctic tundra are polar bears and the unique marine life of the Arctic Ocean.

The Arctic Ocean has relatively abundant plant life. Nutrients from rivers along with mixing and upwelling from storms contribute mixed layer nutrients which are essential for Arctic phytoplankton development. During summer, nearly continuous solar insolation encourages phytoplankta blooms. The Arctic Ocean is surrounded by continents and has a few narrow, relatively shallow connections to the large ocean basins to the south. Large amounts of riverine fresh water as well as abundant nutrients (gelbstoff) flow into the Arctic basin from Siberian rivers. The widest continental shelf on the planet is found in the Arctic Ocean, extending more than 1000 kilometers outward from Siberia and Alaska. Consequently, much of the basin is very shallow. On the other hand, the Arctic Ocean contains the deepest, slowest spreading mid-ocean ridge on the planet which, until 2003, was thought to be inactive volcanically. Since then, however, a dozen active volcanoes have been discovered, illustrating the limited information available for the difficult-to-study Arctic Ocean. The numerous Siberian rivers flowing onto the shallow continental shelf freshen the seawater. These rivers have shown increased flow recently, possibly due to increased global rainfall as a result of climate change. A flow increase may raise the level of riverine nutrients. Severe Siberian drought, as experienced in 2010, could, however, decrease flows. There is an interest in a potential release of methane gas, a potent greenhouse gas, from methane clathrates present in the Arctic continental shelf sediments, if sufficient ocean warming were to occur. As much as 80% of the ocean surface is covered by ice in winter, declining to about 60% in summer; Ice cover has been declining at a steady and rapid pace. A large fraction of the ice is multi-year ice, and in the far North the thickness can be more than 2m. In summer, ice tends to melt at the air-sea interface. Surface melt ponds are formed, increasing the albedo.

== Antarctic ==
Most of Antarctica is covered with a thick layer of ice, with few species permanently living in the ice-covered areas. There are many species of penguins in the south polar region. Almost all animals in Antarctica find their food in the Southern Ocean surrounding the continent, and there is abundant marine life in the Southern Ocean.

Because of the extreme but constant habitats, small disruption or damage could alter the polar systems. Although they are remote from human world, polar seas are not 'pristine' environments. Compared with the Antarctic region, the Arctic has long history of interaction with man. The polar food web structure can be sensitive to man's 'top-down' control especially with the development and growth of industrial fishing. Climate change is a natural phenomenon that influences life in polar areas. There is observational evidence that the Antarctic climate is a bellwether for climate change in the northern hemisphere, leading by about 1000 years. The study of Antarctic ice, its distribution, changes in ice volume, and other indicators of the continental climate in Antarctica are at an early stage of development and even earlier stage of understanding. Techniques for studying the terrain beneath the ice are just being explored. Lake Vostok, buried under miles of ice, has not been penetrated to date. There is evidence that it has been out of contact with the atmosphere for millions of years, making it a possible treasure trove of information.

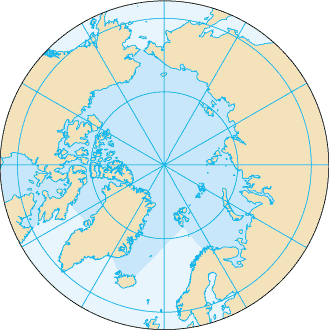
Arctic Ocean

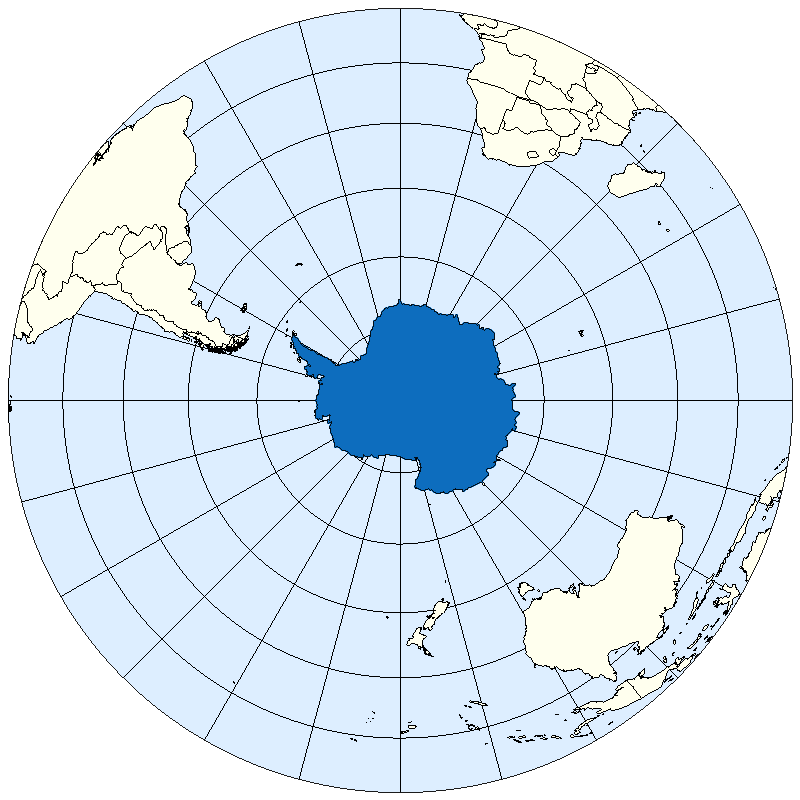
Antarctic and Southern Ocean

Relatively, the Antarctic seas and Southern Ocean surround the highest, driest, coldest and windiest continent on the Earth - Antarctica. Due to the low mean temperature, there is no riverine input into the Antarctic seas. And little input DOM, POC from land. In addition to relatively thin sea ice, thick and extensive ice shelves (floating glaciers) are present in the Antarctic region. More than 90% of the sea ice is first year (annual) ice and less than 2m thick. The first confirmed sighting of Antarctica can date back to 1820.

== Role in global climate ==
The polar seas play an important role in the global climate:

- Carbon export/carbon sequestration: Effects concentration of carbon dioxide in the Earth's atmosphere.
- Dimethylsulfoniopropionate (DMSP/DMS) production: DMSP/DMS serves as the nucleus in cloud formation and changes the regional albedo and precipitation.
- Earth's energy budget: clouds increase albedo, sea-ice increases albedo, ice shelves increase albedo etc.
- Formation of deep and bottom waters: the polar areas are the source of ocean deep and bottom cold waters. Due to the sinking of cold and dense saline waters near Greenland, and at the Antarctic Convergence, among other sites, the global ocean circulation is maintained.

Models predict a latitudinal effect in response to climate change. These would be expected to be first obvious in polar and subpolar regions. The decline of arctic ocean summer ice coverage was assumed to be one such sign, however, the reversal of that trend leaves the question open as the origins of the now reversed 30 year trend. In 1979, the cover of Time magazine was illustrated with an image of arctic ice covering and expanding BEYOND the arctic basin, opinion seems to have little value. Real data reveal the trend of ice coverage to be on the increase. If this increase will continue, only time will tell. Developed nations ceased the production and use of chlorofluorocarbons and the atmospheric abundance and consequent ozone depletion are generally on the decrease. ozone hole Breaking-off of polar ice shelves is a continuing process with increases in Western Antarctica balanced by decreases in Eastern Antarctica. Careful study has revealed that the volume of ice in Western Antarctica was incorrectly estimated and shows no significant change attributable to climate change over the observation period.

== Characteristics ==
Extreme oscillations in irradiance occur in these regions, for months it may be totally dark (in winter) or light (in summer). Because of the existence of polar ice, surface reflectance of sunlight is very high. In addition the solar angle are relatively quite low. So less light can penetrate into water and becomes bio available to the plants in polar water under the ice cover. Water temperatures are low, but do not change much seasonally. The low temperature and low available high irradiance together limit primary production. Major nutrients (N, P, Si) are often not limiting primary production. Blooming of Phytoplankton happens in summer, because of the decreased salinity (sea ice melt-water), lower mixing, higher stratification, higher temperature and more bio available light.

Ice is very important in structuring environment. It regulates the physics, chemistry and biology of the water column, air-sea exchange, and is also an important habitat.

== Development ==
There is an expected rise in the exploration and development of the Polar Seas due to an increasing demand for fuel and commodities. The emergence of China and India's economy is considered one of the main drivers of this phenomenon due to an unprecedented appetite for raw materials and fuel.

Presently, there are still no exact figures that define the oil and gas reserves in the Polar Seas. Initial explorations, however, have resulted in the identification of its potential. For example, Canada's explorations discovered gas and oil in several Arctic locations such as Beaufort, High Arctic (Arctic Islands), Labrador, and Newfoundland. The Arctic Islands alone has an estimated 4.3 billion barrels of oil reserve while those locations that fall within the Alaskan continental shelf have potential recoverable reserves worth $18 billion.

There are now 46 nations that are parties to cooperation and treaties covering the polar regions. Several of these, either individually or with partners, conduct research and explorations in the Arctic and Antarctic seas. These activities are governed by international environmental protocols. However, countries like China, which faces a future oil shortage, are aggressively exploring the region for the purpose of oil extraction despite an international ban on such activity.
