= Surface Ocean Lower Atmosphere Study =

The Surface Ocean Lower Atmosphere Study (SOLAS) is a global and multidisciplinary research project dedicated to understanding the key biogeochemical-physical interactions and feedbacks between the ocean and the atmosphere. Further, SOLAS seeks to link ocean-atmosphere interactions with climate and people. Achievements of these goals are essential in order to understand and quantify the role that ocean-atmosphere interactions play in the regulation of climate and global change.

SOLAS was first initiated with an Open Science Conference in 2000 and was formally launched in 2004. Since then, the SOLAS community has grown into a worldwide network with 1075 members and 30 national networks around the world. Development and implementation of the SOLAS science plan is guided by a scientific steering committee (SSC) composed of international experts covering a broad spectrum of disciplines, including atmospheric chemistry, oceanography, marine biology, and legal sciences.

SOLAS science is currently organised around five core research themes, namely: 1) Greenhouse gases and the oceans; 2) Air-sea interface and fluxes of mass and energy; 3) Atmospheric deposition and ocean biogeochemistry; 4) Interconnections between aerosols, clouds, and marine ecosystems; and 5) Ocean biogeochemical control on atmospheric chemistry. The five SOLAS core research themes are complemented by cross-cutting themes on key environments (such as upwelling systems, polar oceans, and the Indian Ocean), as well as on evaluating the environmental efficacy and impacts of climate intervention proposals, policy decisions, and societal developments.

Since 2000, SOLAS has organised seven international Open Science Conferences and seven Summer Schools tailored to students and early career earth scientists. In addition, to these large-scale events, SOLAS also organises meetings, workshops, and conference sessions related to SOLAS science.

The SOLAS project is coordinated by an International Project Office (IPO), which is currently hosted by GEOMAR Helmholtz Centre for Ocean Research Kiel, Germany, in association to the research unit chemical oceanography, with a nodal office hosted by the State Key Laboratory of marine Environmental Science at Xiamen University, China. The SOLAS IPO works in close cooperation with the SOLAS SSC chair to provide international science coordination and strengthen capacity building within the SOLAS science community.

SOLAS is sponsored by Future Earth, the International Commission on Atmospheric Chemistry and Global Pollution (iCACGP), Scientific Committee on Oceanic Research (SCOR), and World Climate Research Programme (WCRP).
