= Partnership for Observation of the Global Ocean =

Organisation

- Abbreviation: POGO
- Formation: 1999
- Type: Consortium of major oceanographic institutions around the world
- Purpose: To promote global operational oceanography
- Region served: Global
- Members: 56
- Leader: Capt. Francisco Arias Isaza

The Partnership for Observation of the Global Ocean (POGO), which was founded in 1999, is a consortium of major oceanographic institutions around the world, represented by their directors. POGO's goal is to promote global operational oceanography, the implementation of a Global Ocean Observing System, and the importance of ocean observations for society. As of 2023, POGO has 56 member organizations. The current chair is Captain Francisco Arias Isaza (INVEMAR, Colombia).

It is supported from annual dues subscribed by the members, as well as by grants from charitable foundations. The establishing funds for POGO were provided by the Alfred P. Sloan and Richard Lounsbery foundations.

POGO provides a forum (at the annual meetings and intersessionally) for members to meet with peers and senior officials of partner organisations to discuss issues of mutual concern. To ease the shortage in trained observers of the ocean in developing countries, it has developed a suite of programmes in capacity building, and works with relevant partner organisations in the marine field SCOR, IOC, GOOS, GEO). It engages in outreach activities to the general public such as hosting exhibits at international events such as Expo 2012 Yeosu Korea, UNFCCC COP Meetings and AGU-ASLO-TOS Ocean Sciences Meetings.

== History ==
In March 1999, the Directors of Scripps Institution of Oceanography, Woods Hole Oceanographic Institution, and the Southampton Oceanography Centre in the UK, convened a planning meeting in the headquarters of the Intergovernmental Oceanographic Commission of the United Nations Education, Science and Culture Organisation (IOC-UNESCO) in Paris. This meeting confirmed the value of creating a new partnership and defined the initial mission statement and terms of reference.

Scripps Institution of Oceanography hosted the first formal meeting in early December 1999, which included senior officials from 17 institutions in 12 countries (as well as representatives of the IOC, the Scientific Committee for Oceanic Research (SCOR) of the International Council for Science (ICSU), the Committee on Earth Observation Satellites (CEOS) and several international scientific programs. At this meeting, there was agreement on an initial work plan, including development of an advocacy plan for observing systems; participation in processes to secure governmental commitments to fund ocean observing systems; a data interchange demonstration pilot project; and establishment of a clearinghouse for information exchange among POGO members, as well as the broader community.

== POGO Capacity Building ==
- The Nippon Foundation - POGO Centre of Excellence in Observational Oceanography (currently hosted by the Ocean Frontier Institute, Canada). An annual program in which ten scientists from developing countries are supported to study for ten months in an intensive programme related to ocean observations.
- The POGO-SCOR Visiting Fellowship programme, for scientists from developing countries to spend up to three months in a major oceanographic institution. The programme is carried out in conjunction with POGO's partner organisation SCOR.
- The NF-POGO Ocean Training Partnership programme, under which early-career scientists participate in major oceanographic cruises, and spend time at a participating major oceanographic institute before and after the cruise to experience cruise preparation and data analysis. (2008+).

Under POGO capacity-building schemes, roughly 1,300 early-career scientists from over 90 countries have received advanced training. Former scholars or alumni of NF-POGO training become members of the NF-POGO Alumni Network for Oceans (NANO).

== Activities ==
In its São Paulo Declaration of 2001, POGO drew attention to the world imbalance between Northern and Southern Hemispheres in the capacity to observe the oceans, resulting in its establishment of a capacity-building programme (above). It also underlined the relative scarcity of ocean observations in the Southern Hemisphere compared with the Northern Hemisphere, and POGO member JAMSTEC, organised a circumnavigation of the Southern Hemisphere, the BEAGLE Expedition, using its ship RV Mirai, at a cost estimated to be around $35M. More recently, selected Antarctic Expeditions of the Alfred Wegener Institute have been labelled POGO Expeditions. POGO also supports the Southern Ocean Observing System.

Around the time POGO was being started, the Argo programme was also beginning.

The GEO Secretariat was established during the early years of POGO. Oceans did not appear among the nine societal-benefit areas around which GEO was structured at that time. POGO advocated for a greater prominence of ocean observing activities within GEO, which led the creation of a new Ocean Task (SB01, Oceans and Society: Blue Planet) in the 2012-2015 GEO Work Plan. This was expanded and further developed into what is now known as the GEO Blue Planet Initiative.

POGO contributed to OceanObs'09 in Venice in 2009, as well as participating in the post-Venice Framework for Ocean Observing Committee. POGO was also a sponsor of the OceanObs'19 conference in Honolulu, USA.

POGO member institutions have been driving the establishment of OceanSites (coordinated, deep-ocean, multi-disciplinary time-series reference sites), which has made significant progress in recent years.

The idea for an "International Quiet Ocean Experiment" first came up during one of the POGO Annual Meetings. With seed funding from the Sloan Foundation, the idea was further developed in partnership with SCOR. An Open Science Meeting was convened under the auspices of SCOR and POGO at IOC-UNESCO, Paris, in August–September 2011, to develop a Science Plan for the project, which could last up to ten years.

== Members ==
POGO currently has 56 member institutions across 31 countries. A full list of current members can be found on the POGO website.

== Secretariat ==
The Secretariat is hosted by Plymouth Marine Laboratory in the UK, with a satellite office hosted by the University of Algarve in Portugal.
