= IMBER =

International project for marine research

IMBeR
- Integrated Marine Biosphere Research
- Abbreviation: IMBeR
- Predecessor: OCEANS, GLOBEC
- Formation: 2001
- Founder: IGBP/SCOR Ocean Futures Planning Committee
- Founded at: Plouzané, France.
- Type: NGO
- Purpose: Oceanography research
- Headquarters: Institute of Marine Research P.O. Box 1870 Nordnes 5817 Bergen, Norway
- Locations: IMBeR International Project Office Institute of Marine Research P.O. Box 1870 Nordnes 5817 Bergen, Norway; Regional Project Office: East China Normal University (ECNU) 3663 North Zhongshan Road, Shanghai, China China 200062
- Website: IMBeR Webpage

IMBeR (Integrated Marine Biosphere Research) is a Future Earth-SCOR sponsored international project that promotes integrated marine research through a range of research topics towards sustainable, productive and healthy oceans at a time of global change, for the benefit of society.

== Overview ==
IMBeR research seeks to identify the natural mechanisms by which marine life influences marine biogeochemical cycles, and how these, in turn, influence marine ecosystems and how anthropogenic activities are impacted and impact on the oceans. In 2008, it engaged in the GLOBEC-IMBER Transition Task Team (TTT), and upon TTT's recommendations, IMBER entered into its second phase at the end of 2009, aiming to cover marine ecosystem research with associated latest technical and academic development. The GLOBEC research programme was to be finished by end 2008. Both GLOBEC and IMBER board members held meetings in the UK and the US to confer the plan.

Central to the IMBeR goal is the development of a predictive understanding of how marine biogeochemical cycles and ecosystems respond to complex forcing, such as large-scale climatic variations, changing physical dynamics, carbon cycle chemistry and nutrient fluxes, and the impacts of marine harvesting. Changes in marine biogeochemical cycles and ecosystems due to global change will also have consequences for the broader Earth System. An even greater challenge will be drawing together the natural and social science communities to study some of the key impacts and feedbacks between the marine and human systems.

== IMBeR International Project Office ==
The IMBeR International Project Office (IPO) coordinates and organizes international activities of the project, provides a structure for data management for IMBeR projects, ensures financial management of the project, and promotes IMBeR in the wider scientific community. It was inaugurated at the Maritime Institute of European University, University of Western Brittany in Plouzané, France.

== Other offices ==
East China Normal University (ECNU) in Shanghai holds the regional office for IMBeR at their "State Key Laboratory of Estuarine and Coastal Research."

The Ocean Frontier Institute, based at Dalhousie University in Halifax administers the Canadian project office of the Integrated Marine Biosphere Research (IMBeR) program.

== Publications ==
The first IMBER Science Plan and Implementation Strategy (SPIS) was published in 2005. The latest publication of "IMBeR SPIS 2017" has been released in 2017.

- Pollard, R. T; Moncoiffé, Gwen; O'Brien, Todd D; Integrated Marine Biogeochemistry and Ecosystem Research (2011). The IMBER data management cookbook: a project guide to good data practices (PDF). Plouzané, France: IMBER IPO Secretariat, IUEM, University of Western Brittany. OCLC 722790912.

== See also ==
- Institute of Marine Research, Bergen
- International Geosphere-Biosphere Programme
- International Science Council
- East China Normal University
- Future Earth
- National Centre for Polar and Ocean Research
- National Institute of Polar Research (Japan)
- National Marine Biological Library, Plymouth.
- The Research Council of Norway
- University of Cape Town
- Woods Hole Oceanographic Institution
