= Scientific Committee on Oceanic Research =

Interdisciplinary body of the International Science Council

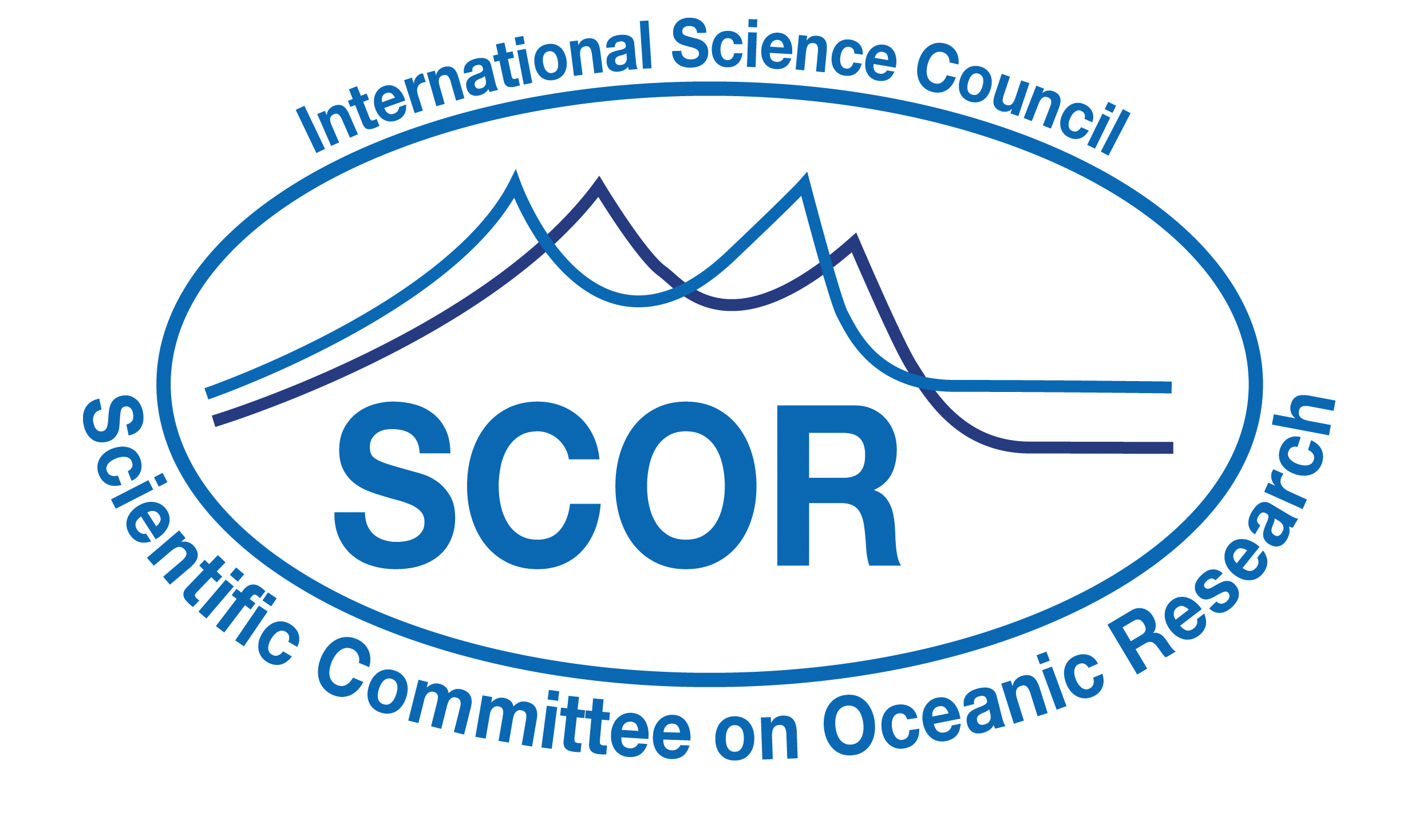
- Abbreviation: SCOR
- Formation: 1957; 69 years ago
- Type: INGO
- Region served: Worldwide
- Official language: English
- Parent organization: International Science Council
- Website: scor-int.org

The Scientific Committee on Oceanic Research (SCOR) is an interdisciplinary body of the International Science Council. SCOR was established in 1957, coincident with the International Geophysical Year of 1957-1958. It sought to bring scientists together to answer key ocean science questions and improve opportunities for marginalised scientists.

From 1959 through to 1988 SCOR organised a sequence of Joint Oceanographic Assemblies. Following these, SCOR has focused its efforts on targeted scientific working groups. These small international groups are designed to address narrowly focused scientific topics based on proposals from independent groups of scientists, national committees for SCOR, other scientific organizations, or previous working groups. The working groups last typically for three to four years. SCOR activity, often through the efforts of working groups, has helped support the development of many large-scale ocean research projects.

== SCOR-associated programs ==
IIOE
International Indian Ocean Expedition (IIOE) resulted from the first annual SCOR meeting, held at Woods Hole Oceanographic Institution in 1957. The meeting identified the Indian Ocean as the least known component in the global ocean system and so that a campaign of focused observations would be of great benefit. The initiative commenced in 1959 and observational work carried on until 1965.
TOGA
the Tropical Ocean-Global Atmosphere Study (TOGA) was coordinated by the World Climate Research Programme (WCRP) and made great observation-based advances in understanding of El Niño and improved skills in predicting the occurrence of El Niño events.
WOCE
The World Ocean Circulation Experiment (WOCE) ran from 1990-2002 and aimed to gather more ocean observations in a way that enabled improved modelling tools.
GEOTRACES
The GEOTRACES programme was solely sponsored by SCOR and continues to advance knowledge of the oceanic contribution to global biogeochemical cycles of trace elements and their isotopes.
JGOFS
The Joint Global Ocean Flux Study focused on the role of the ocean in the global carbon cycle and completed its work in 2003. JGOFS was co-sponsored by SCOR and the International Geosphere-Biosphere Programme (IGBP).
GLOBEC
The Global Ocean Ecosystem Dynamics project, completed in 2009, focused on the relationship between physical and biological variability in the ocean and how global change might impact the structure and functioning of marine ecosystems, with particular emphasis on important fisheries. GLOBEC was co-sponsored by SCOR, IGBP, and IOC.
IMBER
SCOR and IGBP developed the Integrated Marine Biogeochemistry and Ecosystem Research (IMBER) project that promotes integrated marine research through a range of research topics towards sustainable, productive and healthy oceans at a time of global change, for the benefit of society.
SOLAS
Surface Ocean – Lower Atmosphere Study (SOLAS) is sponsored by SCOR, IGBP, the World Climate Research Programme (WCRP) and the Commission on Atmospheric Chemistry and Global Pollution (CACGP). It is global and multidisciplinary in its approach to understanding the key biogeochemical-physical interactions and feedbacks between the ocean and the atmosphere. Additionally, SOLAS seeks to link ocean-atmosphere interactions with climate and people.
GEOHAB
Global Ecology and Oceanography of Harmful Algal Blooms project examines the ecological and oceanographic conditions that cause harmful algal blooms and promote their development. It is supported by SCOR and IOC.
IQOE
International Quiet Ocean Experiment (co-sponsored by the Partnership for Observation of the Global Oceans) and designed to examine questions around human activities affecting the global ocean soundscape compared with natural changes over geologic time.
IIOE-2
Second International Indian Ocean Expedition (co-sponsored by IOC and the Indian Ocean GOOS program) was a major global scientific program which will engage the international scientific community in collaborative oceanographic and atmospheric research from coastal environments to the deep sea over the period 2015-2020.
SOOS
The Southern Ocean Observing System (SOOS) facilitated by both SCOR and the Scientific Committee on Antarctic Research, supports observations, the associated science community and data access, with a focus on the Southern Ocean.
