= Future Earth =

2012 environmental research program

Future Earth is an international research program which aims to build knowledge about the environmental and human aspects of Global change, and to find solutions for sustainable development. It aims to increase the impact of scientific research on sustainable development.

Future Earth is an interdisciplinary research programme bringing together natural and social sciences, as well as the humanities, engineering and law, and focused on designing and producing research together with stakeholders from outside the scientific community.

== Mission and principles ==
Future Earth's mission is to "build and connect global knowledge to intensify the impact of research and find new ways to accelerate sustainable development". Its vision is for "people to thrive in a sustainable and equitable world". To do this, Future Earth aims to mobilize the international community of global environmental science researchers to:

- Inspire and create interdisciplinary science relevant to major global sustainability challenges
- Deliver products and services that society needs to meet these challenges
- Co-design and co-produce solutions-oriented science, knowledge and innovation for global sustainable development
- Build capacity among scholars world-wide

== History ==
Future Earth was launched in June 2012, at the UN Conference on Sustainable Development (Rio+20).

A globally distributed consortium was appointed as the Secretariat of Future Earth in July 2014, with offices in Montreal (Canada), Stockholm (Sweden), Colorado (USA), Tokyo (Japan) and Paris (France).

There are now nine Global Secretariat Hubs. The additional offices are in Africa, China, South Asia and Taipei. A Global Coordination Hub announced in 2024 is hosted by the Julie Ann Wrigley Global Futures Laboratory® at Arizona State University.

== Projects ==
Scientific research and synthesis in Future Earth is carried out by a number of international networks, known as ‘global research networks’, many of which were launched under the umbrella of the existing four global environmental change programmes, DIVERSITAS, the International Geosphere-Biosphere Programme (IGBP), the International Human Dimensions Programme (IHDP) and the World Climate Research Programme (WCRP). Some further projects arose out of the Earth System Science Partnership (ESSP). A formal process for the affiliation of these projects into Future Earth began in 2014. The projects are:

- AIMES (Analysis, Integration and Modelling of the Earth System)
- bioDISCOVERY
- EvolvES (formerly bioGENESIS)
- oneHEALTH (formerly ecoHEALTH)
- ESG – Earth System Governance
- Finance and Economics Knowledge-Action Network
- Future Earth Coasts (Formerly LOICZ – Land-Ocean Interactions in the Coastal Zone)
- GCP – Global Carbon Project
- GLP – Global Land Project
- GMBA – Global Mountain Biodiversity Assessment
- Health Knowledge-Action Network
- IGAC – International Global Atmospheric Chemistry
- IHOPE – Integrated History and Future of People on Earth
- ILEAPS – Integrated Land Ecosystem-Atmosphere Processes Study
- IMBER – Integrated Marine Biogeochemistry and Ecosystem Research
- IRG – Integrated Risk Governance Project
- MAIRS – Monsoon Asia Integrated Regional Study
- Natural Assets Knowledge-Action Network
- Ocean Knowledge Action Network
- PAGES – Past Global Changes
- PECS – Programme on Ecosystem Change and Society
- Risk Knowledge-Action Network
- SOLAS – Surface Ocean-Lower Atmosphere Study
- Systems of Sustainable Consumption and Production Knowledge-Action Network
- Urban Knowledge-Action Network
- Water Future
- Water-Energy-Food Nexus Knowledge-Action Network

== See also ==
- International Council for Science
- Great acceleration
