= Southern Ocean Observing System =

International initiative

Southern Ocean Observing System (SOOS)
- Abbreviation: SOOS
- Formation: 2011; 15 years ago
- Type: INGO
- Headquarters: University of Tasmania
- Region served: Southern Ocean
- Parent organization: SCOR, SCAR
- Website: soos.aq

Southern Ocean Observing System (SOOS) is an international initiative of the Scientific Committee on Antarctic Research (SCAR) and the Scientific Committee on Oceanic Research (SCOR). It was officially launched in 2011. Its International Project Office is hosted by the Institute for Marine and Antarctic Studies (IMAS), University of Tasmania, Australia.

The Southern Ocean, encircling Antarctica, constitutes the southernmost part of the World Ocean. It plays a critical role in the Earth's climate system, serving as a major reservoir of heat and carbon. The importance of the Southern Ocean in regulating global climate and oceanic circulation is well established. In recent decades, the Southern Ocean has experienced rapid climate change, leading to significant global implications.

Recent observations have highlighted critical changes in the Southern Ocean, including record low levels of sea-ice extent, record high temperatures, and dramatic shifts in penguin populations, among other notable transformations. However, the chronic lack of observations in this region hampers our ability to detect and assess the full extent of these changes.

SOOS is designed to aid the collection and delivery of essential observations on the dynamics and change of Southern Ocean systems to all international stakeholders (researchers, governments, industries). It seeks to enable the design, advocacy and implementation of cost-effective observing and data delivery systems.
