= Jentsje Wouter van der Meer =

Dutch coastal engineer and professor

- Born: 1955 (age 70–71)
- Education: Delft University of Technology
- Occupations: Coastal engineer, researcher, professor, consultant
- Known for: Van der Meer formula, EurOtop Overtopping Manual, Wave Overtopping Simulator
- Scientific career
- Fields: Coastal engineering
- Workplaces: IHE Delft Institute for Water Education

Jentsje Wouter van der Meer is a Dutch coastal engineer, researcher, professor and consultant. He is known for his research on wave–structure interaction, breakwater design, wave overtopping and the stability of coastal structures. He is the founder and principal of Van der Meer Consulting b.v.

== Education and career ==
Van der Meer earned a BSc in Architecture from the Technical College in Leeuwarden in 1976, followed by an MSc in Civil Engineering from Delft University of Technology in 1981 and a PhD from Delft University of Technology in 1988.

He worked at Delft Hydraulics as a project engineer and project manager and later served as head of the Coastal Structures Department and Deputy Director of the Harbours, Coasts and Offshore Technology Division. He subsequently worked at Infram, where he was head of the Engineering Department from 1997 to 2007. In 2007, he established Van der Meer Consulting b.v.

From 2014 to 2021, he was a part-time Professor of Coastal Structures and Ports at IHE Delft Institute for Water Education. He is also an emeritus professor at IHE Delft and Delft University of Technology.

== Research and technical contributions ==
=== Van der Meer formula ===
In the 1980s, Van der Meer developed practical design formulae describing the stability of rubble-mound revetments and breakwaters under random wave attack. His work was based on extensive physical model testing and addressed variables including wave period, number of waves, armour grading, spectrum shape, wave groupiness and core permeability.

These stability formulae became widely used in the design of rubble-mound breakwaters and revetments. His doctoral research, Rock slopes and gravel beaches under wave attack, was completed at Delft University of Technology in 1988.

=== EurOtop ===
Van der Meer was one of the principal contributors to the EurOtop manual on wave overtopping of sea defences and related structures. The manual brought together research from the United Kingdom, the Netherlands, Germany and Belgium and was published as a freely available engineering guidance document.

The first edition was published in 2007, and a second edition was published in 2018, with Van der Meer serving as an editor of the second edition.

=== Wave Overtopping Simulator ===
Van der Meer developed the Wave Overtopping Simulator in 2006 as part of the ComCoast project and Dutch research on water defences. The device is a mobile water-storage system that releases controlled volumes of water at specific intervals to simulate wave overtopping on the crest and inner slope of a dike, levee or embankment.

The simulator was subsequently used for full-scale destructive testing of dikes and levees, including research into the resistance of grass-covered inner slopes to wave overtopping.

The technology was later adapted for use outside the Netherlands, including a larger simulator developed for the United States.

=== Cumulative Overload Method ===
Research using the Wave Overtopping Simulator contributed to the development of methods for assessing the strength and erosion resistance of grass-covered dikes under wave overtopping. This research included full-scale destructive tests on Dutch dikes and levees.

== Publications and manuals ==
Van der Meer has authored or co-authored approximately 250 papers in international journals, conference proceedings and books.

Selected publications and books include:

- The Rock Manual: The Use of Rock in Hydraulic Engineering (2007), as a contributor.
- EurOtop: Manual on Wave Overtopping of Sea Defences and Related Structures (2007; revised 2018), with Van der Meer as editor of the 2018 edition.
- Design and Construction of Berm Breakwaters (2016), co-authored with Sigurdur Sigurdarson.

His work has contributed to numerous design formulations concerning coastal-structure stability, wave overtopping, wave transmission, wave reflection and related coastal engineering processes.

== Advisory roles and teaching ==
Van der Meer has taught breakwater design and related coastal-engineering subjects at IHE Delft and UNESCO-IHE for several decades, including international courses for engineers and researchers.

He has served on technical advisory committees concerning water defences and coastal engineering in the Netherlands, including the Technical Advisory Committee on Water Defences (TAW) and its successor organisations.

He has also worked as an expert and consultant on the design and assessment of breakwaters, coastal structures, dikes and other hydraulic infrastructure in several countries.

== Professional affiliations ==
Van der Meer is a member of professional engineering organisations including the American Society of Civil Engineers (ASCE), KIVI and PIANC. He is also a Diplomate in Coastal Engineering (D.CE) of the Academy of Coastal, Ocean, Port & Navigation Engineers (ACOPNE).

== Awards and honours ==
- Halcrow Premium (1987), awarded by the British Institution of Civil Engineers.
- T.K. Shieh Award (1992), awarded by the British Institution of Civil Engineers.
