= All We Can Save =

2020 anthology of environmental writings

- Editor: Ayana Elizabeth Johnson; Katharine Wilkinson
- Publication date: September 22, 2020
- Website: allwecansave.earth

All We Can Save is a 2020 collection of essays and poetry edited by Dr. Ayana Elizabeth Johnson and Dr. Katharine Wilkinson and published by One World. The collection sets out to highlight a wide range of women's voices in the environmental movement, most of whom are from North America. The book represents a wide range of essays, and creative works by over 50 women involved in climate change activism, science, and policy.

All We Can Save focuses on building a feminine and feminist voice in the climate movement. Many commentators focused on the broad range of perspectives included in the book. Sierra magazine commentator Wendy Becktold called the book a "big tent" and "grab bag" approach to communicating the climate crisis—one that "feels like just what we need right now.” Rolling Stone’s Phoebe Neidl said the book was “a feast of ideas and perspectives, setting a big table for the climate movement, declaring all are welcome.”

== History ==
=== Origins ===
Johnson and Wilkinson decided to create the anthology while attending a conference where the conversation was dominated by white male voices, with the aim of highlighting the breadth and diversity of climate leadership.

The book's title was inspired by the closing stanza of Adrienne Rich's poem “Natural Resources”.

"My heart is moved by all I cannot save:

so much has been destroyed

I have to cast my lot with those

who age after age, perversely,

with no extraordinary power,

reconstitute the world."

== Content ==
=== Reception ===
Reception was broadly very positive, listing the book on a number of best seller and "best of 2020" lists. Smithsonian magazine named it one of the top 10 best science books for 2020. Wendy Becktold from Sierra magazine positively reviewed the book "All We Can Save is a powerful tool because it articulates and holds space for this complexity." Ms. magazine reviewer Sarah Montgomery focused on the urgency of the collection in light of the climate crisis, calling it a "sorely needed glimmer of hope—a reminder that there is a way out of this mess: collective action." The book was featured in numerous nonfiction best sellers lists, including the Los Angeles Times, The Washington Post, and Porchlight Books.

=== Notable press ===
Among the readers of the book are many notable women leaders, including Roxane Gay, Jane Fonda, Emma Watson, and Maria Papova. The book was featured in many publications with interviews from Johnson and Wilkinson, including The Today Show, The Washington Post, Time magazine, and Democracy Now!.

== Contributors ==
Authors contributing to the book include:

- Emily Atkin
- Xiye Bastida
- Ellen Bass
- Colette Pichon Battle
- Jainey K. Bavishi
- Janine Benyus
- adrienne maree brown
- Régine Clément
- Abigail Dillen
- Camille T. Dungy
- Rhiana Gunn-Wright
- Joy Harjo
- Katharine Hayhoe
- Jane Hirshfield
- Mary Anne Hitt
- Ailish Hopper
- Tara Houska Zhaabowekwe
- Emily N. Johnston
- Joan Naviyuk Kane
- Madeleine Jubilee Saito (illustrator)
- Naomi Klein
- Kate Knuth
- Ada Limón
- Louise Maher-Johnson
- Kate Marvel
- Gina McCarthy
- Anne Haven McDonnell
- Sarah Miller (writer)
- Sherri Mitchell aka Weh’na Ha’mu Kwasset
- Susanne C. Moser
- Lynna Odel
- Sharon Olds
- Mary Oliver
- Kate Orff
- Jacqui Patterson
- Leah Penniman
- Catherine Pierce (poet)
- Marge Piercy
- Kendra Pierre-Louis
- Varshini Prakash
- Janisse Ray
- Christine E. Nieves Rodriguez
- Favianna Rodriguez
- Cameron Russell
- Ash Sanders
- Judith D. Schwartz
- Patricia Smith
- Emily Stengel
- Sarah Stillman
- Leah Cardamore Stokes
- Amanda Sturgeon
- Maggie Thomas
- Heather McTeer Toney
- Alexandria Villaseñor
- Alice Walker
- Amy Westervelt
- Jane Zelikova

== Audiobook narrators ==
Narrators of the audiobook include:

- Alfre Woodard (Indigenous Prophecy and Mother Earth; Collards Are Just as Good as Kale; An Offering from the Bayou)
- America Ferrera (On Fire; Harnessing Cultural Power; Mothering in an Age of Extinction; Like the Monarch)
- Cristela Alonzo (The Politics of Policy; Mending the Landscape; Solutions Underfoot; A Field Guide for Transformation; Community Is Our Best Chance)
- Ilana Glazer (A Handful of Dust; We Are Sunrise; Under the Weather)
- Jane Fonda (Reciprocity; How to Talk About Climate Change; Catalytic Capital; The Adaptive Mind; The Seed Underground)
- Janet Mock (What Is Emergent Strategy?; Wakanda Doesn't Have Suburbs; At the Intersections)
- Julia Louis-Dreyfus (Beyond Coal; Heaven or High Water; Public Service for Public Health; Water Is a Verb)
- Kimberly Drew (A Green New Deal for All of Us; A Tale of Three Cities; Sacred Resistance; Solutions at Sea)
- Bahni Turpin (Calling In; Truth Be Told; Home Is Always Worth It; Black Gold; A Letter to Adults)
- Sophia Bush (Litigating in a Time of Crisis; Becoming a Climate Citizen; Buildings Designed for Life; Dear Fossil Fuel Executives; Loving a Vanishing World)
- Ayana Elizabeth Johnson and Katharine K. Wilkinson (Begin; Onward; Gratitude; all poems; and additional material read)

== The All We Can Save Project ==
Alongside the publication of All We Can Save in 2020, Wilkinson and Johnson co-founded The All We Can Save Project, which is an independent operating project of the umbrella nonprofit organization Multiplier. Its mission is to nurture the “we” for all we can save and a "leaderful" climate community to grow a life-giving future.

The All We Can Save Project provides open-source resources to support engagement with All We Can Save, including a self-led reading group model called All We Can Save Circles, resources for educators teaching the anthology, and resources for working with climate emotions.
