= Jainey K. Bavishi =

American resilience and sustainability expert

Jainey Bavishi
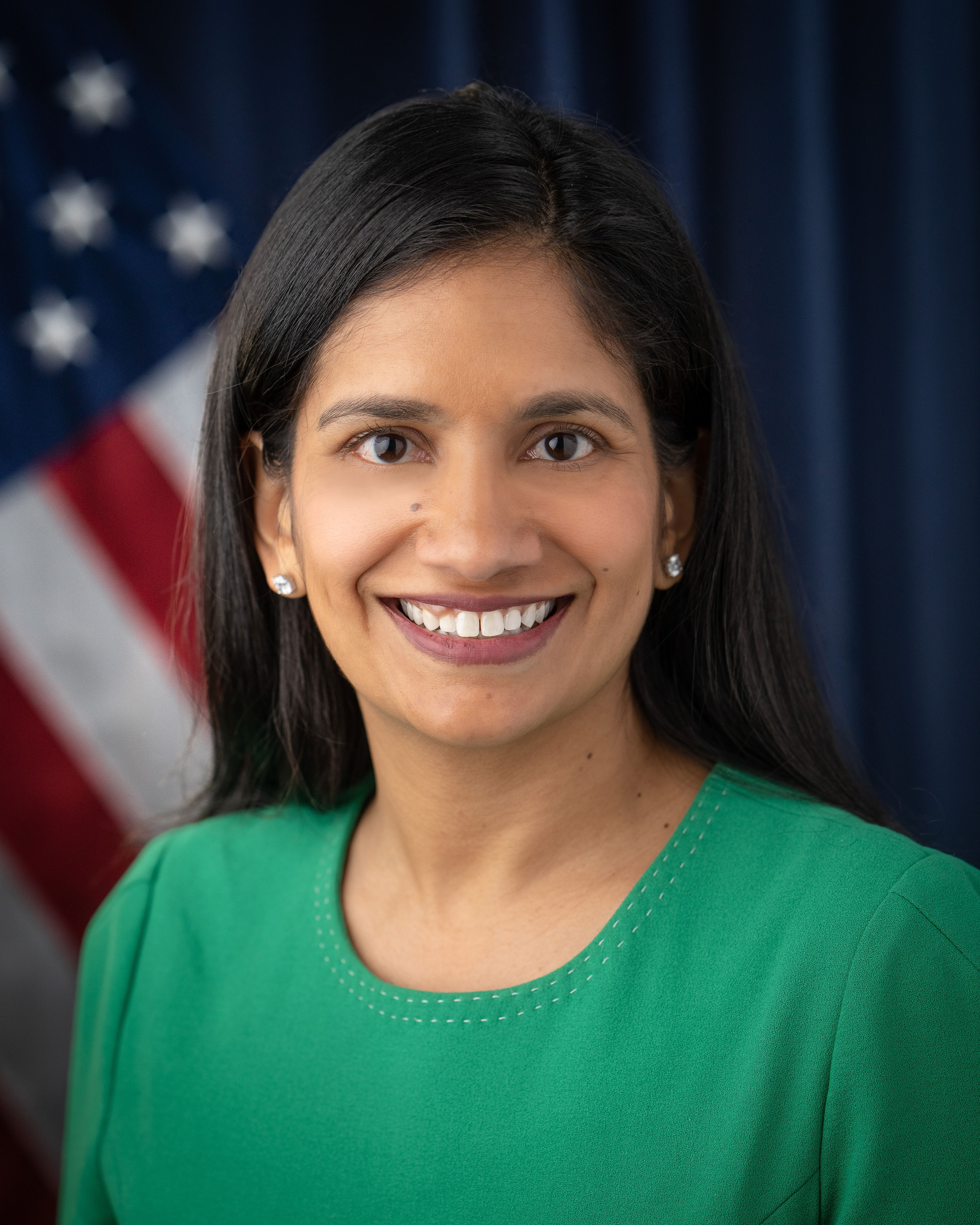

Assistant Secretary of Commerce for Oceans and Atmosphere
- In office January 17, 2023 – January 20, 2025
- President: Joe Biden
- Preceded by: Timothy Gallaudet
- Succeeded by: Timothy Petty

Director of the New York City Mayor’s Office of Climate Resiliency
- In office January 2017 – December 2021
- Mayor: Bill de Blasio
- Preceded by: Position Established
- Succeeded by: Kizzy Charles-Guzman

Personal details
- Education: Duke University (BA in public policy studies and cultural anthropology); Massachusetts Institute of Technology (MCP)

Jainey Kumar Bavishi is a nationally recognized expert in climate adaptation and resilience who served from January 2023 to January 2025 as the assistant secretary of commerce for oceans and atmosphere, as well as the deputy administrator of the National Oceanic and Atmospheric Administration (NOAA), in the Biden administration.

She served as the director of the New York City Mayor's Office of Climate Resiliency from 2017–2022. She oversaw a $20 billion plan to prepare New York City for the impacts of climate change, including along the 520 miles of the city’s coastline. Bavishi was the associate director for climate preparedness at the White House Council on Environmental Quality during the Obama administration, where she led the implementation of the climate preparedness pillar of the president's Climate Action Plan.

== Career ==
In 2017, New York City mayor Bill de Blasio appointed her as the director of the New York City mayor's Office of Recovery and Resiliency. She oversaw a $20 billion plan to help New York City prepare for the impacts of climate change, including sea level rise, intense rain and extreme heat. Mayor Bill de Blasio established the office in 2014, which includes a team of urban planners, architects, engineers, lawyers, and policy experts who use scientific evidence to develop programs and policies that address impacts of climate change.

Bavishi has also led nonprofit initiatives in the Gulf Coast after Hurricane Katrina and in the Asia-Pacific region. As of July 2025, she has served as a board member for Woodwell Climate Research Center.

Bavishi is a contributing author to the anthology, All We Can Save, edited by Ayana Elizabeth Johnson and Katharine Wilkinson.

== US Commerce Department Nomination ==
On July 28, 2021, President Joe Biden nominated Bavishi for the position of Assistant Secretary for Oceans and Atmosphere in the U.S. Department of Commerce, as well as the deputy administrator of the NOAA. Hearings were held before the Senate Commerce Committee on her nomination on November 17, 2021. The committee favorably reported her nomination to the Senate floor on December 1, 2021. Bavishi's initial nomination expired at the end of the year and was returned to President Biden on January 3, 2022.

President Biden resent Bavishi's nomination the following day. On March 3, 2022, the committee favorably reported her nomination to the Senate floor once again. The Senate confirmed her nomination on December 22, 2022. She assumed office on January 17, 2023.
