= Emily Atkin =

American environmental journalist

- Born: United States
- Occupation: Journalist
- Years active: 2010s–present
- Employer: Independent (HEATED)
- Known for: Climate change reporting; author of HEATED newsletter

Emily Atkin is an American environmental reporter and writer, best known for founding the daily climate newsletter HEATED. She also launched a podcast by the same name to explore the intersectional issues highlighted by the COVID-19 pandemic.

Previously she was a reporter for The New Republic and ThinkProgress. She is a contributor to the anthology All We Can Save, edited by Ayana Elizabeth Johnson and Katharine K. Wilkinson, and a columnist at MSNBC.

Atkin was raised in New York, and went to school at State University of New York at New Paltz for journalism.
