= Conservation International Samoa =

Country programme of Conservation International in Samoa

- Abbreviation: CI Samoa
- Formation: 2006 (programme began)
- Type: Country programme
- Headquarters: Apia, Samoa
- Region served: Samoa
- Fields: Ocean planning; Marine conservation; marine spatial planning; community resilience; environmental education
- Parent organization: Conservation International
- Website: samoa.conservation.org

Conservation International Samoa (CI Samoa) is the country programme of Conservation International in Samoa. Conservation International has worked in Samoa since 2006.

Its work in Samoa spans ocean planning and marine conservation, community resilience, and environmental education, and biodiversity assessment in coastal and terrestrial Key Biodiversity Areas. Programme activities have included support for the Samoa Ocean Strategy 2020-2030 and the Samoa Marine Spatial Plan, the Guardians environmental education programme, and biodiversity fieldwork in forests, reefs, and other priority sites.

In June 2025, Samoa legally adopted the Samoa Marine Spatial Plan 2025-2035, which was designed to fully protect 30% of the country's ocean area while sustainably managing the remainder, including nine new fully protected marine protected areas covering about 14,000 sq mi.

== Overview ==
Based in Apia, Conservation International Samoa works nationally with government agencies, communities, and researchers across Samoa's ocean domain, coastal communities, and terrestrial and coastal key biodiversity areas. Its programme links land and sea management through a ridge-to-reef and reef-to-ocean approach.

Its thematic work includes ocean governance and marine spatial planning, community resilience and environmental education, sustainable forestry and agriculture, and biodiversity data collection and assessment in key biodiversity areas.

== History ==
Conservation International has worked in Samoa since 2006.

A policy foundation for its later ocean work was laid in 2017, when Samoa announced 12 voluntary commitments under Sustainable Development Goal 14 at the United Nations Ocean Conference. These included commitments on community-based fisheries management, mangrove rehabilitation and protection, waste management, marine protected areas, and the Sa Moana Folauga ocean-voyage initiative.

Development of Samoa's broader ocean-strategy framework was underway by 2018, and the marine spatial planning initiative began in 2019 with support from the European Union and technical support from the IUCN.

After Cabinet approval in September 2020, the Samoa Ocean Strategy 2020-2030 was officially launched in Apia on 16 October 2020. The launch was accompanied by a memorandum of understanding linking the Government of Samoa, Conservation International, and the Waitt Foundation and Blue Prosperity Coalition in support of implementation.

In 2021, Samoa established the National Ocean Steering Committee (NOSC) as the co-ordinating mechanism for implementing the ocean strategy. The committee had a high-level advisory and decision-making role and was supported by Governance and Policies and Technical working groups. Pandemic-related disruptions later curtailed meetings and delayed implementation, leaving costing, delivery timelines, and monitoring and evaluation arrangements underdeveloped.

Stakeholder consultations and public-awareness activities continued in 2021 and 2022, and supporting studies were prepared as part of the planning process. In 2024, the draft Samoa Marine Spatial Plan 2024-2034 was released for public consultation and published by the Ministry of Natural Resources and Environment. The later Samoa Marine Spatial Plan 2025-2035 was legally adopted in June 2025 with zoning that included fully protected areas as well as zones for cooperative management and general use.

== Programmes and operations ==
Selected programme locations mentioned in the article (1 Apia; 2 Aleipata (Upolu); 3 national waters (marine spatial planning))

=== Ocean strategy and marine spatial planning ===
Conservation International Samoa supports Samoa's ocean governance through the Samoa Ocean Strategy 2020-2030 and the Samoa Marine Spatial Plan, working with the Ministry of Natural Resources and Environment, the Ministry of Agriculture and Fisheries, and other stakeholders on the government-led planning process. The strategy covers Samoa's territorial sea and exclusive economic zone, approximately 46,000 sq mi, and the adopted Samoa Marine Spatial Plan 2025-2035 applies across Samoan waters.

The marine spatial planning process combined government-led steering structures with multi-stage consultation and technical studies. It was overseen through national steering and technical arrangements, and consultations between 2021 and 2023 included 45 workshops across 185 coastal village communities, four key stakeholder sectors, and a second round of 40 community-wide consultations covering 175 villages in 53 electoral districts. Further sector consultations were carried out alongside studies on marine legal issues, ecosystem service valuation, and special and unique marine areas.

Ocean-planning work linked to the programme also featured in wider international policy settings. In April 2024, Samoa participated in the Blue Prosperity Leaders Forum in Athens, convened by coalition partners including Conservation International ahead of the Our Ocean Conference. Later that year, ocean protection featured prominently at the Commonwealth Heads of Government Meeting in Apia, where leaders adopted the Apia Ocean Declaration.

The 2024 consultation draft of the marine spatial plan set out four principal zone types: fully protected area, special management, cooperative management, and general use. The later plan was legally adopted in June 2025 and included nine new fully protected marine protected areas covering about 14,000 sq mi, within a broader framework intended to fully protect 30% and sustainably manage 100% of Samoa's ocean area.

=== Nearshore and community-managed areas ===
The marine spatial plan was designed to sit alongside existing nearshore and community-managed conservation tools rather than replace them. The Samoa Ocean Strategy 2020-2030 set a goal that by 2030 an official network of coastal and community-managed areas, including fish reserves and marine protected areas, would be established, and the 2025 adoption of the marine spatial plan stated that existing nearshore community-managed areas such as fish reserves and district marine protected areas would be incorporated and strengthened. Community Integrated Management plans also remain part of Samoa's wider ocean-policy framework alongside sectoral management tools.

This nearshore layer also sits within Samoa's fisheries-management framework. The Fisheries Management Act 2016 provides for fisheries conservation and management using precautionary and ecosystem approaches, while Samoa's Community Based Fisheries Management Program operates as a bottom-up system in which village communities take primary responsibility for managing fisheries resources and the marine environment with technical support from government. Village fisheries management plans and village reserves have also been used as tools to rebuild inshore fisheries and improve sustainable use.

Coral reefs in districts such as Aleipata have also been discussed in the wider literature as natural buffers against extreme waves on Samoan coasts.

=== Forestry, biodiversity, and key biodiversity areas ===
On land, Conservation International Samoa works with communities and the government on sustainable forestry and agriculture, assessment of climate change impacts on upland forest ecosystems, and the development and management of key biodiversity areas in Samoa. Its terrestrial fieldwork has included biodiversity mapping and rapid biodiversity assessment surveys intended to inform environmental policy and site management.

Eight terrestrial key biodiversity areas have been identified in Samoa, covering about 360 sq mi or 33% of the country's land area. These sites capture key habitat for eight of the 11 terrestrial species then classified as threatened on the IUCN Red List and about 65% of Samoa's native forests. The Central Savaii Rainforest was identified as the largest single priority for expansion of Samoa's protected-area network and, at about 280 sq mi, the largest intact block of rainforest in tropical Polynesia.

In 2012, upland Savai'i underwent a rapid biodiversity assessment to improve knowledge of a globally important but poorly studied montane and cloud-forest region. The information gathered was intended to support conservation management decisions with Savai'i land-owning communities, government departments, and other partners, and it reinforced the upland forests as a priority for expansion of Samoa's conservation area network.

In 2016, further biodiversity fieldwork in the Falealupo Peninsula Coastal Rainforest, Central Savai'i Rainforest, and Uafato-Ti'avea Coastal Rainforest key biodiversity areas, together with a review of the Apia Catchments site, highlighted the need for rainforest protection and restoration, invasive-species management, long-term ecological monitoring, and indicator species for tracking ecosystem change in forest ecosystems, including cloud-forest plants and high-altitude birds.

=== Environmental education and community resilience ===
Conservation International Samoa has supported environmental education and community resilience through the Guardians programme, a va'a-based campaign launched in 2018 with the Samoa Voyaging Society and government and regional partners. The programme used the traditional voyaging canoe Gaualofa as a floating classroom, and its initial phase took the canoe to Aleipata with learning modules on waste management, coral reefs, trees, fisheries, and voyaging.

By 2020, the campaign had become part of the education and outreach strand associated with the Samoa Ocean Strategy. Hands-on activities included sailing instruction, coral observation, mangrove biodiversity learning, and practical lessons linked to climate change and community resilience. The 2020 campaign comprised four community-based workshops for Year 7 students, and more than 400 students from 20 primary schools completed the programme.

In 2022, the programme worked with the Samoa Voyaging Society on the Manaaki project, supported through New Zealand's Manaaki Fund, using the Gaualofa to deliver activity-based environmental education in at least four districts in Samoa and to begin planning similar programming in Tokelau. In the 2024/25 financial year, the Guardians programme included a training-of-trainers workshop and a first student-outreach phase in Sagaga District that engaged 305 students from 20 schools, in partnership with Conservation International, the Ministry of Natural Resources and Environment, the Ministry of Agriculture and Fisheries, and the Samoa Voyaging Society.

Selected marine, forest and education contexts of Conservation International Samoa
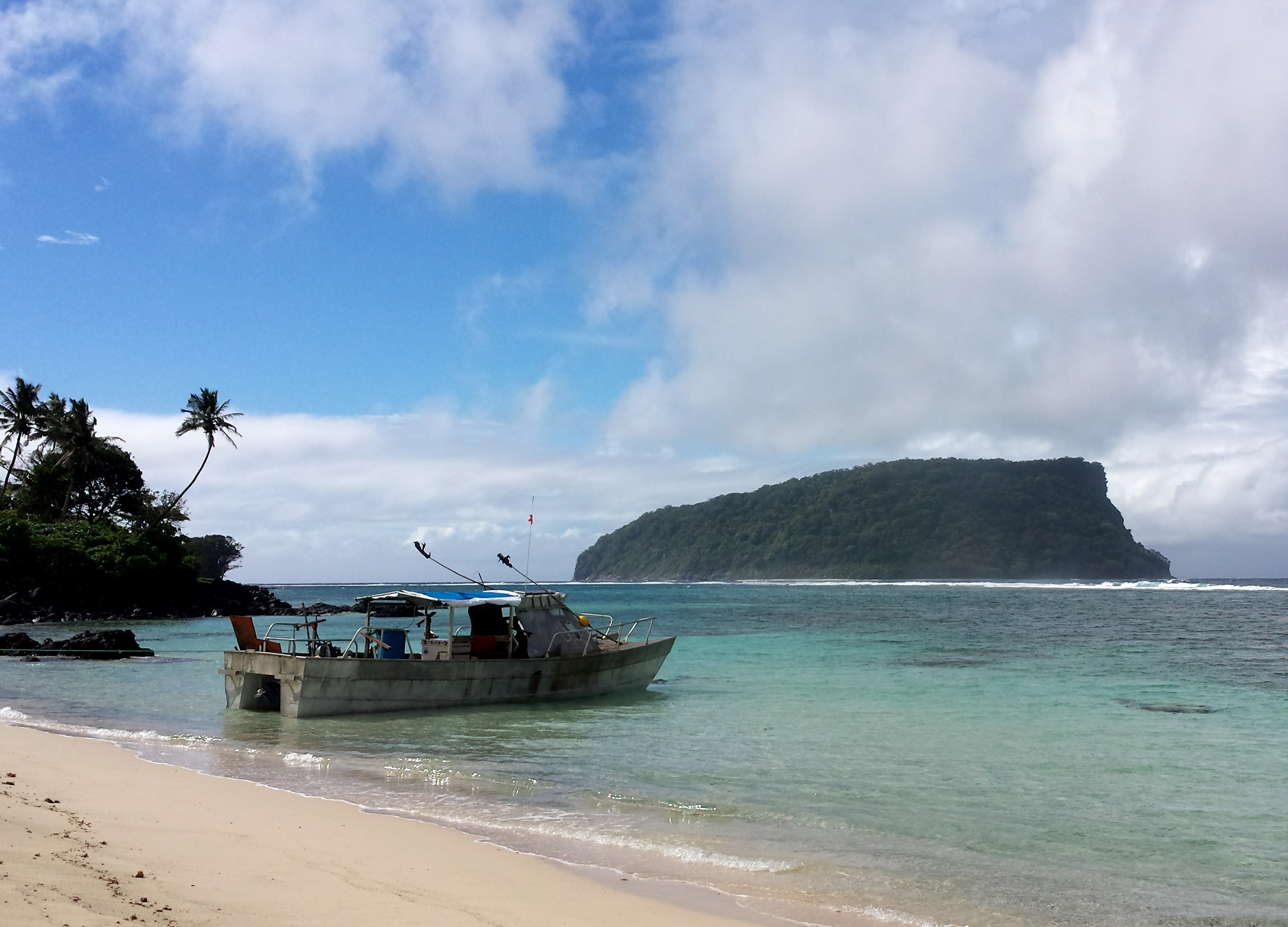
Nu'utele in the Aleipata Islands, viewed from Lalomanu on eastern Upolu

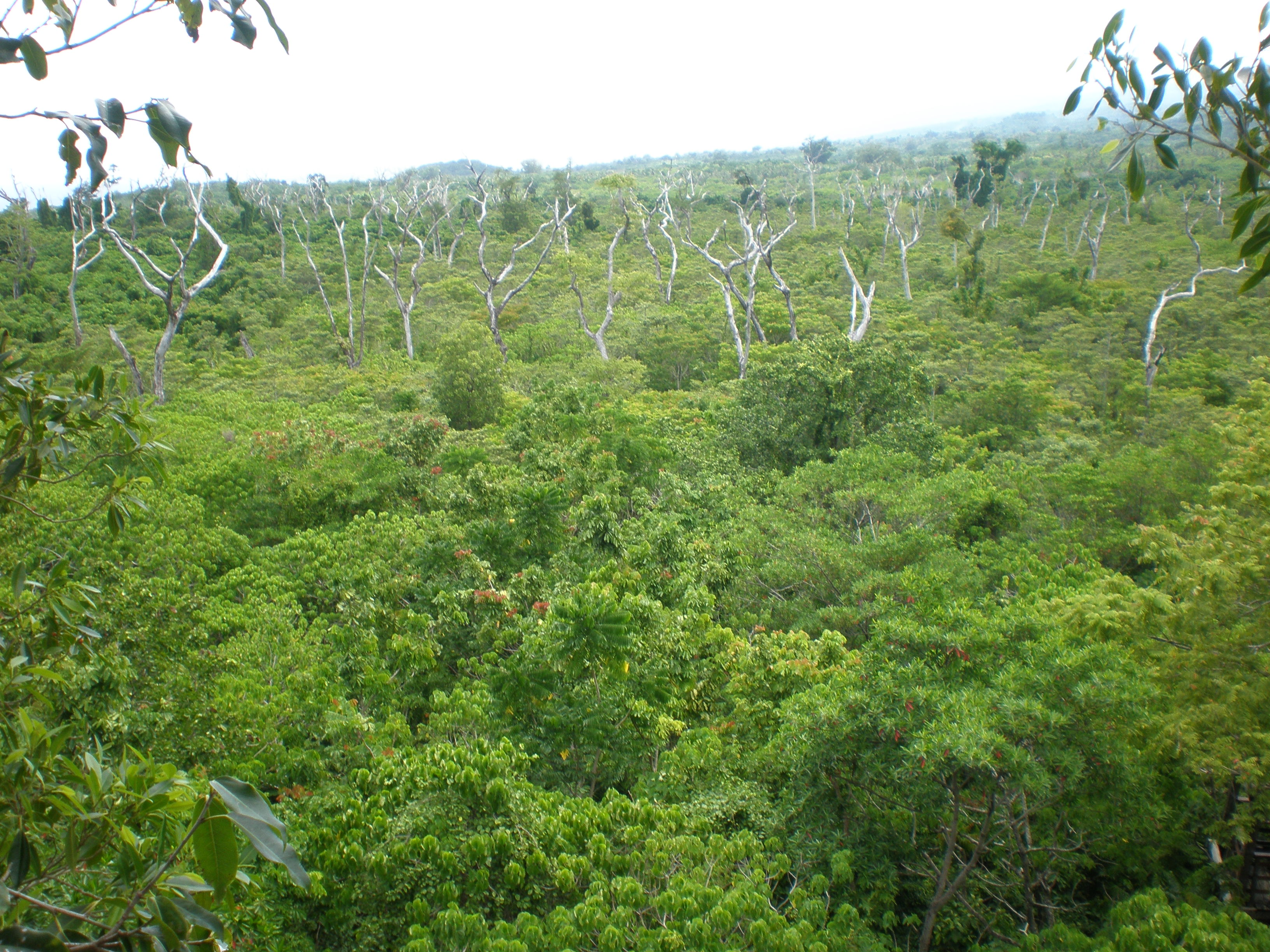
View over the Falealupo rainforest on Savaiʻi

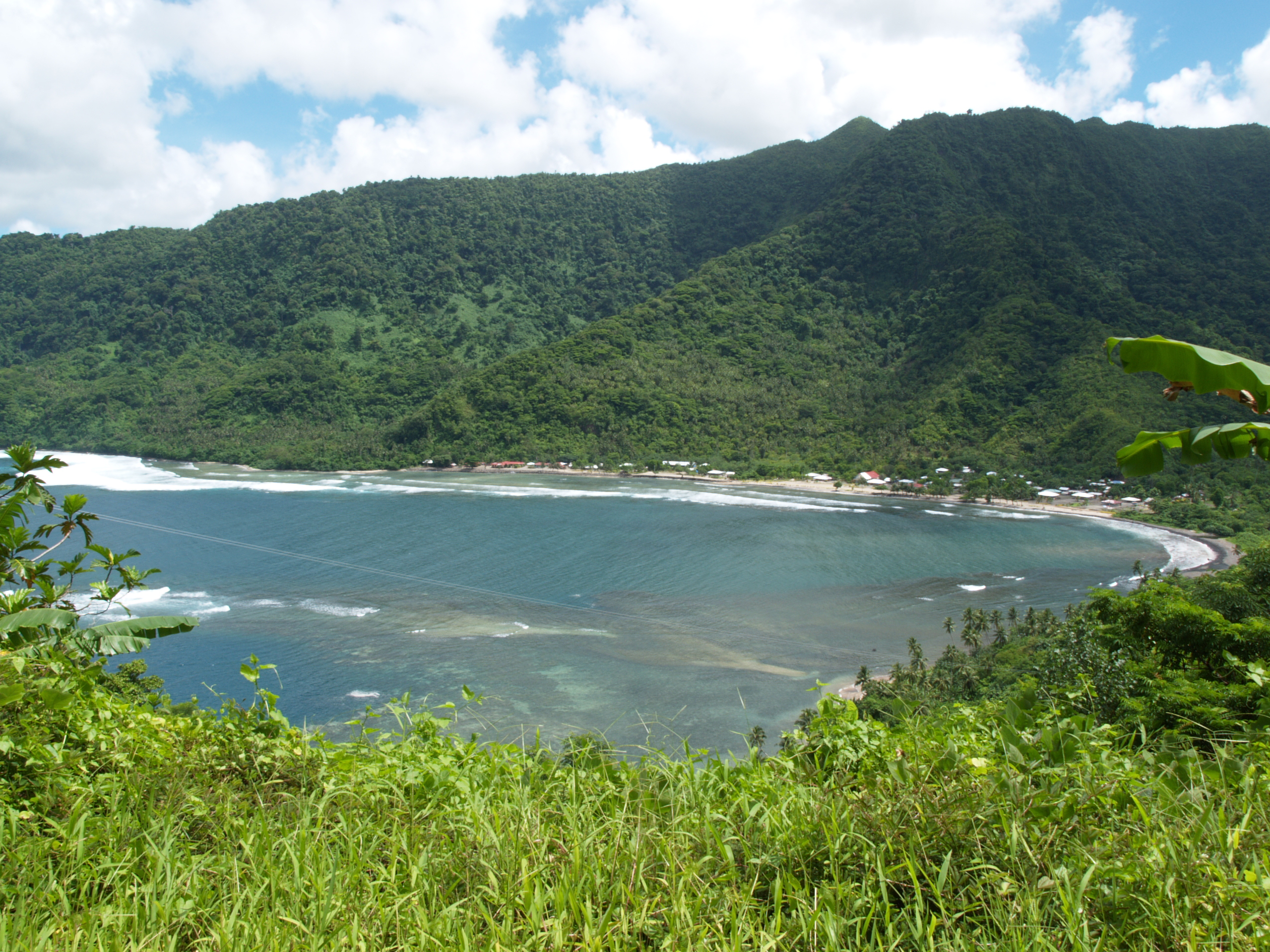
Uafato, associated with the Fagaloa Bay-Uafato-Tiʻavea coastal rainforest area

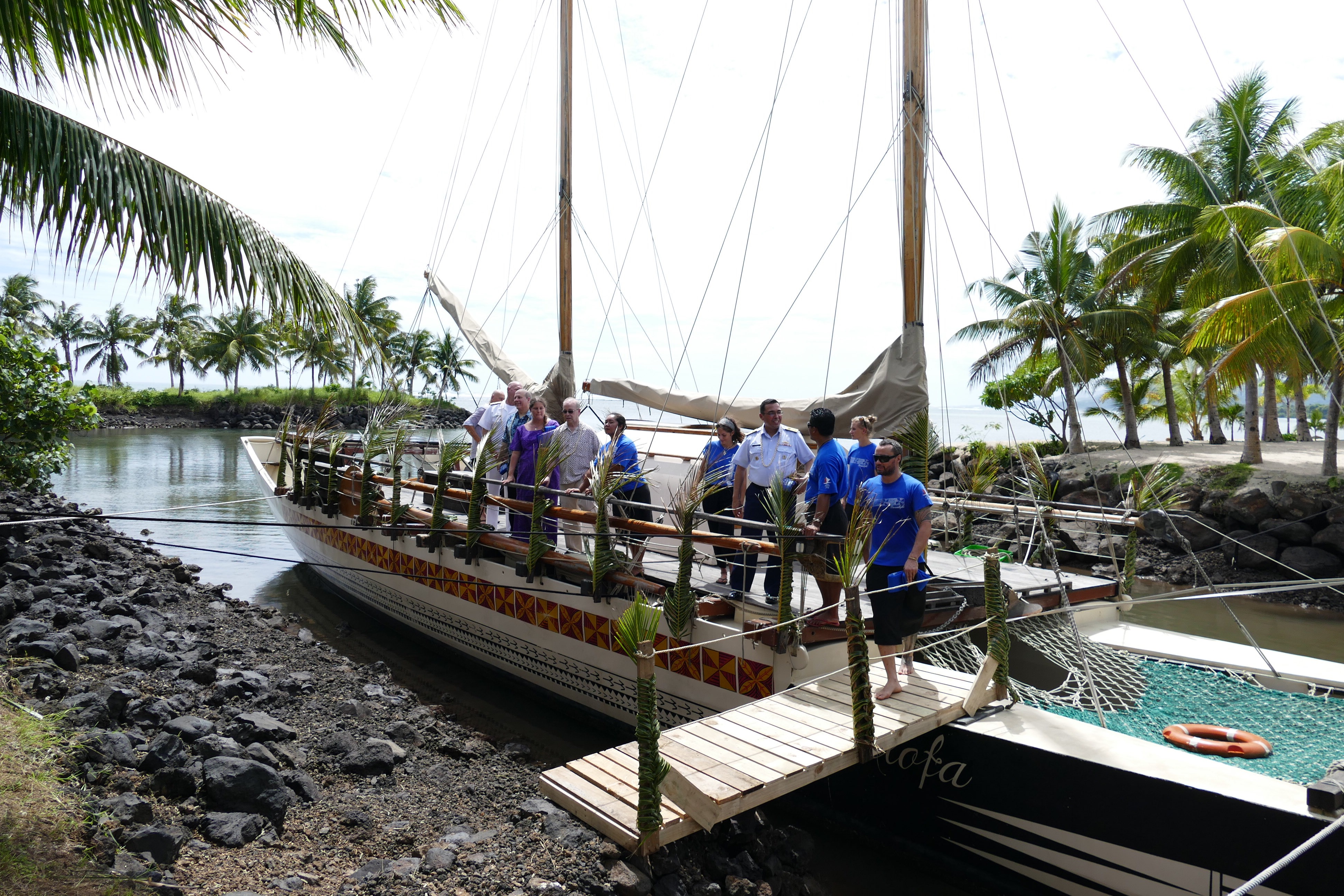
The voyaging canoe Gaualofa, later used in CI Samoa's Guardians environmental education programme

== Partnerships ==
Recurring government and institutional partners have included the Ministry of Natural Resources and Environment in ocean strategy and marine spatial planning, the Ministry of Agriculture and Fisheries in ocean governance and fisheries-related work, and the Ministry of Education and Culture in the Guardians environmental education programme. International and technical partners in Samoa's ocean-planning work have included the European Union, the IUCN, the Waitt Foundation, the Waitt Institute, and the Blue Prosperity Coalition.

Community, civil-society, and donor partners have included the Samoa Voyaging Society in environmental education and awareness work, the Samoa Umbrella for Non-Governmental Organisations in consultation and outreach, and groups such as the Youth Climate Action Network and Samoa Conservation Society in the Guardians programme. Support for these activities has included Samoa's Civil Society Support Program, UNESCO's Japanese Fund in Trust education programme, and New Zealand's Manaaki Fund.

== Funding and conservation finance ==
Funding associated with Conservation International Samoa's work sits within Samoa's broader ocean-financing framework. The Samoa Ocean Strategy 2020-2030 made ocean financial sustainability one of its integrated management solutions and set staged goals for defining implementation costs, preparing a business plan, establishing legal and institutional arrangements for ocean finance, and putting identified financing mechanisms in place by 2030. Samoa's wider ocean-policy framework has operated in a context of limited fiscal space, dependence on remittances and official development assistance, and difficulty attracting private investment, making external technical and financial support important to implementation.

Ocean planning and marine spatial planning linked to the programme have been supported through a mix of development assistance, technical support, and partner-backed implementation. The marine spatial planning process was supported by funding from the European Union's Global Climate Change Alliance Initiative and technical assistance from the IUCN Oceania Regional Office. After the 2020 launch of the ocean strategy, the Samoa partnership with Conservation International and the Blue Prosperity Coalition was framed as providing funding, technical assistance, and implementation support for ocean management and blue-economy planning. More broadly, Samoa received about US$21 million a year in ocean-economy official development assistance between 2010 and 2020, more than 15% of its total ODA, although those flows were volatile and concentrated in a small number of large projects.

Financial and economic analysis has also been used to support Samoa's marine planning. A marine ecosystem service valuation carried out as part of the broader MSP project assessed seven marine and coastal ecosystem services to inform equitable management decisions and support national marine spatial planning. It estimated that coastal and marine and climate-related projects accounted for 28.6% of total donor cash grants in 2019, worth about SAT$65.8 million or US$24.8 million, and treated marine research, education, and management as a significant component of external investment. That valuation was also used to support analysis of trade-offs in ocean use and to improve Samoa's access to funding and financing for implementation of the marine spatial plan.

The wider financing agenda connected to the ocean strategy has also included discussion of possible future mechanisms rather than only currently implemented funding streams. Options identified for medium- to long-term use have included sustainable tourism levies, blue bonds, Payment for ecosystem services, Blue carbon, and insurance schemes, although these were presented as future possibilities rather than established CI Samoa financing instruments. A separate donor-funded stream has supported education and resilience work: in 2022, the Manaaki Fund backed a partnership involving Conservation International Samoa, Conservation International Aotearoa, and the Samoa Voyaging Society to continue the Guardians programme in Samoa and to begin planning similar delivery in Tokelau.

== Impact and evaluation ==
By 2023, Samoa's ocean-governance framework had developed a strong policy basis and broad legitimacy through extensive consultations, but important implementation gaps remained. The Samoa Ocean Strategy 2020-2030 was regarded as a coherent foundation for ocean governance and as well placed to address Samoa's climate and environmental pressures, yet stronger integration with other sector strategies, clearer monitoring and evaluation responsibilities, and more detailed costing were still needed. The monitoring and evaluation role assigned to the National Ocean Steering Committee had not been fully specified, and pandemic-related disruption meant that several foundational objectives and milestones had already slipped behind their original timetable.

For land-based conservation themes that overlap with the programme's forestry and biodiversity work, a 2016 mid-term review of the Strengthening Multi-sectoral Management of Critical Landscapes project recorded a mixed picture. By midterm, biodiversity pre-surveys in four key biodiversity areas, rapid biodiversity assessments in three, GIS base mapping, and policy-review work had been completed or were underway. At the same time, progress towards reforestation, degraded-land restoration, and household-income targets remained limited; Outcome 1 was rated moderately unsatisfactory, and most of its intended results were judged highly unlikely to be achieved within the project timeframe. Project implementation and adaptive management overall was rated moderately satisfactory, but the review also identified missing monitoring protocols, underestimated monitoring resources, and weak communication of early warnings to the project board.
