= Colette Pichon Battle =

American climate activist and lawyer

Colette Pichon Battle is an American lawyer and climate justice organizer. Her work focuses on creating spaces for frontline communities to gather and advance climate crisis strategies that help us steward the water, energy, and land. She is a TED speaker, a 2019 Obama Foundation Fellow, and is the recipient of the 2023 Heinz Award for the Environment, the 2022 Catalyst Award from Rachel’s Network, and the 2022 William O. Douglas Award.

Colette is the co-founder and Vision & Initiatives Partner for Taproot Earth and is a former corporate lawyer. Internationally, Colette has gained recognition for her outstanding use of the legal and judicial process to achieve environmental goals. After 17 years of work leading the development of programming focused on equitable climate resilience in the Gulf South by Gulf Coast Center for Law & Policy (GCCLP), in 2022, she expanded her vision into Taproot Earth, inspired by her learnings with GCCLP and movement partners across the South.

== Life ==
Battle was raised in Bayou Liberty, Bonfouca, Louisiana. She attended Kenyon College (class of 1997), from Slidell, majoring in international studies, and took a J.D. degree at Southern University Law Center in 2002.

She was chosen as an Echoing Green Climate Fellow in 2015, was recognised as a White House Champion of Change for Climate Equity in 2016, and received an Honorary Doctorate from Kenyon College in 2018. She was recognized as an Obama Fellow in 2019, for her work with climate change-affected Black and Native communities. She received the title of Margaret Burroughs Community Fellow in 2021.

In 2024, her insights were featured in the New York Times bestseller, What If We Get It Right? by Ayana Elizabeth Johnson, exploring possible climate futures.

== The Gulf Coast Center for Law & Policy ==
Battle oversaw the legal services in immigration and disaster law and created advocacy campaigns for the Gulf Coast Center for Law & Policy (GCCLP). After the 2005 Atlantic hurricane season, Moving Forward Gulf Coast, Inc. launched the GCCLP as a program. Residents in five states had to traverse legal and political procedures while dealing with tragedy and trauma, which had a long-term effect on their capacity to heal from the disaster and their human right to go home. Following the BP Oil Drilling Disaster, GCCLP added class action legal counsel to its work in 2011. In its first year, it recovered more than $1 million in claims that had previously been denied to claimants.

As the organization's creator and co-executive director, Battle created programming with a focus on just disaster recovery, international migration, local economic growth, climate justice, and energy democracy. In 2022 the GCCLP became Taproot Earth.
