= Gaualofa =

Polynesian voyaging canoe

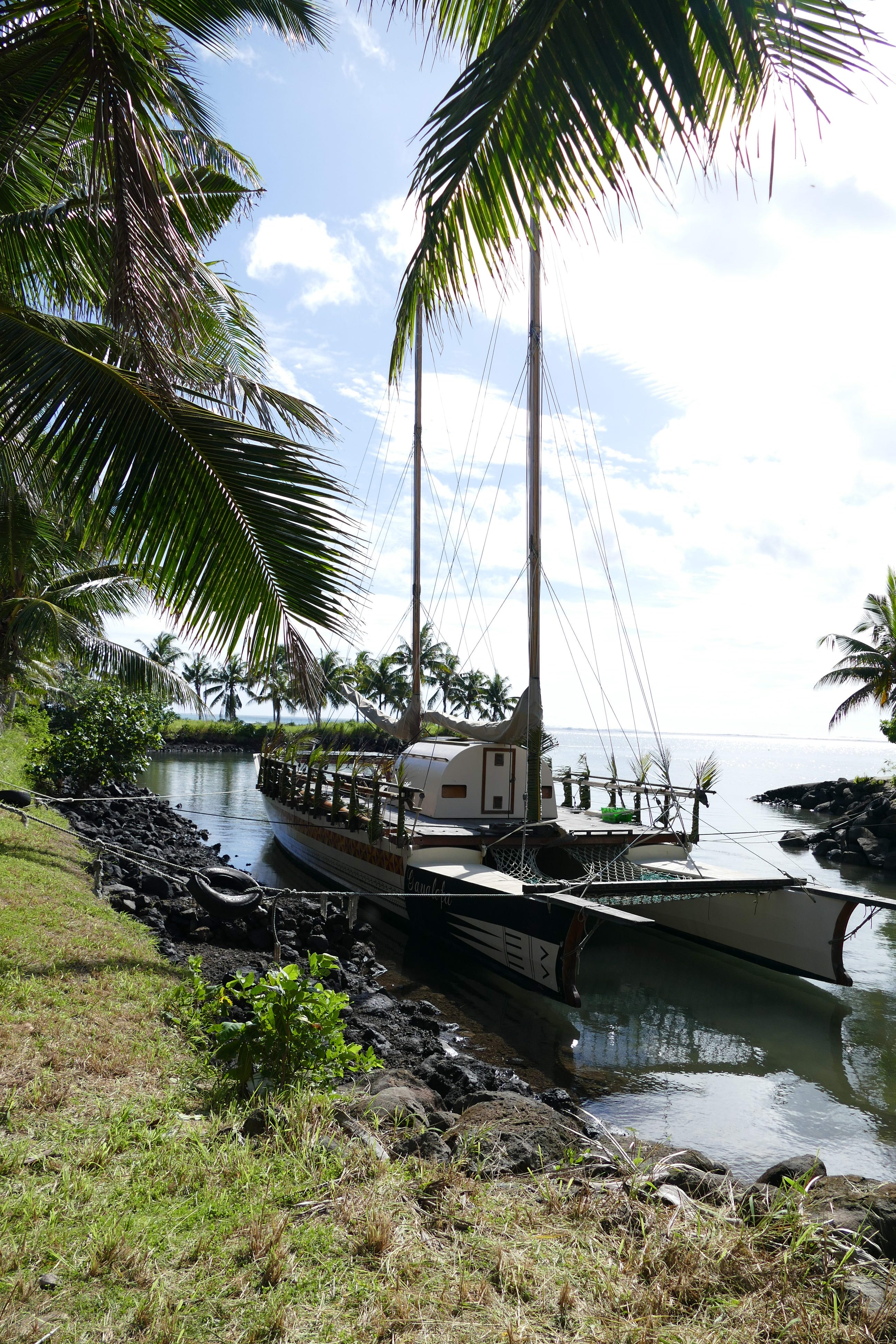
- The Gaualofa

History

Samoa
- Name: Gaualofa
- Owner: Samoa Voyaging Society
- Builder: Salthouse Boatbuilders
- Launched: 2009
- Identification: MMSI number: 518387000; Callsign: 5WGK
- Status: Active

General characteristics
- Class & type: Vaka Moana
- Tonnage: 13 tonnes
- Length: 72 ft (22 m) overall
- Beam: 21 ft (6.4 m)
- Draft: 6 ft (1.8 m)
- Propulsion: Sail / PV electric
- Sail plan: crabclaw sails
- Complement: 14-16

Gaualofa is a reconstruction of a va'a-tele ("large canoe"), a double-hulled Polynesian voyaging canoe. It was built in 2009 by the Okeanos Foundation for the Sea. It was given to the Samoa Voyaging Society in 2012, on the occasion of Samoa's 50th anniversary of independence. It is used to teach polynesian navigation.

== Construction ==
Gaualofa is one of eight vaka moana built for the Okeanos Foundation for the Sea and gifted to Pacific voyaging societies. The vaka hulls are constructed of fiberglass, The wood beams are connected to the hulls with traditional lashings. The two masts are rigged with crab claw sails, with bermuda rigged sails for safety during long voyages. It is fitted with a 1 kW photovoltaic array powering a 4 kW electric motor. It was constructed at Salthouse Boatbuilders in Auckland, New Zealand.

== Voyages ==
- In 2010 it served as an environmental ambassador for the Pacific Regional Environment Programme and Coral Reef Initiative for the South Pacific, visiting French Polynesia, the Cook Islands, Samoa and Tokelau.
- In March 2011 it visited New Zealand before journeying to Hawaii.
- In 2011 it visited San Diego as part of a fleet of six traditional canoes which voyaged across the Pacific to the USA.
- In 2011 - 2012 it was part of the Te Mana o Te Moana (Spirit of the Ocean) fleet which visited 15 Pacific nations to spread knowledge of voyaging culture and advocate for ocean conservation.
- In 2014 it journeyed to Sydney, Australia as part of a fleet to mark the IUCN World Parks Congress.
- In 2017 it visited Samoa's coastal communities as part of a conservation outreach program.
- In 2018 it journeyed to New Zealand for a festival of Māori and Pacific navigation, during which it sailed around the country. It attended Waitangi Day celebrations in the Bay of Islands, a climate change conference, and the New Zealand Festival of the Arts in Wellington. It returned to Samoa in May.
- In 2020 it voyaged around Upolu while engaging in environmental education work.
- In January 2021 it was dry-docked for maintenance. It was refloated again in August 2021.
- In 2022, the canoe was used as a platform for Guardians-linked environmental education through the Manaaki project run with the Samoa Voyaging Society and Conservation International Samoa.

== Images ==
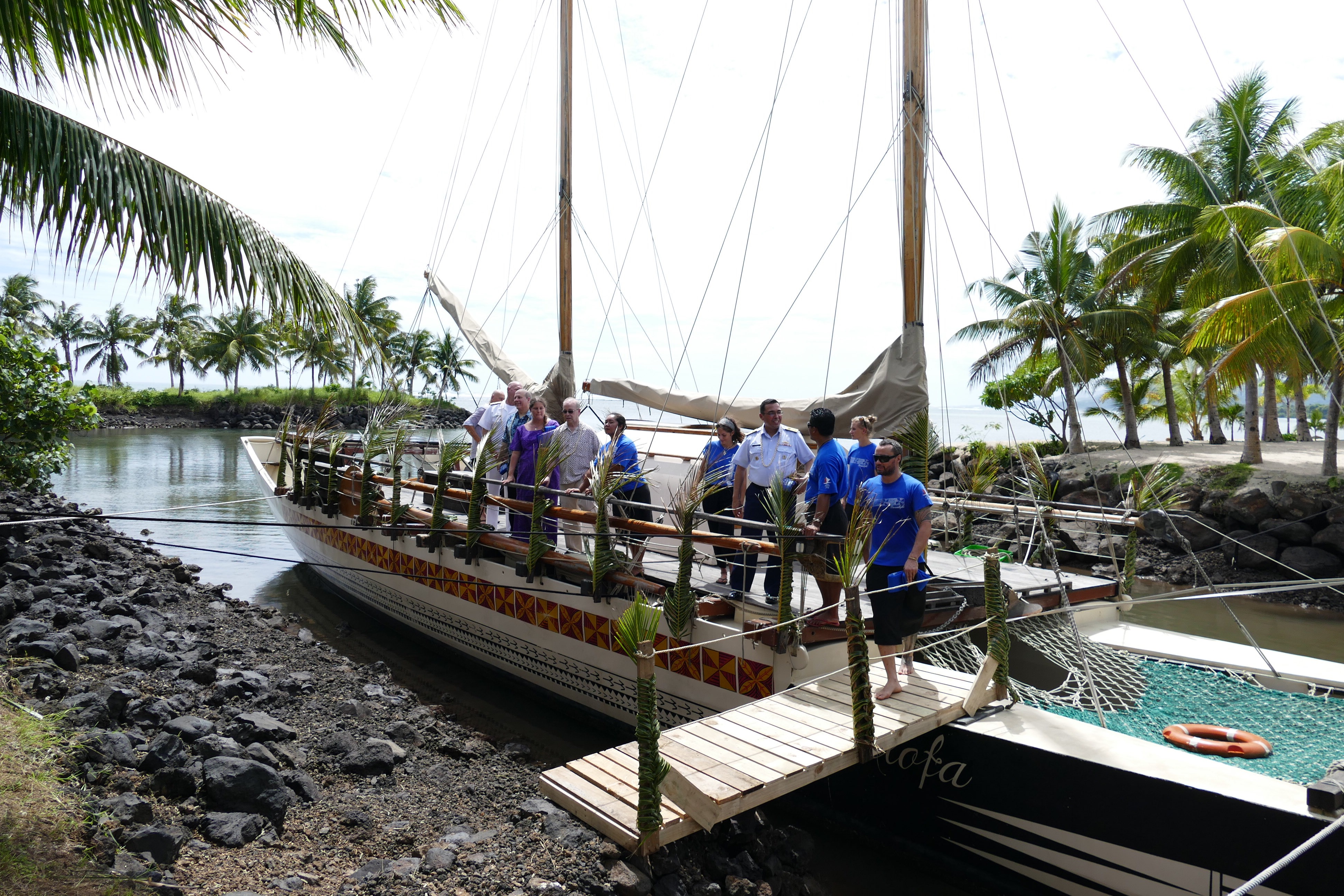
Gaualofa in 2016

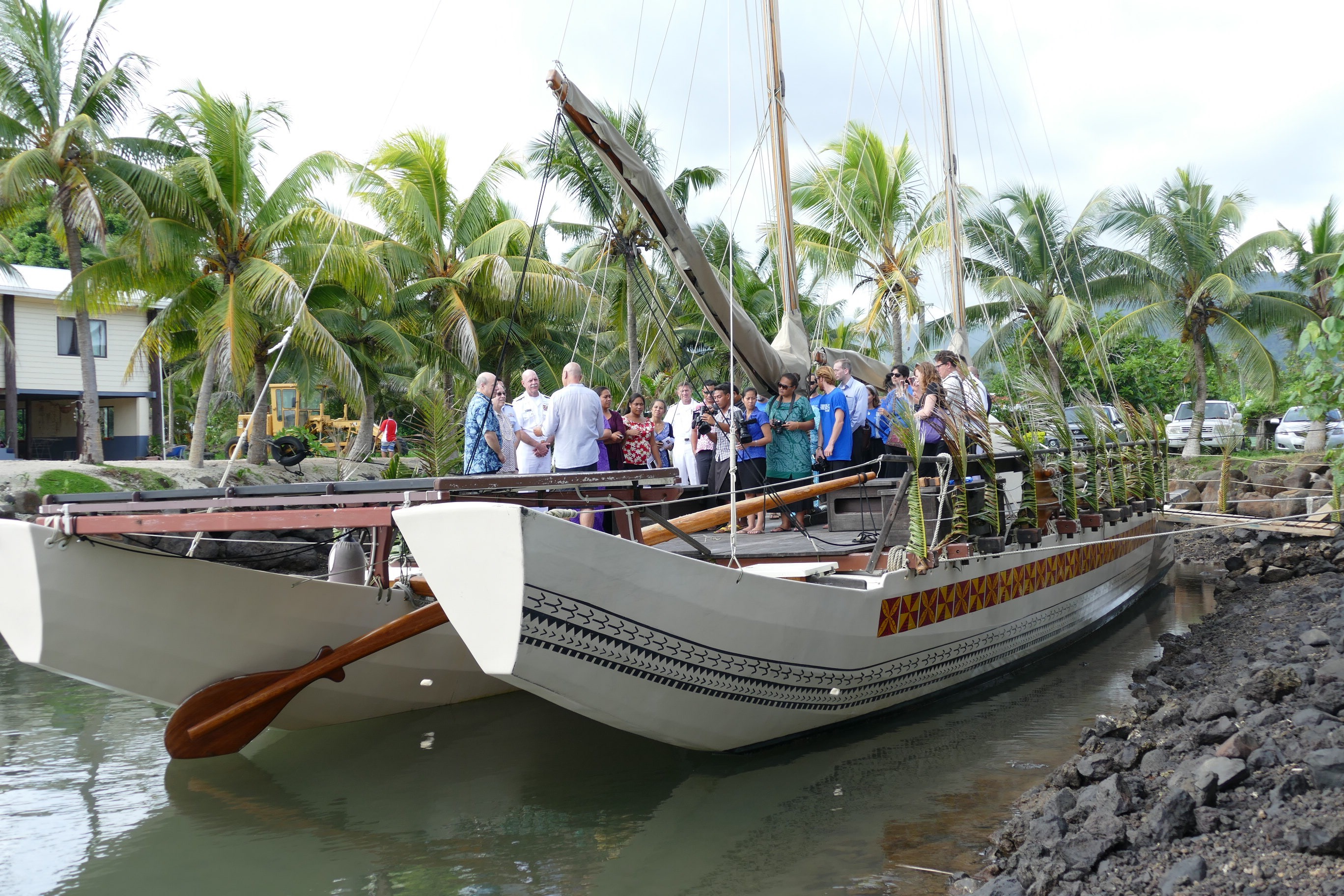
Ceremony aboard va'aka Gaualofa in 2016

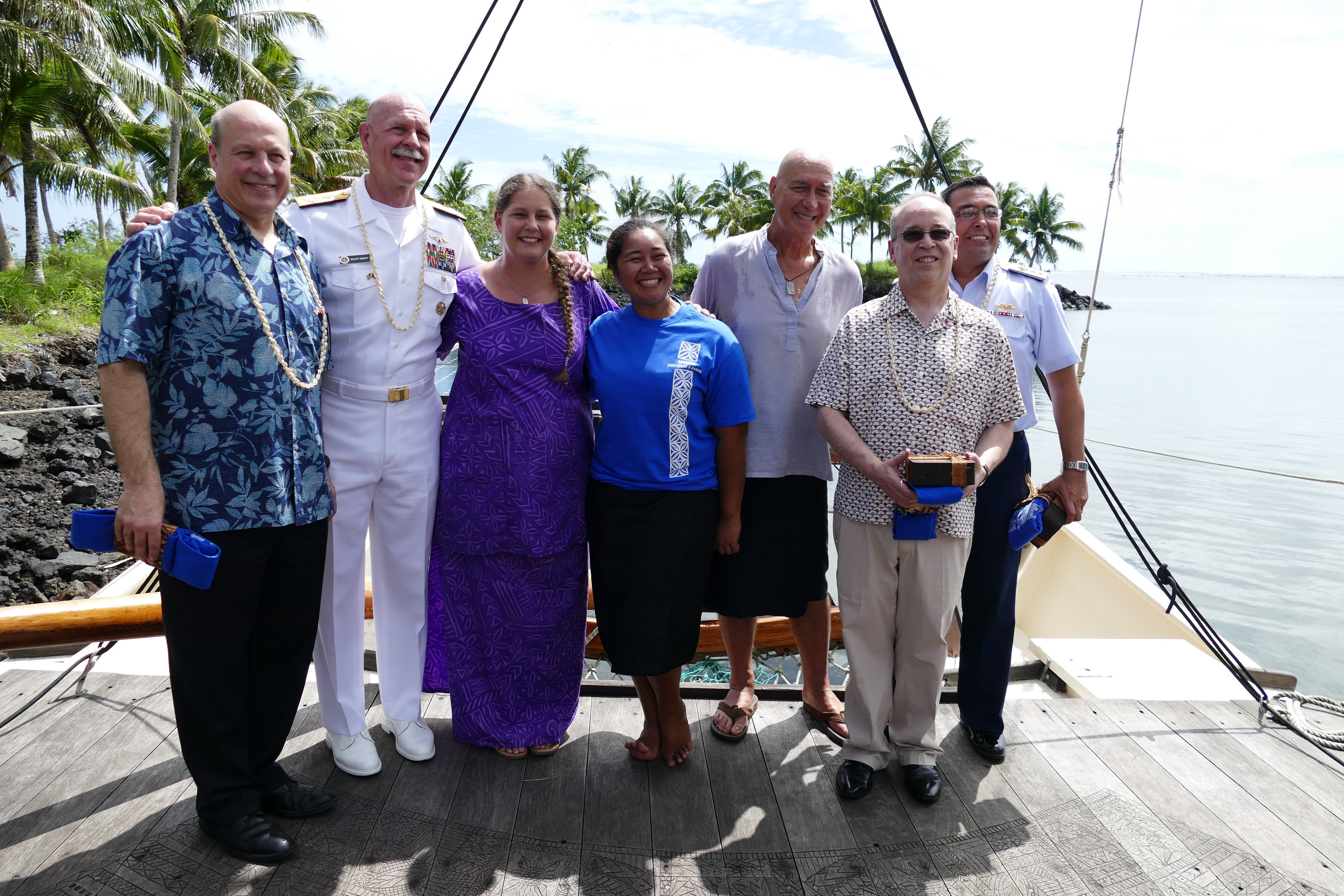
Dignitaries with Captain Fealofani Bruun

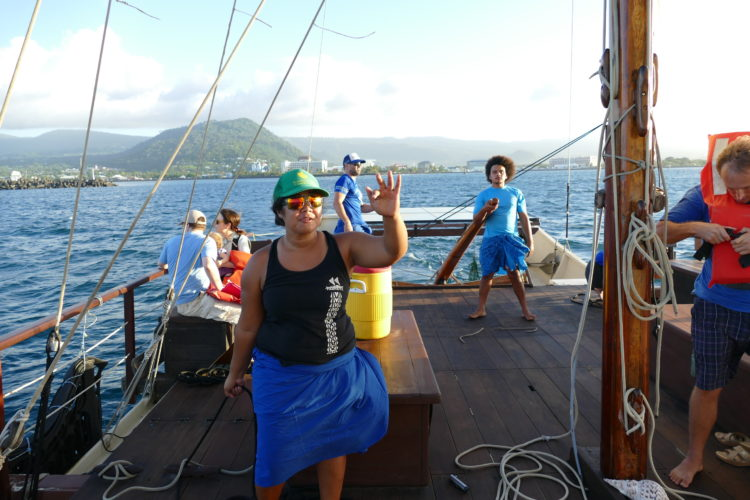
Fealofani Bruun on the Gaualofa
