= Abigail Dillen =

American attorney and climate activist

Abigail Dillen is an environmental lawyer and executive at the environmental justice organization Earthjustice. Her work has been called "precedent setting" by multiple climate organizations. This includes, for example, defending the roadless rule. She was profiled as a 2020 changemaker by Marie Claire.

Dillen has a Juris Doctor degree from UC Berkeley School of Law, BA from Yale University and joined in Earthjustice in 2000. She led both the clean energy and coal programs at Earthjustice. She became the chief executive in 2018 replacing Trip Van Noppen.

Dillen was a contributor in the All We Can Save anthology. She has also published opinion pieces for USA Today, Huffington Post, The Hill, EcoWatch and other news sources.

== Personal life ==
Dillen grew up in New Mexico. She is married to architect Jasmit Rangr, and has a son.
