= Va'a-tele =

Traditional Samoan double canoes

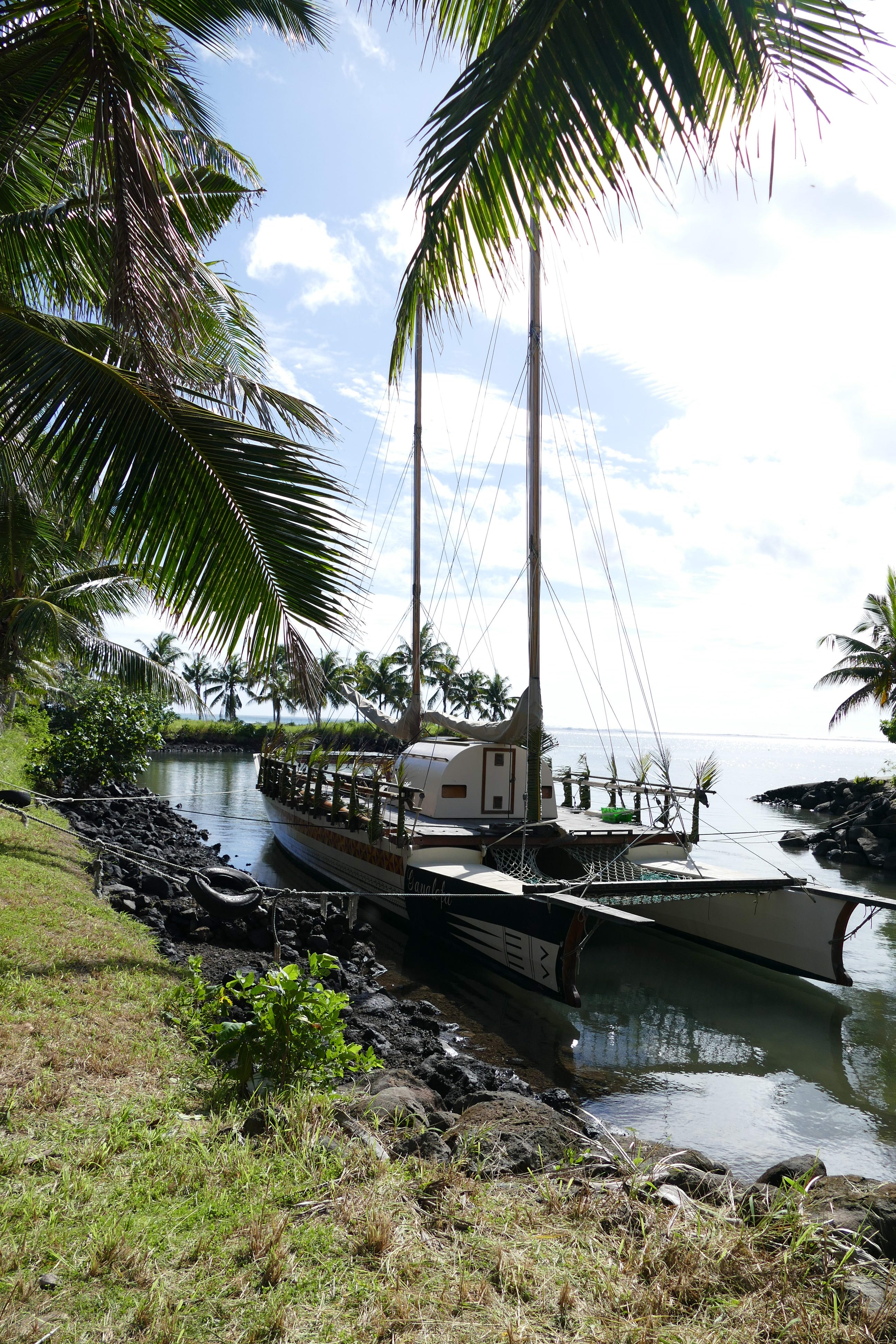
The Gaualofa

Va'a-tele are large, traditional Samoan double canoe multihull watercraft.

== See also ==
- va'a
