= Fealofani Bruun =

Samoan sailor

On the Gaualofa

Fealofani Bruun (born 1983) is a sailor who was the first Samoan woman to qualify as a yachtmaster. She sails and captains the Gaualofa – a double-hull canoe which was built by the Okeanos Foundation for the Sea for the Samoa Voyaging Society (Aiga Folau o Samoa) to preserve the traditions of Polynesian navigation. In 2018, she was listed as one of BBC's 100 Women.
