= 500 Women Scientists =

Non-profit advocating for gender equality in science

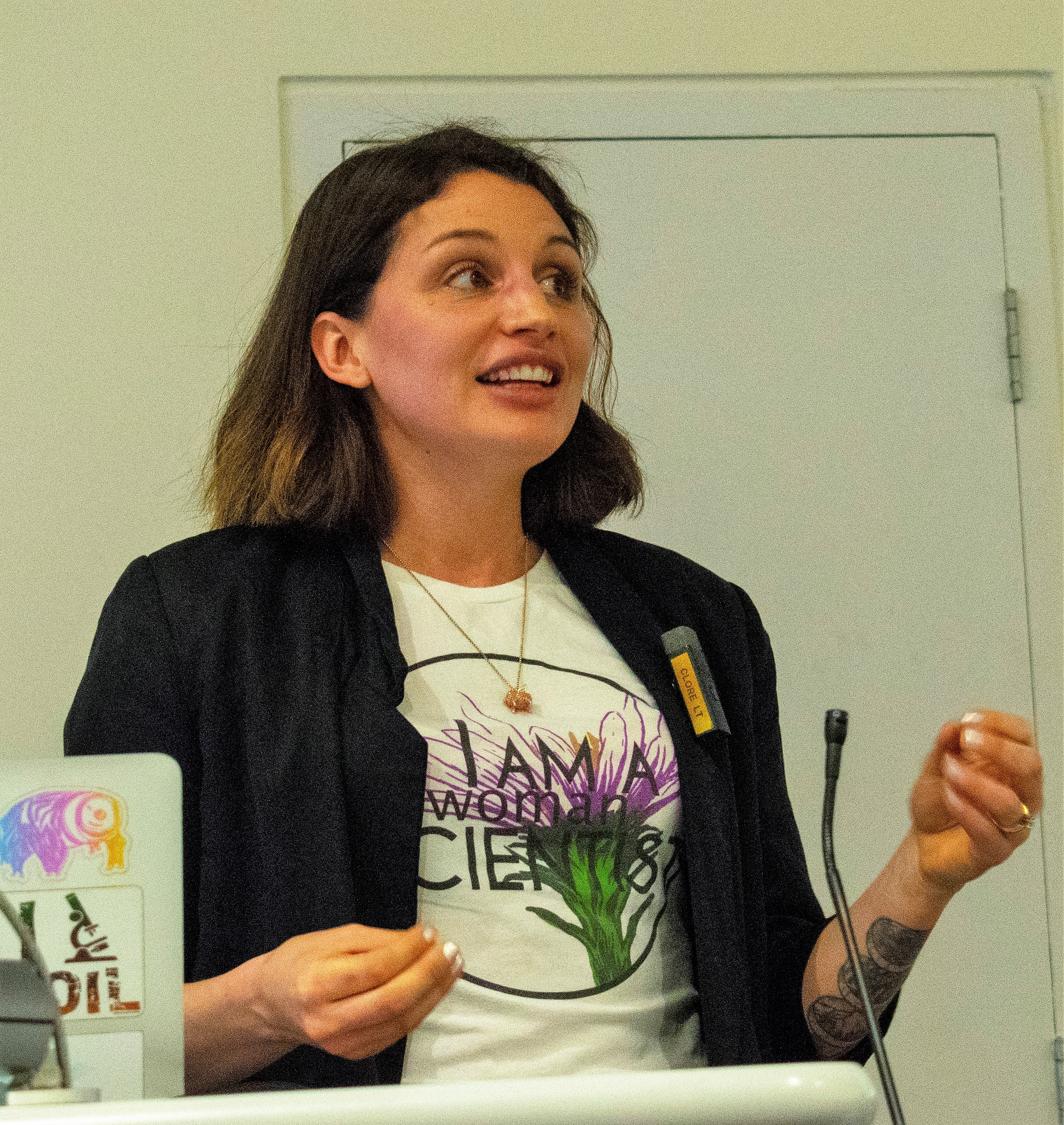
- Co-founder Kelly Ramirez-Donders wearing organization logo at Imperial College London in 2019
- Formation: November 2016
- Founder: Kelly Ramirez and Jane Zelikova
- Type: Nonprofit organization
- Legal status: 501(c)3
- Website: http://500womenscientists.org

500 Women Scientists is a non-profit group dedicated to making science open, inclusive, and accessible. To achieve this mission, they work to increase scientific literacy through public engagement, advocate for science and equity, and provide self-identifying women with the tools and support they need to reach their full potential. The organization began with an open letter in November 2016 and was officially recognized as a 501(c)3 in May 2018.

== History ==
500 Women Scientists launched with an open letter signed by 500 women scientists after the United States 2016 presidential election. The letter pledged to speak out not only against policies that go against scientific evidence, but also against inequality, sexism, xenophobia, and other forms of discrimination against marginalized communities. Within two months, the pledge received over fifteen thousand signatures from women and allies in 109 countries.

In concert with the 2017 Women's March, women scientists and supporters who signed the pledge organized themselves into groups to march together. The local marches became the basis for forming local chapters, or "Pods", where local women scientists meet regularly. Pods function both as a support system and as a vehicle to focus on and organize around issues that resonate in their own communities, in line with 500 Women Scientists core mission and values.

In 2023, due to issues with funding, the organization was forced to scale back operations, including ending a fellowship and letting go of paid staff. Some organizers within the project blamed an unstable grant funding environment that led to the reduction of the organization.

== Programs and initiatives ==
=== Request a Woman Scientist ===
To increase representation of women on conference panels and in high-profile science journalism stories, 500 Women Scientists launched a Request a Woman Scientist database for self-identifying women with expertise in STEMM (science, technology, engineering, mathematics, and medicine) fields. The database currently contains over 6,000 women in 104 countries.

=== Sci Mom Journey ===
500 Women Scientists launched the Sci Mom Journey campaign to share the journeys of parents in science, specifically mothers, who face institutional challenges when it comes to issues such as accessible lactation rooms and parental leave.

=== Fellowship for the Future ===
In 2019, 500 Women Scientists launched the Fellowship for the Future program to recognize and support women of color who are leading initiatives in the STEM community that work towards promoting equity, inclusiveness, and accessibility in STEM in line with the organization's mission. In 2023, the organization was forced to end their fellowship due to budgetary constraints.

=== Public engagement ===
500 Women Scientists often uses science writing as a means of communicating their expertise and values to the public at large, with pieces featured in outlets like Science, Scientific American, and The Seattle Times. The global leadership team has authored a number of opinion pieces on topics as varied as calling for evidence-based policy-making at the Environmental Protection Agency, recommending policy reforms to combat sexual harassment in academia, and encouraging journal editors to think carefully about fostering equity and inclusion in their editorial pages. Local Pods have also written about issues facing their own communities, ranging from the effect of President Trump's border wall on California wildlife to the need to stop burning coal in the Puget Sound.

== See also ==
- 500 Queer Scientists
- #IfThenSheCan
- Timeline of women in science
- Women in STEM fields
