= Earth Optimism =

Environment protection movement

Earth Optimism is a movement promoting a positive outlook towards problems related to environmental or climate issues. Earth Optimism provides an alternative narrative to mainstream environmental news by highlighting the potential for humans to positively impact the environment by making small changes at individual and community levels. It focuses on positive technological advances and ecological success stories to illustrate the potential for hope in the face of environmental challenges.

Due to occurrences such as habitat loss, the increasing number of endangered species and the rapid escalation of climate change, there tends to be a negative outlook towards the impacts of human on the Earth. The Earth Optimism approach seeks to minimize defeatist mindsets concerning the environment and has become an increasingly popular strategy that many individuals employ in order to slow and reverse negative anthropogenic impacts on the Earth.

== Overview ==
In 2017 Nancy Knowlton founded the Earth Optimism movement in an attempt to highlight the success of large- and small-scale actions taken to better the Earth. The Earth Optimism Summit is a result of the promotion of Earth Optimism and has taken place annually since 2017. The Earth Optimism movement encourages environmentally beneficial actions by giving people a reason to hope for positive environmental developments. Through examples of success stories, the movement aims to convince people that positive environmental progress is attainable. The goal of Earth Optimism is to promote people to be supportive and enthusiastic towards environmental restoration and climate change relief programs.

== Agencies, organizations, and individuals advancing Earth Optimism ==
The mission of the Smithsonian Conservation Commons is to apply "the Smithsonian's cultural and scientific expertise to achieve outcomes truly consequential to sustaining Earth's biodiversity and ecosystems". The mechanism of the Smithsonian CC's success is this organization's ability to create and engage an interdisciplinary network of experts that are mobilized to take action and affect change in everyday environmental problems. The Smithsonian Conservation Commons focuses on four major areas of sustainability: Earth Optimism, a movement to change the conservation conversation, finding opportunity in environmental problems; Movement of Life, a field that researches and communicates wide-scale movements of species and ecosystems; Sustainable Food systems, an area focusing on real-life practices that cultivate sustainable and accessible food options while preserving natural resources; and Working Land and Sea Scapes, which focuses on researching and implementing sustainable practices in cultivated lands, both terrestrial and aquatic.

The Cambridge Conservation Initiative (CCI) is a unique collaboration between the University of Cambridge and leading internationally focused biodiversity conservation organisations based in and around Cambridge, UK. Together, the CCI partners represent an unparalleled source of knowledge and experience about biodiversity conservation, with projects in over 180 countries and over 250 years of combined experience. Cambridge, UK, is the hub of the largest cluster of conservation organisations in the world. CCI is located in a Conservation Campus in the David Attenborough Building – where leaders in academia, business, government and non-governmental organisations can interact and work together.

== Influential individuals ==
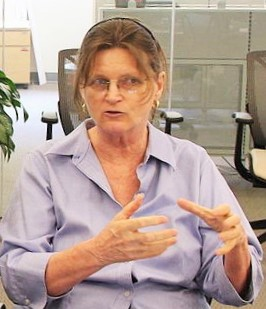
Nancy Knowlton on World Oceans Day 2015

Nancy Knowlton: Dr. Nancy Knowlton is the Sant Chair for Marine Science at the Smithsonian as well as a coral reef biologist and author, credited with notable works such as her book Citizens of the Sea. In Citizens of the Sea, Knowlton discusses the Census of Marine Life, which was a global effort to explain the biodiversity present in the world's oceans. In 2014 she took part in launching #OceanOptimism, a facet of Earth Optimism on social media in order to encourage positive efforts towards marine conservation. The success of #OceanOptimism lead to Knowlton becoming Co-chair for the Smithsonian Conservation Commons' Earth Optimism summit in 2017.

Ruth Anna Stolk: Ruth Anna Stolk has developed and hosted hundreds of discussions to change peoples’ attitudes to conservation. She is currently a Smithsonian Research Associate, focused on US Conservation in the early 1900s and was recently awarded a Bell Research Grant by the Forest History Society at Duke University. Stolk is currently working on a book, “Citizens of the Trees,” set to publish in 2025. She serves on the Board of Directors of the Forest History Society and the Endangered Species Coalition and is a member of the African People and Wildlife (APW) International Advisory Council.

In addition to her research, she also led the elite team at the Smithsonian that coordinated the Earth Optimism (EO) Summits from 2017-2022. In partnership with EO co-founder Nancy Knowlton, Stolk also formed an Earth Optimism Alliance with dozens of global Institutions, including Cambridge Conservation Initiative, National Museums of Kenya, Taronga Zoo in Sydney, Australia, and more. In 2020, EO reached over 400 million people around the world and was the main theme for the Smithsonian Folklife Festival in 2022.

Andrew Balmford: Andrew Balmford is Professor of Conservation Science in the Department of Zoology at the University of Cambridge. His research focuses on the costs and benefits of conservation, how to best reconcile conservation and farming and examining what works in conservation. He is the author of ‘Wild Hope: On the Front Lines of Conservation Success’ (2012). Andrew currently runs the Student Conference on Conservation Science with Rhys Green, Rosie Trevelyan and Ed Turner. After Nancy Knowlton's 2016 presentation at the Student Conference on Conservation Science, he and Rosie Trevelyan co-convened the 2017 Cambridge Earth Optimism Summit.

Rosie Trevelyan: Dr. Rosie Trevelyan is the Director of the Tropical Biology Association (TBA), an NGO that is building the capacity of conservation professionals from around the world. The TBA has offices in Cambridge and Nairobi, with over 2,500 alumni who have taken part in the TBA's field courses and specialist programmes. Rosie is a co-organiser of the Student Conference on Conservation Science and is a trustee of the Durrell Wildlife Conservation Trust, the SE Asia Research Programme and is a council member of the Cambridge Conservation Initiative. She co-founded the Cambridge Conservation Forum in 1998 and 2017 Cambridge Earth Optimism Summit with Andrew Balmford.

Steve Monfort: Steve Monfort is the former Director of the Smithsonian National Zoo and Conservation Biology Institute. Monfort is one of the co-founders of the Smithsonian-Mason School of Conservation, which puts George Mason University students in an interdisciplinary, conservation-focused learning environment. Monfort is also the Co-founder and board chair of the Sahara Conservation Fund. Monfort is involved in many other conservation groups and organizations. He has published over 100 scientific papers addressing the discipline of reproductive biology. He has helped to pioneer non-invasive endocrine monitoring techniques currently being used to assess and evaluate the reproductive status and well-being of wildlife in zoos.

Tom Lovejoy: Tom Lovejoy served as the chairperson for the first Earth Optimism Advisory Group in 2017. He was a leading figure in the work of both climate change and biodiversity conservation movements. His successful tenure in biology and conservation began in the early 1960s when he developed the idea to conduct long-term studies on the effects of forest fragmentation in the Amazon rainforest. This idea eventually developed into the largest experiment in landscape ecology called the Minimum Critical Size of Ecosystems project (also known as the Biological Dynamics of Forest Fragments Project). Starting in 1982, Lovejoy served as an advisor for the new PBS television series Nature, a documentary series exploring global wildlife topics. He is recognized as founding the field of study known as Climate Change Biology, and helped to popularize the widely used term "biological diversity".

Anson Hines: Anson Hines is the director of the Smithsonian Environmental Research Center (SERC) in Maryland where he oversees all the researchers, technicians and students conducting research in ecological studies. His leadership in the research department at the Smithsonian has significantly influenced Earth Optimism by helping people in the non-science world easily understand the complexity of what is happening in our ecosystems.

Dr. Sarah Jaquette Ray: Dr. Ray is an author and teacher of environmental studies at Humboldt State University. In her book, "A Field Guide To Climate Anxiety", she reflects on many strategies and views that align with the Earth Optimism movement. Although she may not be directly aligned with the movement, this work truly reflects the core values of the movement. Dr. Sarah Ray suggests an orientation towards climate advocacy that avoids some of the pitfalls "caused by a superficial attachment to hope". Instead of a "utilitarian hope", the Dr. Ray suggests a "critical hope" that does not rely on immediate results of the impact to be felt, but rather orients people towards action on even the smallest of scales.

The author poses the question... what is better than hope? Proposing that empowerment to work toward a way of being in which one can yearn for is much more sustainable and effective in the long term. Desire is much more effective in being a positive motivator for individuals to take action than blind hope is. Dr. Ray also says in her book "We are of no use to the cause if we are burned out by apocalyptic fatigue or so overwhelmed by fear, shame, and sadness that we simply opt out to save ourselves from pain". Adding that it is important to "recalibrate ourselves to the small and local" in order to avoid such climate anxiety and actually be effective in action, rather than being paralyzed in inaction.

== Examples in popular culture ==
=== The Earth Optimism Summit ===
Earth Optimism was brought into the public's eye by the Smithsonian and the Cambridge Conservation Initiative at their first annual Earth Optimism Summit in 2017. The summit's focus was to change the perception of conservation from that of doom and gloom to optimism and opportunity. Speakers from around the world convened to share stories of hope and examples of success in the field of conservation. A variety of interests are represented at the summits, ranging from branches of the government such as the United States Forest Service, to non-governmental organizations, including the World Wildlife Foundation. Similar events have developed across the country, each promoting instances of success in the field of conservation. The 2020 Summit looks to promote and focus on youth involvement in recent climate action along with a gallery of exhibits showcasing impactfull projects at small and large scales.

World leading conservationists, including Sir David Attenborough, Jane Goodall and Steven Pinker, gathered in Cambridge to celebrate #EarthOptimism on April 22, 2017. The 2017 Earth Optimism Cambridge was hosted by the Cambridge Conservation Initiative (CCI), the unique collaboration between the University of Cambridge and leading internationally focused biodiversity conservation organisations clustered in and around Cambridge, UK. The event hosted talks from a wide range of world-renowned conservationists and thought leaders, it also included a Solutions Fair – open to the public – where visitors could find out how their behaviour and choices as consumers can have the biggest positive effect for the natural world and for a sustainable future.

== Earth Optimism's merit in influential and motivational behavior ==
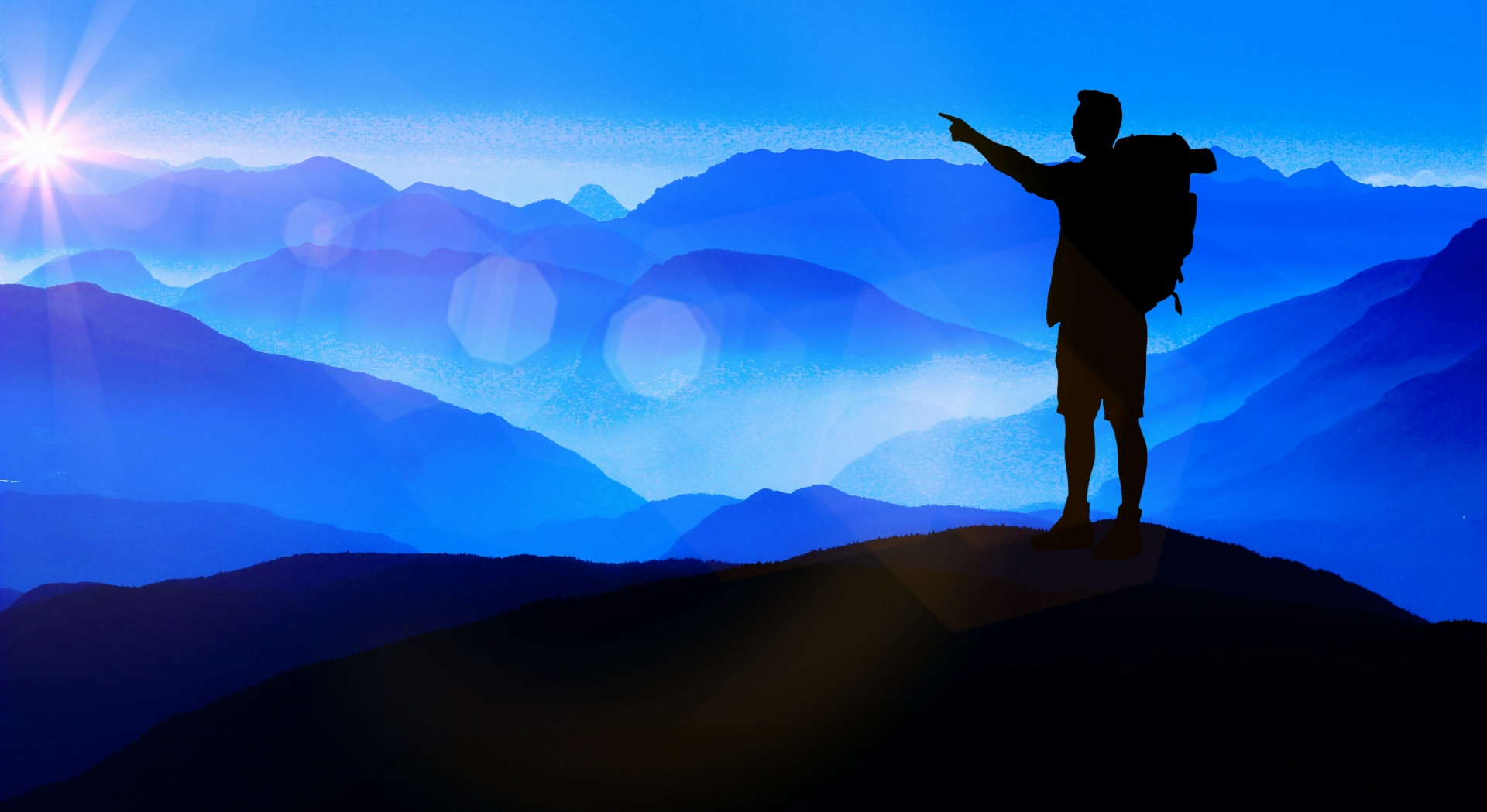
Climbing mountains can be symbolic of achieving goals. What motivates a person to climb a mountain may be similar to what motivates a person to contribute to an environmental movement.

Earth Optimism is a mechanism for creating environmental change. Pressing issues, such as climate change, have placed environmental issues in the forefront of media. Although education and understanding of environmental issues has increased, many feel as though their individual actions are powerless to affect change in large-scale problems. Personal efficacy, the idea that the actions of an individual can be effective in implementing change, is overlooked as a tool for addressing environmental problems. It is instead important for environmental involvement to be viewed as achievable through a collective group, thus encouraging collective efficacy. Many environmental goals have proven too lofty to accomplish on an individual scale, further reinforcing that effective methods must include contributions from communities.

Disseminating information that highlights environmental successes can motivate people to implement environmental changes. It has been proven that when presented large-scale problems with no clear solution, people tend to feel defeated and demonstrate lackadaisical attitudes. When people are exposed to successful environmental progress, they may be encouraged to contribute further. The promise, or at least the possibility, of what can be done is very influential in gaining support. For example, in some public health ad campaigns, when individuals viewed smoking cessation ads with information and resources on how to quit, they were more likely to change their habits and actions.

Exposure to social norms can be a primary source in influencing people's actions. There are two types of social norms that are documented: descriptive and prescriptive social norms. Prescriptive social norms dictate societal expectations in terms of actions and behaviors, while descriptive social norms come from personal comparison to how others are acting. Oftentimes, the latter has a much stronger influence on how people and communities act. Seeing others perform actions which are both positive and influential is a powerful tool in encouraging collective efficacy and influencing individuals to actually come together to take action.

As an example of this principle, some studies have shown that people are more likely to believe in climate change if their peers share this belief. Dr. Phillip Ehret of California State University San Marcos makes note of the extreme influence on individuals by their peers. If people knew that climate change was more commonly believed among their peers, they would be more likely to believe in it themselves. Therefore, simple things such as ad campaigns or more access to accurate information regarding climate change can make a big difference in gaining support for the environmental movement. Exposure to such messages can influence things such as motivation. Understanding the power of optimism and the reasons for motivation can be especially important in utilizing Earth Optimism as an instrumental part of promoting community togetherness.

The practice of using optimism as a tool to attain a goal is not a new idea. In sports, mental tools such as positive-self talk and goal setting have been used to aid in athlete achievement and success. The theory is based on Charles Carver and Michael Scheier's principle that human nature is to work towards or avoid different mental goals. According to Suzanne Segerstrom and Lise Solberg Nes, the probability of working towards and achieving a goal can be increased through the application of optimism as a mental tool for influencing behavior.

Motivation drives people to alter their behavior in order to achieve a goal. Motivation styles differ, however, altering the effect of optimism across individuals. Avoidance motivation, or behavior influenced by avoiding failure and potential negative outcomes, is one driver to achieve goals. Those who are motivated by avoidance may oppose conservation efforts, believing the conservation movement will not succeed and their efforts will be wasted (concerns about personal efficacy). The Earth Optimism movement aims to decrease the perceived threat of failure through success stories, therefore reducing a psychological barrier to goal attainment (environmental conservation) created by avoidance motivation. By providing a picture of success, optimism alleviates fear of failure, allowing avoidance motivated individuals to strive to provide greater support to the conservation movement.

Individuals process mental strategies differently, and Earth Optimism can also have less successful effects on conservation efforts. Those who are approach-motivated, or find motivation in working towards the successful completion of a goal, may be influenced differently by success stories. An overoptimistic viewpoint may result in decreased goal attainment. This is due to underestimation of risks as a result of focusing solely on the end goal or persisting in unattainable endeavors for too long rather than taking a new approach. Opponents of Earth Optimism argue that encouraging more optimism is not always the best solution for some individuals and could potentially hurt the conservation movement.

Motivational science supports arguments for and against using a generalized optimistic outlook for the conservation movement. Carver and Scheier hypothesize that avoidance motivation has a stronger effect on human nature than approach motivation due to evolutionary tactics. This bodes well for the Earth Optimism movement, as it suggests avoidance motivation, on which optimism has a greater effect, has more drive behind our behaviors than approach motivation. Therefore, Earth Optimism can be used to motivate more people by playing to the stronger motivator: avoiding failure.

== Earth Optimism and Traditional Ecological Knowledge (TEK) ==
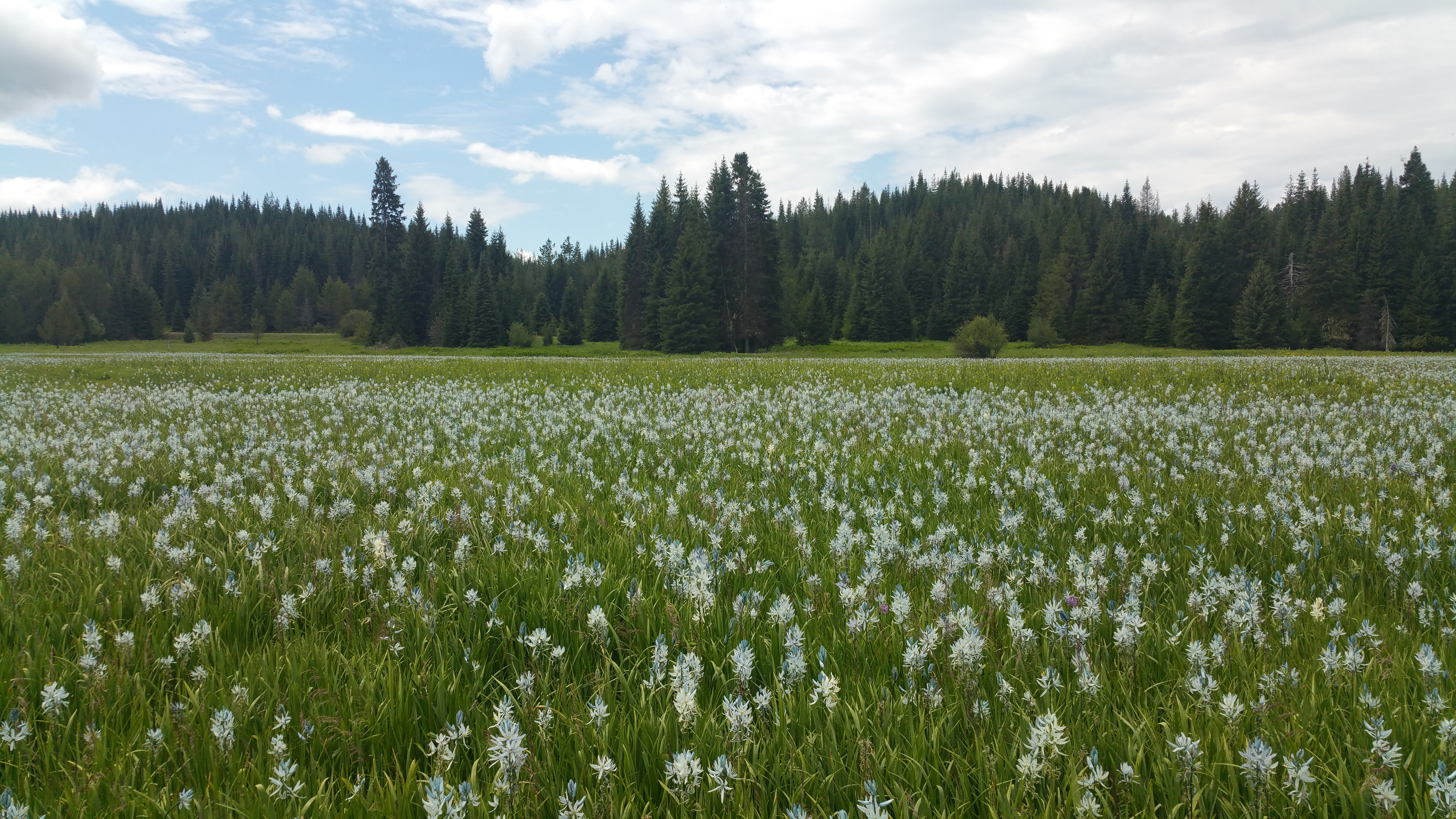
Blooming camas (Camassia quamash) in Musselshell Meadow, a protected area in the Clearwater National Forest, Idaho, and an important gathering ground for the Nez Perce people.

Traditional ecological knowledge (TEK) is defined as the shared beliefs and cultural, place-based knowledge held by Indigenous peoples about how humans and living beings relate to the environment and to one another. Although TEK has been practiced for millennia, there has been a recent surge in interest in TEK, both as an area of study and as a means to inform conservation and natural resource management decision making. TEK can be used to inform research and management across a range of conservation interests, including biodiversity, threatened species, aquatic ecosystems, fire, invasive species, and climate change.

Because native people only make up about 4-5% of the world's population, it is easy to leave out or forget about their perspective. One of the most important messages from traditional and Indigenous people is their sense of equanimity and optimism. Incorporating Indigenous perspectives into the conversation, especially in environmental education programs, can help to improve the damaged relationship between Indigenous and non-Indigenous peoples.

Public figures that incorporate TEK and Indigenous Knowledge into Earth Optimism include:

• Winona LaDuke, an environmentalist, political activist and a member of the White Earth Nation, is well known for her commitment to sustainable development and working with Indigenous communities. She states that TEK represents the clearest empirically based system for resource management and ecosystem protection in North America She mentions that native societies' knowledge surpasses the scientific and social knowledge of the dominant society in its ability to provide information and a management style for environmental planning.

• Chief James Allan, the Vice-Chairman of the Coeur d'Alene Tribe in Idaho, is another important public figure working to strengthen environmental and educational programs in his tribe.

• Steven Martin, Director of the McNair Program at the University of Idaho and a member of the Muscogee Creek Nation, works with undergraduate students, teaching them about the importance of incorporating Indigenous Knowledge and TEK into research and decolonizing the western education system.

• Autumn Peltier, 15-year old Indigenous climate activist and member of the Wiikwemkoong First Nation. Her efforts as an advocate for clean water have inspired many people to get involved with her community and speak up against pipeline projects and to address the issue of the lack of clean water for many Indigenous communities.

TEK has also been incorporated into school curricula in the form of culturally significant figures and ideas in education. Presenting environmental science in a way that is understandable to those used to a more traditional ecological reference such as TEK also respects and legitimizes the value of indigenous perspectives. Incorporating TEK into environmental optimism has the same effect as incorporating it into environmental science and education programs.

One goal of Earth Optimism is to show what is working in conservation so that successes can be scaled up and replicated. The integration of TEK into western-science based projects is an example of one such conservation approach that is working.

One frequently cited and well-documented example of successful integration of TEK with a western science-based approach to managing ecosystems comes from northern Australia. For several decades, ecosystem managers in the Kakadu National Park have collaborated with Aboriginal groups to successfully reintegrate traditional burning practices in an effort to lessen the size, severity, and negative effects of late-season wildfires. Not only has this ongoing effort helped park managers achieve objectives, but it has also improved interethnic relationships and relationships between park officials and local Aboriginal people.

The lessons learned and best-practices developed from reintegrating traditional burning practices in northern Australia could be exported and scaled appropriately to help meet fire and natural resource management goals in other similarly fire-prone areas. For example, areas in the western and southeastern United States that in pre-colonial times were characterized by frequent burning by Indigenous peoples but are now dominated by notably different, and arguably more destructive, fire regimes could benefit from the integration of TEK-based burning practices.

Federal agency oversight of oil and gas development in the Outer Continental Shelf (OCS) of Alaska provides another example of successful integration of TEK into modern ecosystem management. The U.S. Department of the Interior Bureau of Ocean Energy Management (BOEM) is the federal agency responsible for approval of OCS development projects. BOEM recognizes that traditional knowledge and scientific knowledge are complementary systems, despite using different methodologies that ask different questions, and that using both provides a better understanding of what is occurring in an ecosystem or region. BOEM policy seeks to integrate TEK into multiple areas of OCS decision making, including designing, planning, and conducting scientific research; applying data from both TEK and western science knowledge systems at the earliest opportunity in the process; using traditional knowledge in environmental analysis and mitigation; consulting with Indigenous leaders; and applying traditional knowledge at a programmatic decision level. This commitment to TEK integration has been a success in helping to mitigate potential conflicts between resource development activities and traditional subsistence activities like fishing, hunting, and whaling on Alaska's North Slope and could serve as a broad model for government agencies at the local, state, federal, and international level to incorporate TEK-based methodologies into resource development decision making processes.

== Criticism of Earth Optimism ==
Although Earth Optimism is a relatively new concept in the field of Environmental philosophy, a number of arguments against the movement have been proposed.

The "blissful ignorance" argument suggests that conservationists have to be careful not to be ignorant to the wide-scale environmental problems present across the globe. From this, critics argue that by focusing solely on positive news, an objective perspective of the broad issue is lost and therefore people can be swayed to think that issues will be solved without actually changing behaviors.

Another argument suggests that the balance between "combating conservation despair" and "avoiding the perverse outcome of breeding self-deceit and naive optimism" needs to be considered. This is also emphasized in a review on Steven Pinker's optimism; his argument is summarized simply by stating, "We need to face up to these and other daunting challenges while nurturing the positivity required to tackle them". This argument essentially states that we need to find a balance between acknowledging the challenges that we currently face and could potentially be facing in the near future, and being positive about the steps that we are taking forward as a society in order to fix the problems.

Nancy Knowlton, Sant Chair for Marine Science at the Smithsonian's National Museum of Natural History, has incorporated Earth Optimism into her work on coral reefs and has presented many lectures on the subject. Regarding Earth Optimism, she said," There are two arguments. One is that you'll make people apathetic because they'll think we're fine. The other is that you'll give evidence to the dark side, people who are against any kind of conservation anyway, they'll use your efforts to say we don't need to do anything. Every time we give a talk I would say somebody in the audience raises an issue more or less related to one of those arguments". The first argument she often hears relates to the argument of blissful ignorance in that only focusing on the positive can give people the wrong mindset of not needing to do anything. The second argument implies that people use the positive stories to negate the importance of conservation strategies.

== Interactions of Perspectives ==
=== Negative environmental portrayal ===
Social media influences many aspects of society and individual lives. Anyone can voice opinions online, regardless of fame or formal media attention. Individuals have the right to make their opinions known, regardless of the quality of content and supporting data. Social media is a continual online conversation that shapes thoughts and ideas about the environment and it can alter how the media portrays many issues, including climate change. Many organizations and individuals actively speak out against the validity of climate change to decrease public concern. Environmentalism is an issue they want to see minimized. This influence can greatly affect how the media reports information regarding these issues. One such large corporation seeking to influence the conversation is the ExxonMobil oil company. According to an article in The Guardian, ExxonMobil funded many lobby groups that published inaccurate and misleading information about climate change. One of the lobby groups, the Heritage Foundation, published a memo that read "Growing scientific evidence casts doubt on whether global warming constitutes a threat". It makes sense that an oil company would want the public to think there are no current environmental concerns; drilling for oil and burning it is not necessarily the best thing we could be doing for our planet. This type of propaganda defeats the purpose of Earth Optimism because it tries to convince people that there isn't a problem to deal with in the first place. ExxonMobil is not the only company, however, that is active in denying climate change. Since the 1950s, the Tobacco industry has been active in denying science to "counter the mounting evidence of the link between cigarettes and lung cancer." Conservative foundations such as The Heartland Institute and the George C. Marshall Institute have supported the fossil fuel industry, benefiting from the spread of doubts and misinformation regarding climate change. It has been found that these groups' strategies have ranged from writing editorials and commentaries in conservative media and blogs, editing reports, appearing on television, and even sometimes publishing in peer-reviewed articles. The fossil fuel industry and conservative groups and lobbyists are constantly on social media and the news openly denying climate change in order to sway the public's opinions. Doing so would encourage fewer people to be more environmentally conscious and thus remove the idea of Earth Optimism altogether.

=== Positive environmental portrayal ===
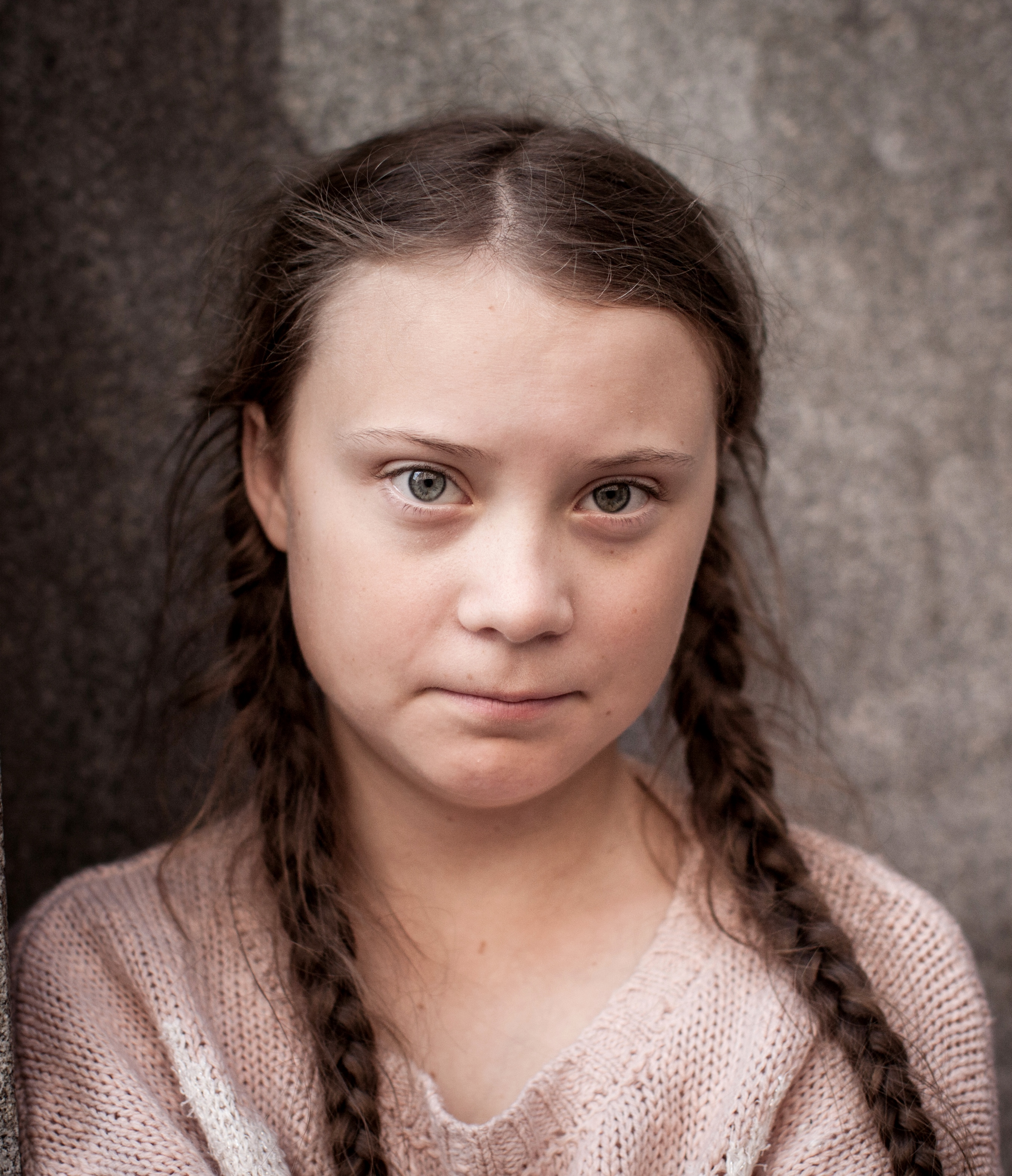
Greta Thunberg

The continual presence of unfiltered media conversations makes it difficult to discern factual research-driven information from biased agenda-driven content. It is hard to know whom to trust and which people or sites to choose from. Earth Optimism is really important in terms of climate change. Those who are Earth optimistic are usually pro climate change and believe we can change our actions to help the planet recover. Greta Thunberg starts off a speech by saying "My message is we're watching you" (Reuters). She is a really strong person in the media due to her age and attention, and whether you agree with her or not, she is receiving a lot of attention and is very important in the media for climate optimism. Much focus is put on her age; in her speech she talks about how her generation is the one that will be affected the most. Another climate change activist who is prominent in the media is Harry Potter actress Bonnie Wright. She works with lots of different companies and organizations to promote a plastic-free, sustainable lifestyle. This is important because she already has a large following and can reach a good section of a younger population, where it is more important.

=== Interactions among groups ===
The interactions between optimistic populations and negative-outlook populations is crucial to establishing relevant discussions, particularly in politics. Politicians, through establishing legislation, hold the most power to affect positive environmental change. Negative perspectives that remain unchallenged are unlikely to bring about productive action or legislation. For example, United States President Donald Trump is clashing with numerous environmental activists, scientists, and land management agency. This struggle between optimistic and pessimistic perspective affects the direction of environmental policy on multiple scales.
