= T. Jane Zelikova =

Ecosystem ecologist, filmmaker, and activist

- Т. Джейн Зелікова
- Born: March 24, 1978 (age 48); Ukraine
- Other name: Tamara Jane Zelikova
- Education: University of Georgia, B.A University of Colorado at Boulder, PhD
- Awards: Grist 50 2018 Fellow 2018 Science Media Awards, Summit in the Hub Fellow
- Scientific career
- Fields: ecosystem ecology, ecology
- Workplaces: University of Wyoming
- Academic advisors: Michael Breed, Nathan Sanders
- Website: http://www.janezelikova.com/

Tamara Jane Zelikova (Note: Ukrainian: Тамара Джейн Зелікова, romanized: Tamara Dzhein Zelikova) (born March 24, 1978) is a climate change scientist, advocate and communicator interested in the impacts of environmental change on natural and managed ecosystems. Her interests are broad and include tropical biogeochemistry, as well as the effects of climate change on organisms big and small. She combines a strong emphasis on research with an interest in science communication and outreach, thinking about ways to expand the role of science in tackling global issues.

Zelikova is the co-founder of 500 Women Scientists, a global grassroots organizing with the mission to make science open, inclusive, and accessible and to fight racism, patriarchy, and oppressive societal norms. She founded the organization after the 2016 United States presidential election, frustrated by what she saw as dismissive attitudes toward both science and women. She contributed to the collection of women writers about climate change All We Can Save.

== Early life and education ==
Tamara Jane Zelikova was born on March 24, 1978, to a Jewish family in Ukraine. Zelikova's family moved to Atlanta, Georgia in 1990, when she was 12 years old. She credits being an immigrant Jew as a significant part of her identity. She has previously said that she was an active child, and says that her curiosity about the way the world works was a factor in her interest in ecosystem science. Zelikova attended and graduated from the University of Georgia with a degree in ecology. She later received her PhD Ifrom University of Colorado Boulder in ecology and evolutionary biology.

== Career and research ==
Zelikova is an ecosystem scientist, filmmaker, and activist. She is a research scientist at the University of Wyoming. Her research primarily focuses on understanding the impacts of climate change on ecological systems, and studying the ways that both organisms, plants and biogeochemical cycles respond. Zelikova credits Michael Breed and Nathan Sanders as her mentors while at CU Boulder.

Zelikova's research examines how ecosystems are responding to change. Zelikova and her colleagues found that in a mixed grass prairie the plant community was more stable under increased carbon dioxide conditions. They also found more "evenness" in plant species. This is important because grassland prairie communities are valuable due to their plant community composition and amount of key forage species. and thus we need to understand how they respond to disturbance related climate change. In another study examining how invasive species respond to climate change, her and her team found that the invasive species growth was much more limited than they expected under warming conditions, mainly due to many features of climate change, including temperature, precipitation, soil texture, and plant demography, illustrating the interconnected nature of plant and animal responses to climate change. Another example of where her work focuses on these interactions includes her work in tropical lowland forests where she is examining the role of leafcutter ants to carbon dioxide and methane emissions, and how their nests change the landscape and in doing so, alter the processing of carbon, nitrogen, and phosphorus. More recently, Zelikova's research focuses on climate change mitigation, specifically how to promote greater carbon uptake in soil.

=== 500 Women Scientists ===
Zelikova is well known for co-founding 500 Women Scientists. Following President Trump's election in 2016 Zelikova and her colleague Kelly Ramirez formed 500 Women Scientists. They founded this after having concerns about women in STEM and the hateful rhetoric expressed in Trumps campaign, including sexism, disrespect, and attacks on minorities and immigrants. Globally, they have 165 pods that works together, and 111 in the United States.

=== End of Snow ===
Through a production company that she co-founded, "Hey Girl Productions" Zelikova released a film entitled End of Snow. End of Snow is a short film that follows a number of characters, including a paleoecologist, a rancher, and a man collecting snowfall data in the Southwest as they deal with the impacts of climate change. End of Snow won many awards, including the Best Editing award for an International Wildlife Film Festival, Vancouver International Mountain Film Festival Finalist 2018, and the Ekotopfilm Envirofilm 2017 award.

=== Activism and other ventures ===
Zelikova spent a year and a half working on policy in Washington, D.C., while she was an American Association for the Advancement of Science Fellow. She was working there when the Paris agreement was signed, however she left shortly into the Trump administration after becoming frustrated with the administrations stance on climate. Zelikova is also a co-founder of LUCA Media Collective, a non-profit media company that focuses on "supporting stories". Additionally, Zelikova developed a special course in Costa Rica on science communication that teaches students how to effectively communicate their research with policymakers and people in power.

== Awards ==
Zelikova has won numerous awards both for her activism and her contributions to science. She was awarded the Grist 50 2018 award. She is listed under their "strategist" section for co-founding 500 Women Scientists. Grist lists one of the most impressive parts of 500 Women Scientists as their "request a scientist feature", which connects journalists, policymakers, and others to top female scientists around the world. Zelikova was a Mendenhall fellow at the United States Geological Service from 2010 to 2012 and a AAAS Science and Technology Policy Fellow at the U.S. Department of Energy. She also won the 2018 Science Media Awards and Summit In the Hub fellow, for her innovative way of connecting science and media to tell stories, and promoting open, easy, science. Jane was recognized on the 2018 Bitch50 Bitch Media list for her work building the Request a Woman Scientist platform.
