= Kate Marvel =

American climate scientist and communicator

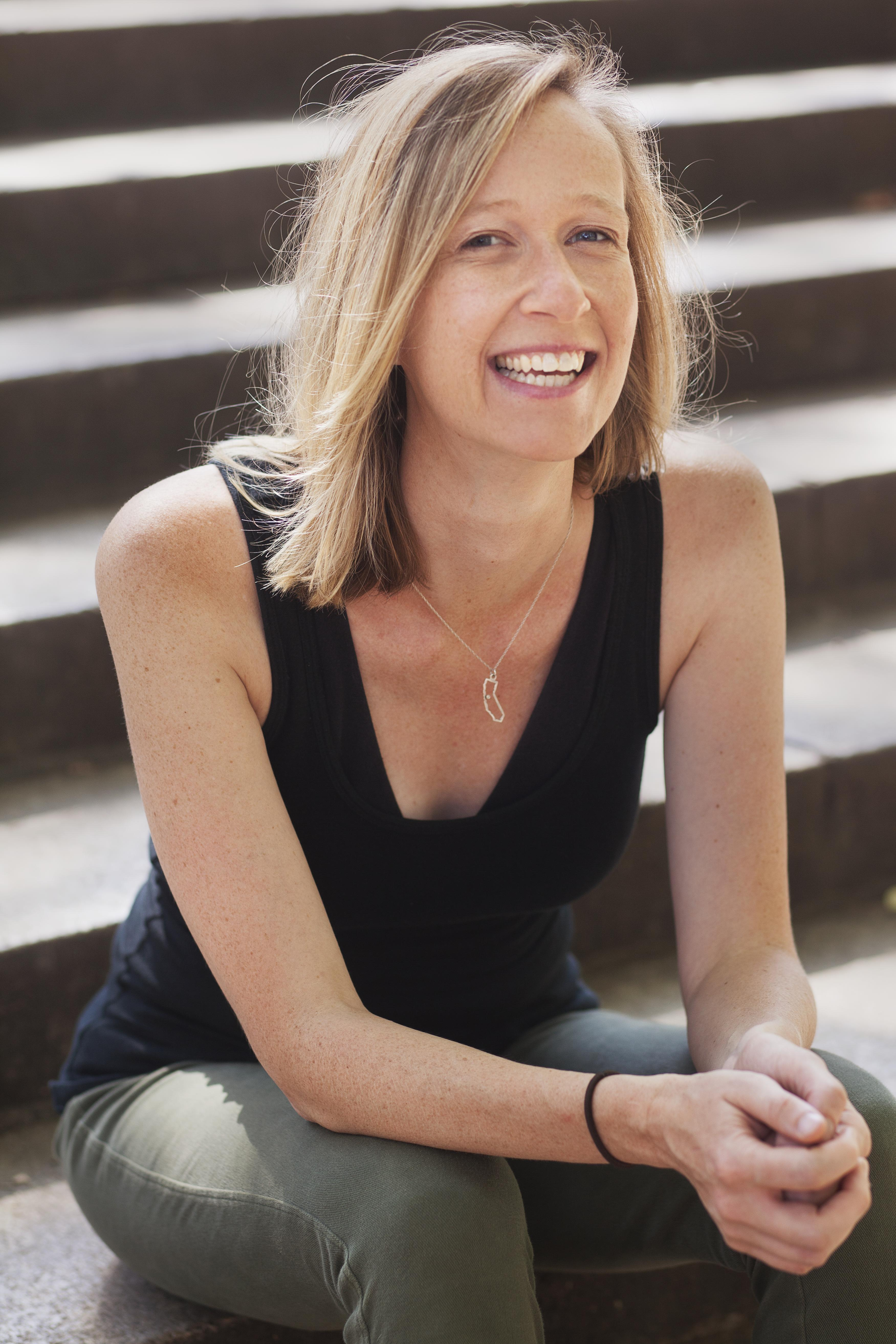
- Education: UC Berkeley (BA); Trinity College, Cambridge (PhD)
- Scientific career
- Fields: Climate science Climate modeling Science communication
- Workplaces: Columbia University, Goddard Institute for Space Studies, Lawrence Livermore National Laboratory, Carnegie Institution for Science
- Website: www.marvelclimate.com

Kate Marvel is a climate scientist and science writer based in New York City. She is a visiting scholar at New York University and was formerly an associate research physicist at the NASA Goddard Institute for Space Studies.

== Education and early career ==
Marvel attended the University of California at Berkeley, where she received her Bachelor of Arts degree in physics and astronomy in 2003. She received her PhD in 2008 in theoretical physics from University of Cambridge as a Gates Scholar and member of Trinity College. Following her PhD, she shifted her focus to climate science and energy as a Postdoctoral Science Fellow at the Center for International Security and Cooperation at Stanford University and at the Carnegie Institution for Science in the Department of Global Ecology. She continued that trajectory as a postdoctoral fellow at the Lawrence Livermore National Laboratory before joining the research faculty at NASA Goddard Institute for Space Studies and Columbia University in 2014. Marvel left the Goddard Institute at the end of 2022.

== Research ==
Marvel's current research centers on climate modeling to better predict how much the Earth's temperature will rise in the future. This work led Marvel to investigate the effects of cloud cover on modeling rising temperatures, which has proved an important variable in climate models. Clouds can play a double-edged role in mitigating or amplifying the rate of global warming. On one hand, clouds reflect solar energy back into space, serving to cool the planet; on the other, clouds can trap the planet's heat and radiate back onto Earth's surface. While computer models have difficulty simulating the changing patterns of cloud cover, improved satellite data can begin to fill in the gaps.

Marvel has also documented shifting patterns of soil moisture from samples taken around the world, combining them with computer models and archives of tree rings, to model the effects of greenhouse gas production on patterns of global drought. In this study, which was published in the journal Nature in May 2019, Marvel and her colleagues were able to distinguish the contribution of humans from the effects of natural variation of weather and climate. They found three distinct phases of drought in the data: a clear human fingerprint on levels of drought in the first half of the 20th century, followed by a decrease in drought from 1950 to 1975, followed by a final rise in levels of drought in the 1980s and beyond. The mid-century decrease in drought correlated with the rise in aerosol emissions, which contribute to rising levels of smog that may have reflected and blocked sunlight from reaching the Earth, altering patterns of warming. The subsequent rise of drought correlated with the decrease in global air pollution, which occurred in the 1970s and 1980s due to the passage of legislation like the United States Clean Air Act, suggesting that aerosol pollution may have had a moderating effect on drought.

Marvel has also studied practical limitations in renewable energy as a Postdoctoral Scholar at the Carnegie Institution for Science. At the 2017 TED conference, following computer theorist Danny Hillis's talk proposing geoengineering strategies to mitigate global warming, Marvel was brought on stage to share why she believes geoengineering may cause more harm than good in the long run.

Marvel returned to the NASA Goddard Institute for Space Studies in 2024, but resigned her position as an associate research physicist in 2026. According to the New York Times, "citing the Trump administration's attacks on climate science," she "said in an interview that the administration's actions made it impossible to remain." She stated that "none of [her] internally funded science projects were funded." She remains a visiting scholar at New York University.

== Public engagement ==
Marvel is a science communicator whose efforts center on communicating about the impacts of climate change. She has been a guest on popular science shows like StarTalk and BRIC Arts Media TV, speaking about her expertise in climate change and the need to act on climate. She has also spoken about her path to becoming a scientist for the science-inspired storytelling series, The Story Collider. Marvel has also appeared on the TED Main Stage, giving a talk at the 2017 TED conference about the double-edged effect clouds can have on global warming. Marvel has given lectures on climate science in a comedy clubs and at a prison.

Marvel's writing has been featured in On Being and Nautilus. She was a regular contributor to Scientific American with her column "Hot Planet", which launched in June 2018 and apparently ended in November 2020; the column focused on climate change, covering the science behind global warming, policies, and human efforts in advocacy. Marvel contributed to All We Can Save, a collection of essays authored by women involved in the climate movement.

In 2025, Marvel released the book Human Nature: Nine Ways to Feel About Our Changing Planet in which she describes the Earth's changing climate framed through human emotions.
