= Ayana Elizabeth Johnson =

Marine biologist, policy expert (born 1980)

Ayana Johnson
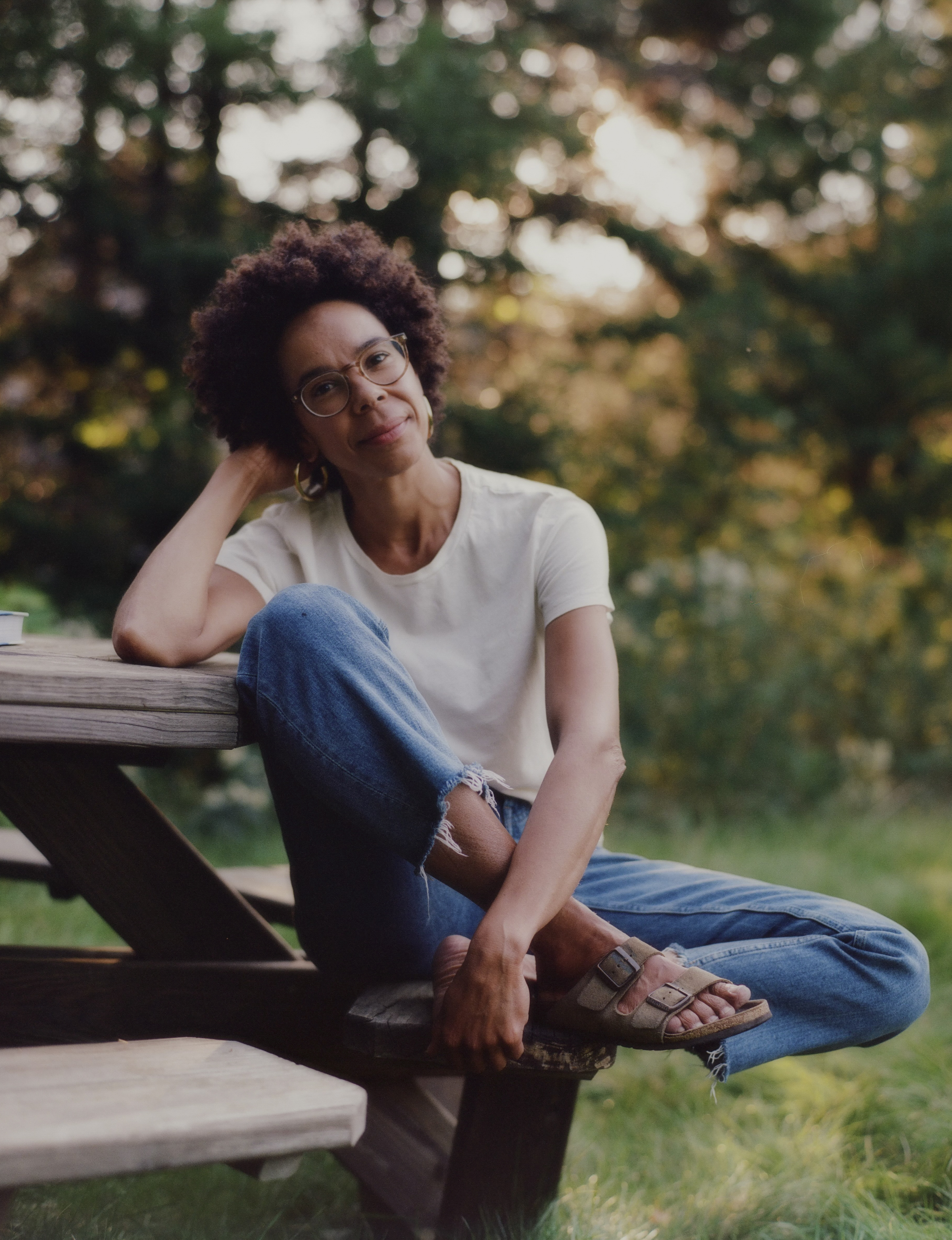
- Born: 1980 or 1981 (age 45–46)
- Education: Harvard University (BA); University of California, San Diego (MS, PhD)
- Organization: Urban Ocean Lab
- Known for: Marine biology Marine conservation Climate communication Climate policy
- Board member of: Patagonia; Greenwave
- Awards: Time100 NEXT 2021
- Scientific career
- Thesis: Fish, Fishing, Diving and the Management of Coral Reefs (2011)
- Doctoral advisor: Jeremy Jackson
- Website: Official website

External videos
- How to find joy in climate action, TED2022; A Coral Reef Love Story, TED2019

Ayana Elizabeth Johnson (born 1980 or 1981) is a marine biologist, policy expert, and conservation strategist. She is the co-founder of Urban Ocean Lab, a think tank for ocean-climate policy in coastal cities, and the Roux Distinguished Scholar at Bowdoin College. She is the author of What If We Get It Right? Visions of Climate Futures (2024). She also co-edited All We Can Save and co-authored the Blue New Deal.

She was an adjunct professor at New York University in the Department of Environmental Studies and previously worked for the U.S. Environmental Protection Agency, National Oceanic and Atmospheric Administration (NOAA).

== Early life and education ==
Johnson grew up in Brooklyn, New York, as the daughter of a teacher/farmer and an architect/potter. In high school, she served in the Student Conservation Association, working on the Continental Divide Trail in the San Juan Mountains.

Johnson earned a Bachelor of Arts degree in environmental science and public policy at Harvard University in 2002, where she was a friend of actress Tatyana Ali. In 2011, Johnson earned a PhD in marine biology from Scripps Institution of Oceanography at the University of California, San Diego. Her PhD research focused on understanding multi-disciplinary sustainable management approaches for coral reef resources, and her dissertation was entitled Fish, Fishing, Diving and the Management of Coral Reefs.

For her research, Johnson was awarded a National Science Foundation (NSF) Graduate Research Fellowship, an NSF Integrative Graduate Education and Research Traineeship (IGERT) Fellowship, a Switzer Environmental Fellowship, and was a 2010–11 American Association of University Women fellow. In 2012, the fish trap she invented to reduce bycatch won the first Rare/National Geographic Solutions Search contest.

== Career ==
Johnson's research interests focus on urban ocean conservation, sustainable fishing, ocean zoning, climate change, and social justice. Johnson has conducted research on the bycatch impacts in Caribbean coral reef trap fisheries and has also collaborated on research related to international collaboration for reducing the impacts of climate change on small island states.

Prior to graduate school, Johnson worked for the U.S. Environmental Protection Agency. After completing her PhD, Johnson worked for the National Oceanic and Atmospheric Administration and then went on to work as the Director of Science and Solutions at the Waitt Foundation in Washington, D.C., to fund ocean conservation projects. In 2013, she became executive director of the Waitt Institute and co-founded the Blue Halo Initiative to partner with governments and local communities in Barbuda, Montserrat, and Curaçao to enact more sustainable plans for ocean use and conservation. With the Blue Halo Initiative, Johnson led the Caribbean's first successful ocean zoning project, providing maps, communications, policy support, and scientific assistance to the island Barbuda as it began to regulate and protect its coastal waters.

Currently, Johnson works as a consultant for ocean conservation and climate policy issues and leads Urban Ocean Lab, an ocean policy think tank that she co-founded with Jean Flemma and Marquise Stillwell. Until 2021 she was the founder and president of Ocean Collectiv, a consulting firm that helped find ocean "conservation solutions grounded in social justice". She is also a former adjunct professor in the Department of Environmental Studies at New York University.

Johnson was a national co-director of partnerships for the inaugural March For Science in 2017.

In August 2020, Johnson launched the How to Save a Planet podcast with co-creator and co-host Alex Blumberg. In September 2020 One World/Penguin Random House published Johnson's first book, All We Can Save, which is an anthology of writing by women climate leaders edited by Johnson and Katharine Wilkinson.

In November 2021, Johnson organized a joint statement signed by over 100 notable figures demanding that Edelman end its work with fossil fuel companies, such as Exxon. She also promoted the hashtag #EdelmanDropExxon on social media.

She was the editor for The Best American Science and Nature Writing 2022 – a collection of science and nature articles published in 2021.

In July 2023, Johnson began a three-year tenure as the Roux Distinguished Scholar at Bowdoin College.

In September 2024, Johnson published the New York Times Bestselling book What If We Get It Right? Visions of Climate Futures published by One World/Penguin Random House. It received a starred review in Publishers Weekly, which called it "a much-needed antidote to 'climate grief.'" In November 2025, the book won the Phi Beta Kappa Award for Science.

== Honors and recognition ==
In 2014, Johnson was named a Mack Lipkin Man and Nature Series Fellow. She was selected as an inaugural TED resident in Spring 2016 and was a 2016 Aspen Institute Fellow. She was named a University of California San Diego "40 Under 40" outstanding alumni. She serves on the board of directors for Patagonia, Greenwave, and World Surf League's PURE campaign as well as on the advisory board for the Environmental Voter Project.

She was formerly on the advisory boards for the Simons Foundation's Science Sandbox, Scientific American, and Oceanic Global.

In 2016, Johnson delivered a TED talk in New York City, "How to Use the Ocean Without Using it Up". She delivered a second TED talk in Vancouver, "A Love Story for the Coral Reef Crisis". In 2017, she was a keynote speaker at the Smithsonian Institution "Earth Optimism" conference. She advised and moderated the inaugural World Ocean Festival in 2017. In February 2018, she took part in the YouTube series "Exploring By The Seat Of Your Pants". In February 2021, she was named a Time100 Next, nominated by Gina McCarthy.

In June 2022, Johnson was appointed a member of the US Secretary of State, Antony Blinken's Foreign Affairs Policy Board.

In October 2025, Johnson received a TIME Earth award for her work of promoting climate solutions.

== Media coverage ==
Johnson's work has been covered by The New York Times, Nature journal, Scientific American, and The Atlantic. Her conservation and policy work is frequently profiled in popular media, including The Observer, Atlas of the Future, Outside, and Elle, which named her as one of the "27 Women Leading the Charge to Protect Our Environment".

Johnson's writing about the intersections of climate change, ocean conservation, and environmental justice has been published in numerous outlets, including The New York Times, The Washington Post, Time, and Scientific American. She was interviewed by the NPR podcast, Short Wave, in 2020 following her Washington Post op-ed. Since 2013, she has contributed to the National Geographic Society and HuffPost blogs.
