= Amanda Sturgeon =

Amanda Sturgeon is an architect and champion of sustainable architecture through practices like regenerative design and biophilic design. Previously CEO of the International Living Future Institute, she joined Mott MacDonald as the Regenerative Design Lead for the Asia Pacific Region in 2020. In November 2023, she became the CEO of The Biomimicry Institute.

She was elected a 2013 fellow for the American Institute of Architects and a 2013 fellow at Leadership in Energy and Environmental Design. In 2005, she got a Women in Sustainability Leadership Award. She gave a TED talk in 2018 as part of TEDMED. In 2019, she was a keynote speaker at Verdical Group's annual Net Zero Conference. Amanda Sturgeon contributed to the collection of essay and fiction by women in the climate change movement All We Can Save.

Sturgeon was also a founding board member of the Cascadia Green Building Council, a chapter of the U.S. Green Building Council, and the co-director of national sustainable design at Perkins+Will, an international architectural firm.

As of 2022, Sturgeon is a member of the board of Climate Action Network Australia Inc.

She is the author of Creating Biophilic Buildings (Ecotone, 2017).

== Early life and education ==
Sturgeon was born in England, went to school in Australia, and started her architecture practice in the United States. She completed a Bachelor of Science at the University of Sydney and a Masters of Architecture from the University of Wisconsin–Milwaukee.
