= Bonfouca, Louisiana =

Unincorporated community in Louisiana

- Unincorporated community
- Location within Louisiana Location within the United States
- Coordinates: 30°16′09″N 89°50′40″W
- Country: United States
- State: Louisiana
- Parish: St. Tammany
- Elevation: 3 ft (0.91 m)
- Time zone: UTC-6 (Central (CST))
  - Summer (DST): UTC-5 (CDT)
- Area code: 985
- GNIS feature ID: 560246

Bonfouca (also Bonfonca, Boucffouca, Bouefuka, Boukfouca) is an unincorporated community in St. Tammany Parish, Louisiana, United States. It is on Louisiana Highway 433 adjacent to Liberty Bayou two miles west of Slidell.

== Etymology ==
It is speculated that the name derives from the Choctaw language words "bok", meaning river, and fuka, meaning home or residence. Bokfuka was the name of a Choctaw chief who attacked the German Coast of Louisiana in the year 1747. In 1802 Louis-Narcisse Baudry Des Lozieres documented the name of the tribe. He referred to the 18th century chief as "Bonifoucas", a French transliteration of the Choctaw.
