= Leah Stokes =

Canadian political scientist

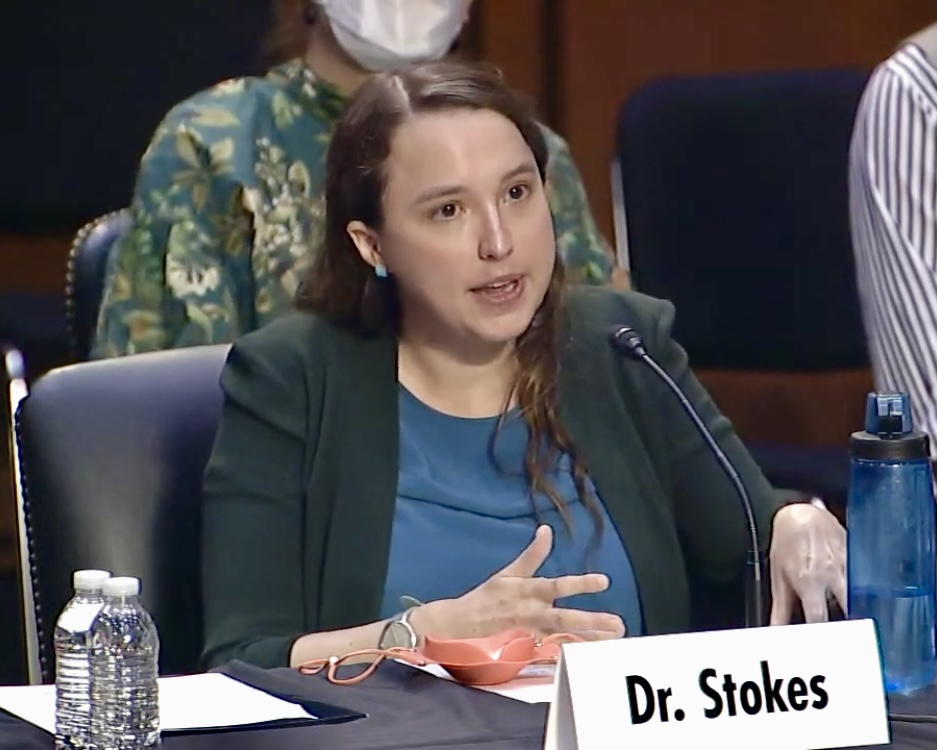
- Stokes in 2021
- Education: University of Toronto (BS); Columbia University (MPA); Massachusetts Institute of Technology (PhD)
- Scientific career
- Fields: Energy, climate and environmental politics
- Institutions: University of California, Santa Barbara
- Thesis: Power Politics: Renewable Energy Policy Change in US States (2015)
- Doctoral advisor: Lawrence Susskind

Leah Cardamore Stokes is a Canadian-American political scientist specializing in environmental policy. She is the Anton Vonk Associate Professor of Environmental Politics at the University of California, Santa Barbara. In addition, Stokes is a senior policy consultant at Evergreen Action and Rewiring America. She also hosts the climate change podcast A Matter of Degrees. Her research focuses on political behavior, public opinion, and the politics of energy and environmental policy in the United States.

== Early life and education ==
Stokes earned her undergraduate degree in psychology and East Asian studies at the University of Toronto. She completed a Master of Public Administration at Columbia University. After graduating, Stokes worked at Resources for the Future. She went on to work at the Parliament of Canada. Her role involved policy analysis for Members of Parliament working on the Environment and Sustainable Development Committee, and the Standing Committee on Indigenous and Northern Affairs. In 2010, Stokes moved to the Massachusetts Institute of Technology, where she earned a master's degree and a doctorate under the supervision of Lawrence Susskind. At MIT, Stokes created environmental policy curriculum, including The Mercury Game, a treaty negotiation that has been used by over 100 universities around the world.

== Career ==
In 2015, Stokes joined the faculty at the University of California, Santa Barbara. Her research focuses on energy policy and environmental policy in the United States. She has investigated the interaction between public opinion and policy making on renewable energy. She has also looked at how the design and presentation of Renewable Portfolio Standards (RPS) changes public support for a particular policy. She has also published research on backlash against renewable energy projects. Her recent work examines Congressional staff and their understanding of public opinion.

Stokes is also a senior policy consultant at Evergreen Action and Rewiring America, where she focuses on federal policy advocacy to address climate change and accelerate electrification. In September 2021, she gave testimony on electrification to the Joint Economic Committee in Congress. Tina Smith, Senator for Minnesota, described Stokes as a "powerhouse contributor" to the passage of the Inflation Reduction Act of 2022, the largest investment into addressing climate change in United States history.

In October 2020, Stokes and Katharine Wilkinson started the podcast A Matter of Degrees, in which they discuss the levers of power that have created the climate problem and the tools to fix it.

=== Awards and honours ===
- 2018 Midwest Political Science Association Patrick J. Fett Award
- 2019 Business and Politics (journal) David P. Baron Award
- 2019 Jack Walker Award, Best Article on Political Organizations and Parties from APSA, 2019.
- 2019 Information Technology and Innovation Foundation Scholar
- 2020 Grist 50 Fixer
- 2020 Harold J. Plous Award, UC Santa Barbara
- 2020 Best Energy Book, “Short Circuiting Policy,” American Energy Society
- 2022 Business Insider Climate Action 30
- 2022 Time 100 Next

=== Selected publications ===
- Stokes, Leah C. (April 15, 2020). Short Circuiting Policy: Interest Groups and the Battle Over Clean Energy and Climate Policy in the American States. Oxford University Press. p. 336. ISBN 9780190074265.
- Hertel-Fernandez, A.; Mildenberger, Matto; Stokes, Leah C. (2019). "Legislative Staff and Representation in Congress". American Political Science Review. 113 (1): 1–18. doi:10.1017/S0003055418000606. S2CID 145024966.
- Stokes, Leah C.; Breetz, Hanna L. (2018). "Politics in the US energy transition: Case studies of solar, wind, biofuels and electric vehicles policy". Energy Policy. 113: 76–86. doi:10.1016/j.enpol.2017.10.057. S2CID 53973121.
- Stokes, Leah C.; C., Warshaw (2017). "Renewable energy policy design and framing influence public support in the United States". Nature Energy. 2 (8): 1–6. doi:10.1038/nenergy.2017.107. hdl:1721.1/158530. S2CID 59406969.
- Stokes, Leah C. (2016). "Electoral backlash against climate policy: A natural experiment on retrospective voting and local resistance to public policy". American Journal of Political Science. 60 (4): 958–974. doi:10.1111/ajps.12220. hdl:1721.1/99561.
- Stokes, Leah C. (2013). "The politics of renewable energy policies: The case of feed-in tariffs in Ontario, Canada". Energy Policy. 56: 490–500. doi:10.1016/j.enpol.2013.01.009.
