= Ocean zoning =

Policy approach for environmental resource management in oceanic environments

Ocean zoning is a policy approach for environmental resource management in oceanic environments. This, often big picture, approach to ocean management allocates areas for various ocean uses. Types of zones can include areas designated for marine protected areas (including marine reserves), aquaculture, various types of fishing, shipping, recreation (including scuba diving), mooring/anchoring, and energy production (including offshore wind power). The process of marine spatial planning can result in ocean zones being legally established.

Benefits of ocean zoning can include reducing conflict between users, safeguarding ecologically important areas, enabling commercial activity to develop with certainty, and supporting international cooperation. Balancing environmental, economic, security, social, and cultural interests in delineation of zone boundaries remains a key challenge of ocean zoning.
