= Ailish Hopper =

American poet, writer and teacher

- Born: Washington, District of Columbia
- Education: Princeton University (A.B.); Bennington College (M.F.A.)
- Employer: Goucher College
- Website: http://www.ailishhopper.net/

Ailish Hopper is an American poet, writer and teacher.

== Biography ==
Hopper released a chapbook titled Bird in the Head in 2005, and has since published a poetry collection called Dark~Sky Society (2014), which explores racial tensions. In an interview with WYPR, she has noted her interest in race relations as being a consequence of her coming of age in DC and of her Irish heritage. Hopper's poetry has also been included in Agni, American Poetry Review, Ploughshares, Poetry, Harvard Review Online, Tidal Basin Review, among others. In addition to page poetry, she has performed with the band Heroes are Gang Leaders, along with poets Thomas Sayers Ellis and Randall Horton, and saxophonist James Brandon Lewis. Hopper has also written essays about race relations, including one in Boston Review, "Can a Poem Listen? Variations on Being-white."

Hopper graduated with an A.B. in religion and a certificate in African American studies from Princeton University in 1993 after completing a senior thesis under the supervision of Cornel West. She later received an M.F.A. in creative writing and literature from Bennington College. She has received fellowships from the MacDowell Colony, the Vermont Studio, and Yaddo. Until 2025 she was an associate professor in Goucher College's peace studies department.

== Published works ==
- "Did it Ever Occur to You that Maybe You're Falling in Love" Poetry magazine, January 2016
- "The Good Caucasian" Harvard Review Online, August 2014
- "Dream, Technidifficult" Academy of American Poets
- Dark~Sky Society (New Issues, 2014)
- Bird in the Head (Center for Book Arts, 2005)

=== In anthology ===
- Ghost Fishing: An Eco-Justice Poetry Anthology (University of Georgia Press, 2018)

== Reviews ==
- Jane Hirshfield: "Hopper attends to an examination of her own place in this American landscape of intimate and indelible participation...and offers to say what the less courageous or less moved leave unsaid."
- Douglas Kearney: "Hopper's lines halt, knot, interdigitate, and stutter, but they never flinch. She leaves that to the reader. What she doesn't offer us are easy epiphanies, a bid for being a good caucasian, or post-race snake oil. This is difficult work for a time when 'any touch/will bruise'. Dark~Sky Society insists we reach and be reached anyway."
- Melanie Henderson: "Ailish Hopper is a poet's poet, being brave and fearless in style and content."
