= Christine Nieves =

Puerto Rican activist

Christine E. Nieves
- Born: London, England
- Education: University of Pennsylvania; University of Oxford
- Occupation: Community organizer
- Employer: Emerge Puerto Rico

Christine Nieves is a Puerto Rican community organizer and climate change activist. She is the founder of Emerge Puerto Rico, a community redevelopment non-profit.

Nieves focuses on building community resilience before and after environmental disasters, such as Hurricane Maria in 2017 and the series of earthquakes in Puerto Rico in 2020. Her organization, formerly called Apoyo Mutuo Mariana, provided free meals for a mountainous community that was heavily impacted by the storm.

== Education ==
Nieves attended the University of Pennsylvania for her bachelor's degree. She later earned a master's degree at University of Oxford.

== Activism ==
Nieves emphasizes the importance of community and self-sufficiency when preparing for climate change, in part because of the lack of government assistance after Hurricane Maria. Nieves has worked with "anarchist organizers" to accomplish greater community independence. She also speaks about mental health and challenges that come after disasters.

Nieves founded Emerge Puerto Rico, a "climate change leadership startup" and non-profit. She gave a talk about her work toward community-based resilience at TEDMED in 2018.

She is a 2020 Echoing Green fellow.
