= Student Conference on Conservation Science =

The Student Conference on Conservation Science (in short it is known as SCCS) is a series of conferences conducted in United Kingdom, Australia, China, India, the USA and Hungary. It is largely conducted by the student community in partnership with research and conservation organisations in these countries. It started in 2000 in Cambridge and has hosted over 3400 delegates from 136 countries worldwide. It helps young scientists in conservation gain experience, learn new ideas and create connections that will be useful for their future careers.
