= Waitt Institute =

US-based nonprofit organization

The Waitt Institute is a non-governmental organization partnering with island governments and communities to support the implementation of sustainable ocean plans. It provides research, expertise and tools to develop and implement effective ocean plans, supporting countries to achieve their ocean related sustainable development goals. It is headquartered in San Diego and current projects include The Azores, Bermuda, Barbuda, Curaçao, Federated States of Micronesia, Fiji, Maldives, Montserrat, Samoa, and Tonga.

== History ==
Founded in 1999 after founder, Ted Waitt, retired from Gateway. The Institute collaborates with countries and communities to create impact through expertise in ocean conservation in collaboration with financial support from the Waitt Foundation. The institute has become the leading entity assisting partner countries with their marine spatial planning, blue economy planning, and sustainable fisheries.

The Institute helped conduct and fund analyses of possible locations of the remains of Amelia Earhart's last flight.
