= Katharine Wilkinson =

American writer and climate change activist

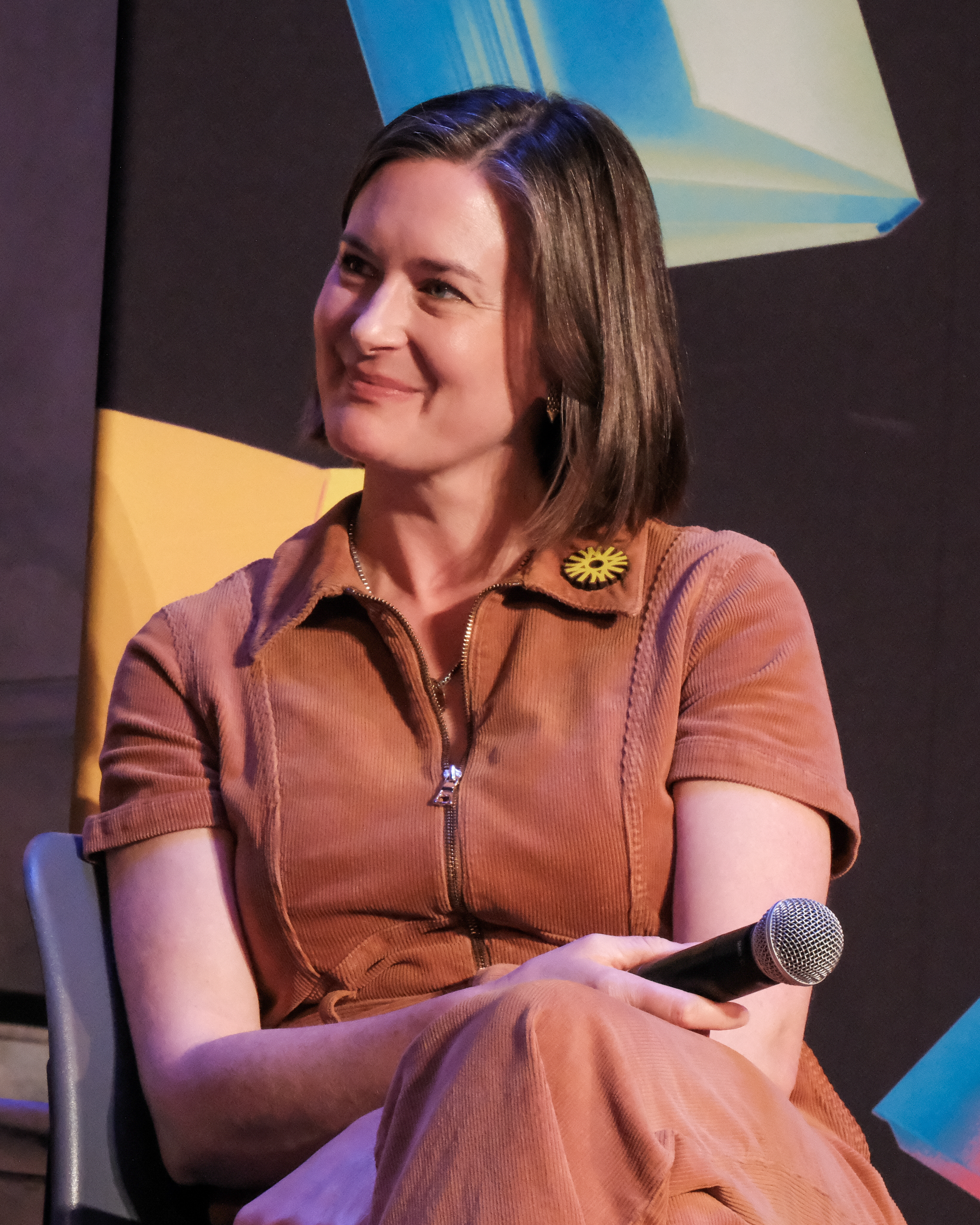
- Wilkinson in 2026
- Education: Sewanee: The University of the South (BA); University of Oxford, Rhodes Scholar (D.Phil.)
- Scientific career
- Doctoral advisor: Diana Liverman
- Website: kkwilkinson.com

Katharine K. Wilkinson is an American writer, climate change activist, and executive director and co-founder of the All We Can Save Project, a climate leadership organization. She co-hosts the podcast A Matter of Degrees with Leah Stokes. Previously, Wilkinson served as editor-in-chief of The Drawdown Review at Project Drawdown and was the senior writer for The New York Times bestseller Drawdown, which documents the "what is possible" approach for addressing climate change. Time named her one of 15 "women who will save the world" in 2019.

Wilkinson is in part known for her role in advocating for women in climate change activism including her 2018 TED talk. She co-edited the All We Can Save anthology of women climate leaders with Ayana Elizabeth Johnson. The Academy of American Poets made her a judge of the Treehouse Climate Action Poem Prize.

Her books on climate include the bestselling anthology All We Can Save (2020, co-editor), The Drawdown Review (2020, editor-in-chief and principal writer), The New York Times bestseller Drawdown (2017, senior writer), and Between God & Green (2012), which The Boston Globe dubbed “a vitally important, even subversive, story.”

== Early life and education ==
Wilkinson, a native of Atlanta, Georgia, earned an undergraduate degree in religion from Sewanee, where she is occasionally visiting faculty. While attending Sewanee, she was twice awarded a Udall Scholarship and graduated as valedictorian. As a Rhodes Scholar, she was awarded a Doctor of Philosophy in geography and environment from University of Oxford. She completed her dissertation under the supervision of geographer Diana Liverman.

== Career ==
Wilkinson began her career as a consultant at the Natural Resources Defense Council (NRDC). In 2005, she was awarded the Rhodes Scholarship to attend the University of Oxford, where she earned her Doctorate of Philosophy. Based on that research, she published her first book, Between God & Green, with Oxford University Press in 2012. Following her graduate work, Wilkinson went into strategy consulting at the Boston Consulting Group and then BrightHouse.

In 2016, Wilkinson joined Project Drawdown, where she worked as the senior writer of Drawdown (2017), vice president of communication and engagement, and then principal writer and editor-in-chief of The Drawdown Review (2020).

In September 2020, Wilkinson and Ayana Elizabeth Johnson published All We Can Save with One World, an imprint of Random House. The anthology of writings by women climate leaders became a national bestseller, and Wilkinson created All We Can Save Circles to build community around solutions.

In October, 2020, Leah Stokes and Wilkinson started the podcast A Matter of Degrees, in which they discuss the levers of power that have created the climate problem, and the tools to fix it. The podcast has received critical acclaim, with Bill McKibben saying, “I can testify firsthand that A Matter of Degrees, a new podcast from Leah Stokes and Katharine Wilkinson, two of the most important and reliable voices in the climate debate, is going to be a don’t-miss show.”

She currently serves as the executive director and co-founder of the All We Can Save Project, with the mission to nurture a leaderful climate community. She sits on the boards of the Doc Society, Chattahoochee NOW, WildArk and serves as an advisor for Drawdown Georgia and Terra.do.

=== Speaking and Publications ===
Wilkinson has spoken at forums including Aspen Ideas, TEDWomen, National Geographic, The New York Times, Skoll World Forum, and the United Nations. Beyond her books, Wilkinson has written pieces for multiple media outlets including The Washington Post, Time, Elle, and CNN.

=== Honors and recognition ===
In addition to being selected as a Rhodes and Udall Scholar in her early career, Wilkinson was recognized as LEAD Atlanta: Class of 2014. She was named Planned Parenthood Southeast: Legend in the Making (2019), Time: 15 women who will save the world (2019), Apolitical’s] 100 most influential people in gender policy (2021), and Georgia Trend: Notable Georgians (2022).

=== Media ===
Wilkinson’s work has been featured in media outlets including The New York Times, Democracy Now!, The TODAY Show, Time, Rolling Stone, The New Yorker, and The Washington Post
