= List of women climate scientists and activists =

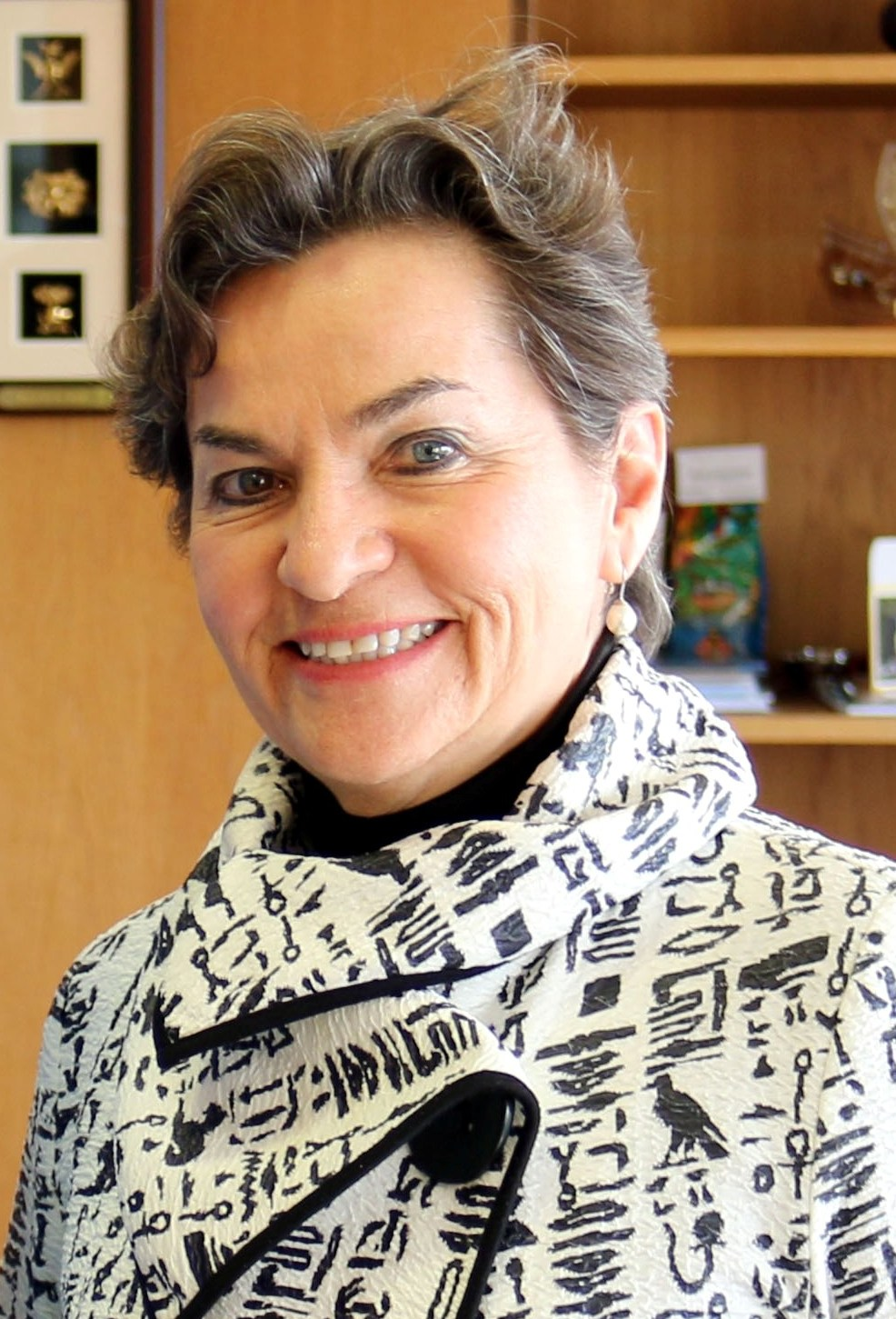
Costa Rican climate change diplomat

The following is a list of women climate scientists and activists by nationality – women who are well known for their work in the field of climatology.

== Introduction ==
Women have made major contributions to climate change research and policy and to broader analysis of global environmental issues. They include many women scientists as well as policy makers and activists. Women researchers have made significant contributions to major scientific assessments such as those of the Millennium Ecosystem Assessment and are reasonably well represented on key global change committees of the International Council for Science (ICSU) and US National Academy of Sciences. They have played important leadership roles in international climate policy. For example, Christiana Figueres leads the international climate negotiations as the Executive Secretary of the UN Framework Convention on Climate Change (UNFCCC) and former Irish President Mary Robinson is the UN Special Envoy on Climate Change. Susan Solomon chaired the climate science working group 1 of the Intergovernmental Panel on Climate Change Fourth Assessment in 2007. Since 1990, women have been playing an increasingly important role on the Intergovernmental Panel on Climate Change, a key international forum.

== Afghanistan ==
- Zuhal Atmar, pioneering environmentalist who ran a recycling plant
- Faiza Darkhani (born 1992), environmentalist, climate change scholar, and women's rights activist

== Argentina ==
- Inés Camilloni (born 1964), climatologist studying climate change in South America

== Australia ==
- Nerilie Abram (born 1977), researcher in climate change and paleoclimatology
- Tracy Ainsworth, marine biologist working on coral reefs
- Lisa Alexander, international expert on heatwaves
- Julie Arblaster, climate change researcher, contributor to Intergovernmental Panel on Climate Change
- Sue Barrell, meteorologist active in climate monitoring and ocean-earth observations
- Kirsten Benkendorff (born 1973), marine scientist working on molluscs
- Wendy Bowman (born c.1934), environmental activist
- Wendy Craik (born 1949), scientist working for the Climate Change Authority
- Adriana Dutkiewicz, sedimentologist at the University of Sydney
- Ann Henderson-Sellers (born 1952), climate change risk evaluation
- Taryn Lane, renewable energy expert
- Judith Lean, Australian-American solar and climate scientist
- India Logan-Riley, Māori climate activist
- Janice Lough, climate scientist researching coral reefs
- Amanda Lynch, Professor of Earth, Environmental and Planetary Sciences at Brown University and the founding director of the Institute at Brown for Environment and Society. She is an expert in polar climate system modelling, indigenous environmental knowledge and climate policy analysis. She is a Fellow of the American Meteorological Society, the Australian Academy of Technological Sciences and Engineering and the Norwegian Scientific Academy for Polar Research.
- Cara Augustenborg (1938–2017), Slovene-American artist and environmental activist
- Ann Henderson-Sellers (born 1952), earth systems scientist focusing on climatic impacts
- Jane McAdam (born 1974), legal expert on climate change and refugees
- Helen McGregor, geologist and climate change researcher, Research School of Earth Sciences at the Australian National University
- Amanda McKenzie, commentator on climate change
- Jessica Melbourne-Thomas, marine ecologist and ecosystem modeller
- Sam Mostyn (born c.1964), businesswoman active in climate change
- Sarah Perkins-Kirkpatrick (born 1983), heatwave research
- Anjali Sharma (born 2004), child climate activist
- Kate Trinajstic, paleontologist and evolutionary biologist
- Jo Vallentine (born 1946), anti-nuclear activist
- Carden Wallace, marine biologist and museum director, expert on corals
- Shemara Wikramanayake (born 1962), businesswoman striving for low carbon emissions and renewable energy production
- Penny Whetton (1958–2019), regional climate change projections for Australia
- Katherine Woodthorpe, executive involved in bushfire and natural hazards

== Belgium ==
- Margaretha Guidone (born c.1956), activist campaigning against global warming

== Bolivia ==
- Ximena Vélez Liendo (born 1976), biologist focusing on the ecology of the Andean bear

== Brazil ==
- Rosaly Lopes (born 1957), geologist specializing in volcanology
- Antônia Melo (born 1949), environmentalist and human rights activist

== Cameroon ==
- Sevidzem Ernestine Leikeki (born 1985), climate activist

== Canada ==
- Eriel Deranger (born 1979), indigenous rights activist intent on climate action
- Marie-Josée Fortin (born 1958), spatial ecology researcher
- Natalya Gomez, climate-ice sheet-solid earth modeler, professor at McGill University
- Katharine Hayhoe (born 1972), atmospheric science, global climate models
- Nasrin Husseini, Afghan-born refugee, food activist working on improved productivity through breeding
- Cindy Kenny-Gilday (born 1954), Sahtu environmentalist and Indigenous rights activist
- Naomi Klein (born 1970), author, filmmaker and environmental activist
- Melina Laboucan-Massimo, climate justice and Indigenous rights activist
- Corinne Le Quéré (born 1966), Royal Society research professor, University of East Anglia
- Deborah Martin-Downs, aquatic biologist, ecologist
- Line Rochefort, ecologist specializing in peatland restoration
- Marie Sanderson (1921–2010), geographer and climatologist

== Chad ==
- Hindou Oumarou Ibrahim, environmental activist and geographer

== Chile ==
- Laura Gallardo (born 1962), climate scientist involved in public policy, first director of the Center for Climate and Resilience Research (CR2).
- Adriana Hoffmann (1940–2022), environmentalist involved in the sustainable management of Chilean forests
- Sara Larraín (born 1962), politician and environmental activist
- Veronica Vallejos (born c. 1967), marine biologist and Antarctic researcher

== China ==
- Chai Jing (born 1976), journalist and environmental activist producing a documentary, later banned, on pollution and environmental policy
- Howey Ou (born c. 2003), young activist inspired by Greta Thunberg

== Colombia ==
- Xiomara Acevedo, climate change activist coordinating government policy
- Paola Arias, climate change researcher
- Martha Peralta Epieyú, politician and lawyer specializing in environmental law
- Aída Quilcué (fl 1990s), environmentalist and politician
- Diana Marcela Bolaños Rodriguez (born 1981), marine biologist studying flat worms and stem cell regeneration

== Costa Rica ==
- Christiana Figueres (born 1956), diplomat specializing in international climate change negotiations
- Sofía Hernández Salazar (born 1998), youth human rights and environmental activist

== Denmark ==
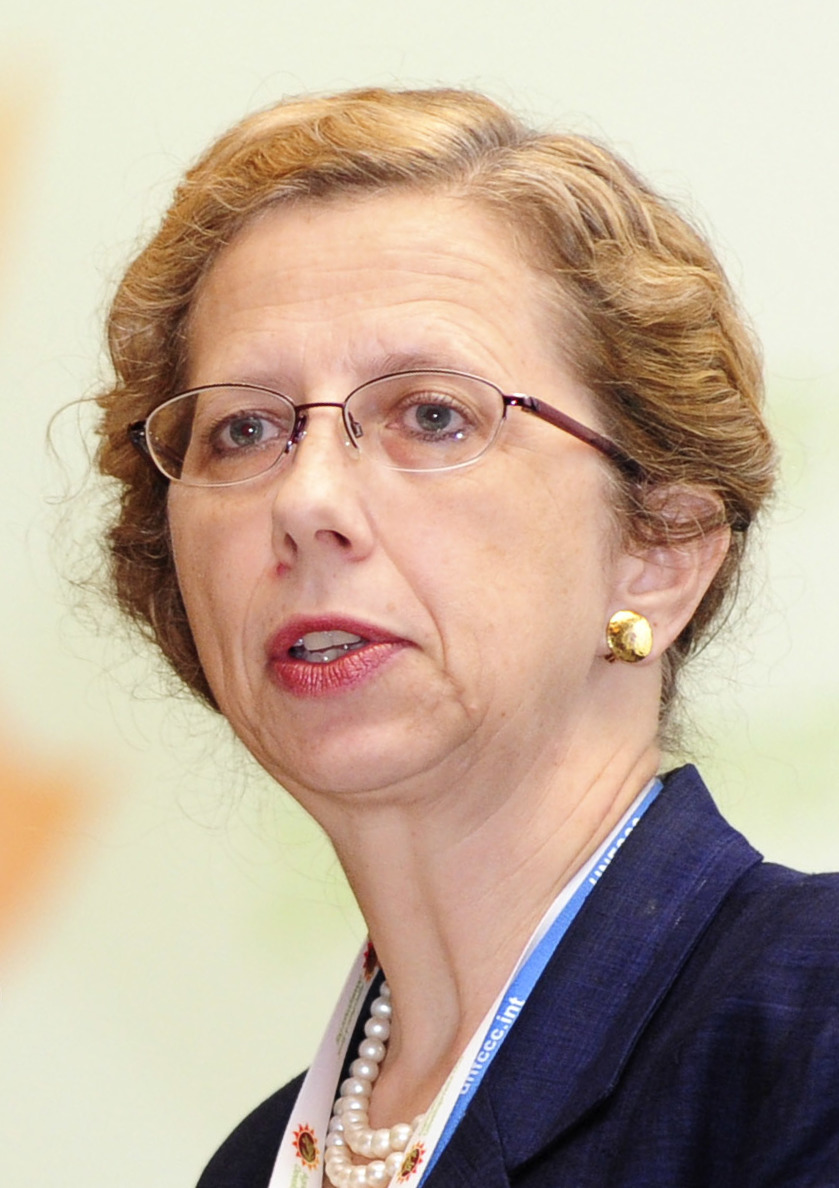
Inger Andersen, Danish environmentalist (2010)

- Inger Andersen (born 1958), economist and environmentalist working with international organizations
- Lone Drøscher Nielsen (born 1984), wildlife conservationist active in Borneo
- Inge Lehmann (1888–1993), seismologist and geophysicist
- Signe Normand, biologist researching vegetation in the arctic tundra

== Dominican Republic ==
- Idelisa Bonnelly (1931–2022), marine biologist who created first sanctuary in the North Atlantic for humpback whales

== Ecuador ==
- Anita Rivas (born 1972), lawyer and conservationist

== El Salvador ==
- Johanna Segovia (born 1982), marine ecologist

== Fiji ==
- Kavita Naidu, lawyer working on international climate change law

== Finland ==
- Hanna Kokko (born 1971), evolutionary ecologist

== France ==
- Hélène Bergès (born 1966), director of the Plant Genomic Resources Center (CNRGV), plant geneticist investigating ocean-atmospheric coupling
- Pascale Braconnot, climate scientist
- Valérie Cabanes (born 1969), lawyer and environmentalist
- Anny Cazenave (born 1944), geodesist researching sea level rise caused by global warming
- Françoise Gasse (1942–2014), paleobiologist specializing in lacustrine sediments
- Amaelle Landais-Israël (born 1977), climatologist researching Greenland ice and the North Atlantic
- Marguerite Augusta Marie Löwenhielm, mycologist studying the effectiveness of American grapevine against harmful insect pest
- Valerie Masson-Delmotte, focus on paleoclimatology at the Climate and Environment Sciences Laboratory (LSCE)
- Anaïs Orsi, climate scientist studying global warming through changes in polar ice
- Catherine Ritz, Antarctic researcher working on ice sheets and rise in sea level
- Françoise Vimeux, climatologist, research director at the Institut de recherche pour le développement (IRD), works at the Laboratoire des sciences du climat et de l'environnement (LSCE) and the Laboratoire HydroSciences Montpellier (HSM)

== The Gambia ==
- Fatou Jeng (born 1996), internationally recognized Gambian climate activist

== Germany ==
- Silvia Bender (born 1970), Green party politician
- Nancy Bertler, Antarctic researcher investigating climate history
- Lina Eichler (born 2002), climate activist
- Sabine Fuss, climate scientist focusing on sustainable resource management
- Ulrike Lohmann (born 1966), climate researcher focusing on aerosol particles in clouds
- Katrin Meissner, German and Australian physical oceanographer and climate scientist, director of the Climate Change Research Centre at University of New South Wales
- Friederike Otto (born 1982), German climatologist, associate director of the Environmental Change Institute
- Ricarda Winkelmann (born 1985), climatologist researching interdependencies between climate, land ice and the ocean
- Kirsten Zickfeld, climate physicist now based in Canada

== Ghana ==
- Nana Klutse (born 1981), climate scientist

== Guatemala ==
- Nicole Hernandez Hammer, Guatemalan-American climate scientist studying sea level rise

== Guinea-Bissau ==
- Augusta Henriques (fl. 1991), conservationist

== Honduras ==
- Berta Cáceres (1971–2016), environmental activist and indigenous leader

== Iceland ==
- Sigríður Tómasdóttir (1871–1957), environmentalist active in saving the Gullfoss waterfalls from industrialization

== India ==
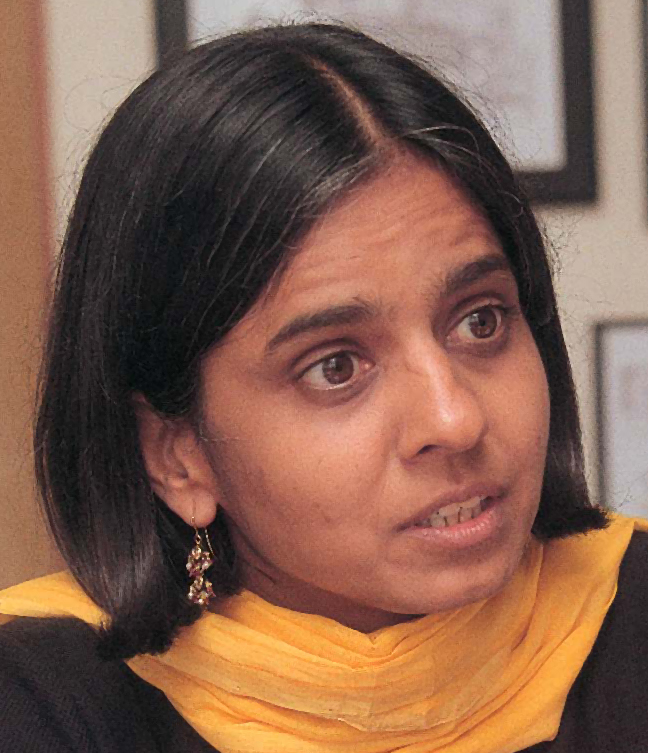
Indian climate change activist Sunita Narain (2009)

- Sulochana Gadgil (born 1944), meteorologist studying monsoons
- Paramjit Khurana (born 1956), biologist specializing in plant biotechnology
- Sunita Narain (born 1961), environmentalist, clean energy advocate and political activist
- Medha Patkar (born 1964), politician, rights activist and environmentalist
- Disha Ravi (born 1998/99), youth climate activist

== Indonesia ==
- Yuyun Ismawati (born 1964), environmental engineering involved in safe waste management involved in protecting reefs from plastic waste pollution
- Salsabila Khairunnisa (born 2003), youth climate activist
- Mia Krisna Pratiwi (born 1996), environmental engineer
- Swietenia Puspa Lestari (born 1994), environmental engineer

== Ireland ==
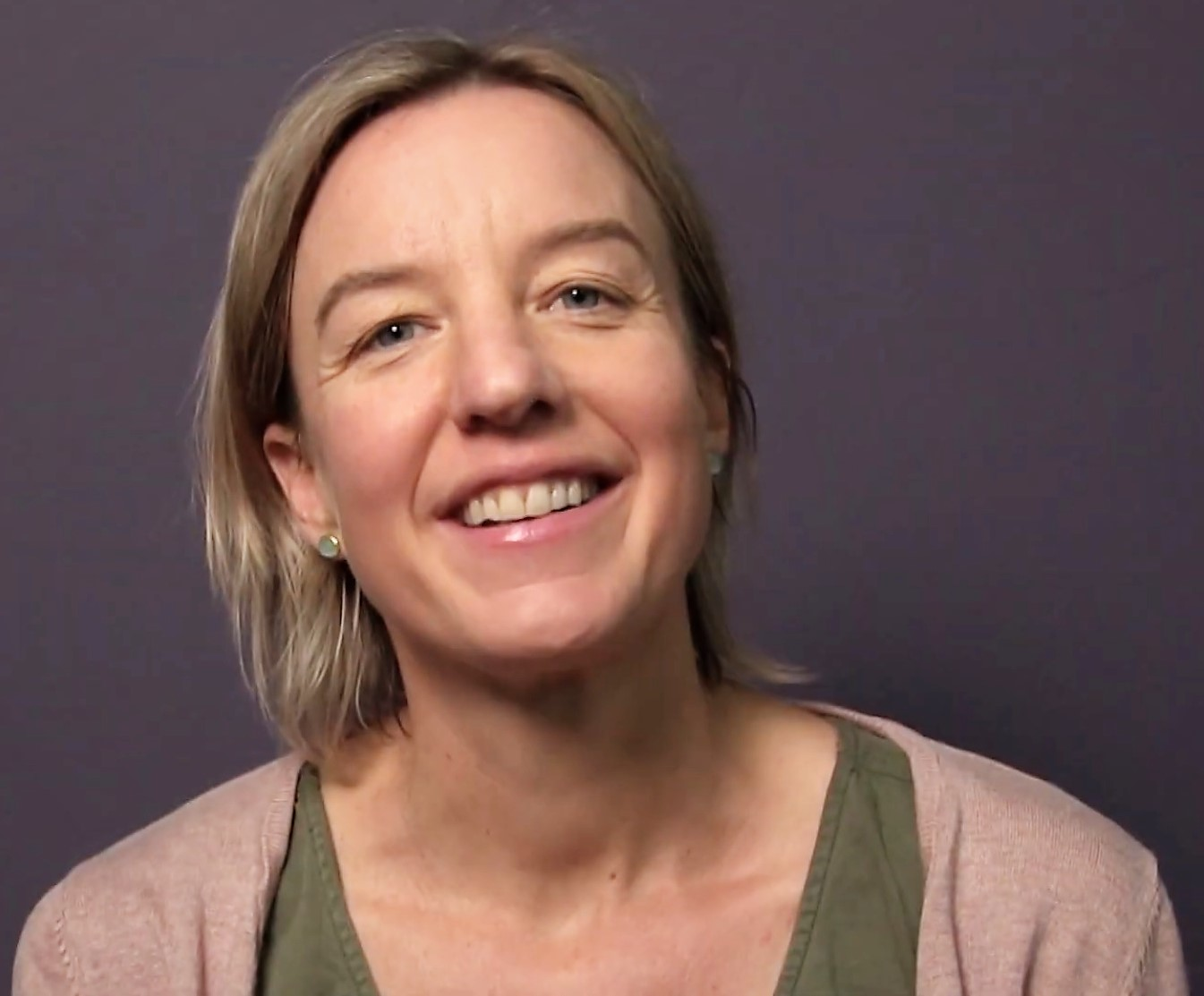
Irish environmental scientist Tara Shine (2019)

- Cara Augustenborg (born 1978), environmental scientist, also has US citizenship
- Karin Dubsky (born 1954), German-born marine ecologist and environmental activist
- Anna Kernahan, climate activist, founder of Fridays For Future Northern Ireland
- Tara Shine, environmental scientist, policy advisor and science communicator

== Italy ==
- Simona Bordoni (born 1972), climatologist studying atmospheric dynamics in California
- Nicola Scafetta (born 1975), astronomer and climate scientist

== Kenya ==
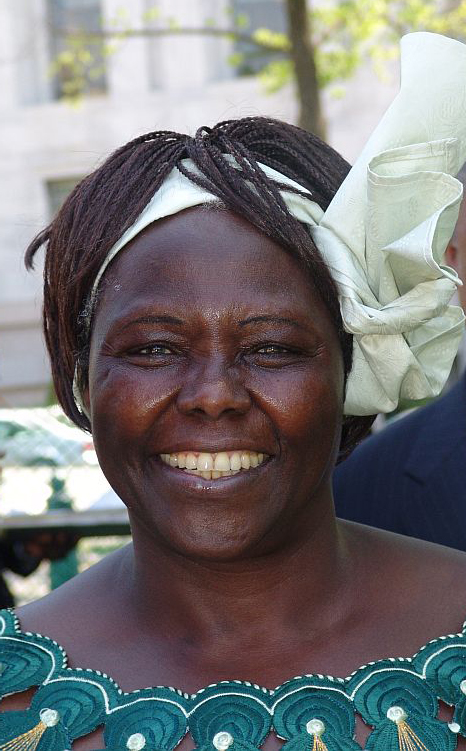
Kenyan activist Wangari Maathai (2001)

- Wangari Maathai (1940–2011), environmental activist, Nobel Peace Prize winner

== Laos ==
- Niane Sivongxay, zoologist specializing in zooplankton and amphibians

== Madagascar ==
- Marie Christina Kolo (born 1989), climate activist
- Julie Hanta Razafimanahaka, conservation biologist

== Marshall Islands ==
- Kathy Jetn̄il-Kijiner, poet and climate change activist
- Selina Leem, climate change activist and spoken word performer

== Mexico ==
- María Elena Caso (1915–1991), biologist pioneering the study if starfish and other echinoderms
- Enriqueta Legorreta (1914–2010), two-time winner (2007 & 2019) of the Aguascalientes state prize for Environmental Merit
- Enriqueta Medellín (1948–1922), winner of Mexico's highest Ecological award, the Premio al Mérito Ecológico in 2012

== Netherlands ==
- Elisabeth Gottschalk (1912–1989), investigated storm surges and river floods
- Saskia Ozinga (born 1960), environmental and social activist involved in forest conservation

== New Zealand ==
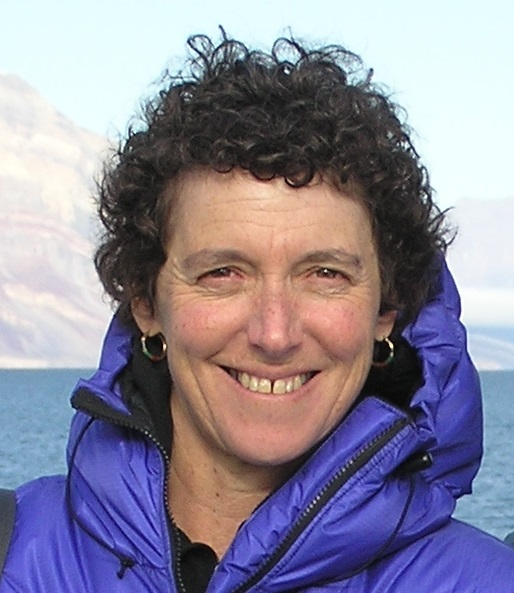
Gillian Wratt, New Zealand Arctic researcher

- Rosemary Askin (born 1949), geologist, Antarctic researcher
- Helen Plume, ministerial climate change expert
- Gillian Wratt, (born 1954), botanist and Antarctic researcher

== Niger ==
- Mariama Mamane, environmentalist focusing on the ecology of rivers

== Nigeria ==
- Francisca Oboh Ikuenobe, geologist specializing in palynology and sedimentology
- Eucharia Oluchi Nwaichi, environmental biochemist
- Margaret Adebisi Sowunmi, botanist and environmental archaeologist

== Norway ==
- Ane Hansdatter Kismul (born 1980), politician and environmentalist
- Ingrid Skjoldvær (born 1993), environmentalist active in the Nature and Youth organization
- Gunhild Stordalen (born 1979), physician and environmental advocate, founder of a climate change foundation
- Ragnhild Sundby (1922–2006), zoologist involved in environmental issues

== Papua New Guinea ==
- Mazzella Maniwavie (born 1987), mangrove conservationist and climate change activist

== Peru ==
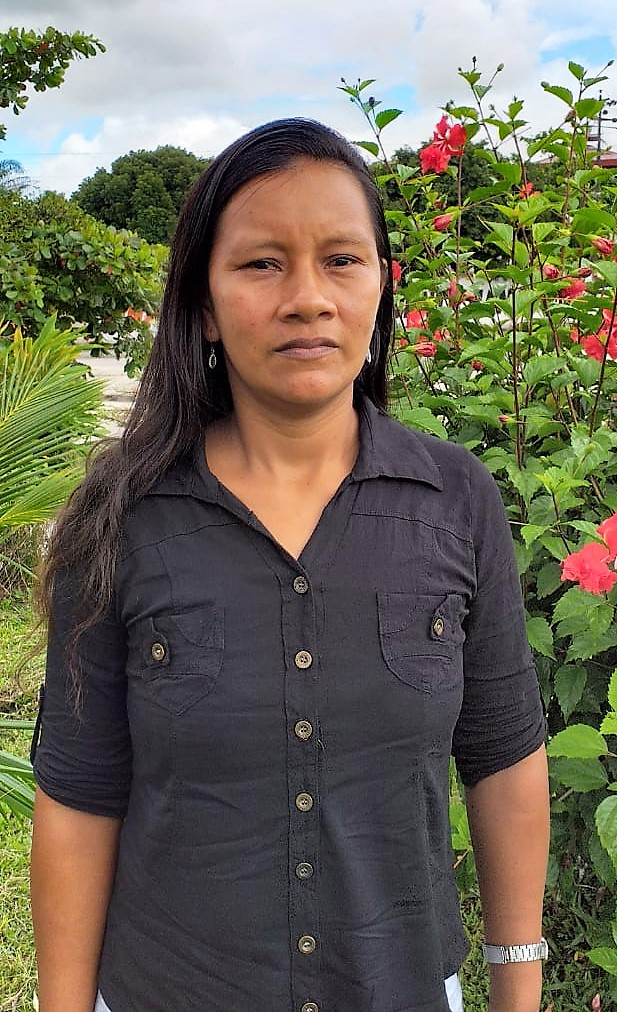
Chicaje of Peru

- Liz Chicaje (born 1962), rain forest conservationist

== Philippines ==
- Joan Carling (born 1963), human rights activist and environmentalist
- Mitzi Jonelle Tan (born 1997), climate justice activist
- Gemma Narisma (1972–2021), climate scientist focusing on assessment

== Poland ==
- Zofia Kielan-Jaworowska (1925–2015), paleobiologist, expeditions to the Gobi Desert
- Teresa Maryańska (1937–2019), paleontologist specializing in dinosaurs

== Russia ==
- Maria Klenova (1898–1976), pioneering Russian marine scientist
- Olga Zolina (born 1975), climatologist, modeling of extreme precipitation

== Rwanda ==
- Rose Mukankomeje, politician and environmental activist addressing forest conservation

== South Africa ==
- Frances Gamble (1949–1997), climatologist and speleologist

== South Korea ==
- June-Yi Lee, atmospheric scientist investigating future climate scenarios

== Spain ==
- Paca Blanco (born 1949), environmentalist and women's rights activist
- Aida Fernández Ríos (1947–2015), climate scientist and marine biologist

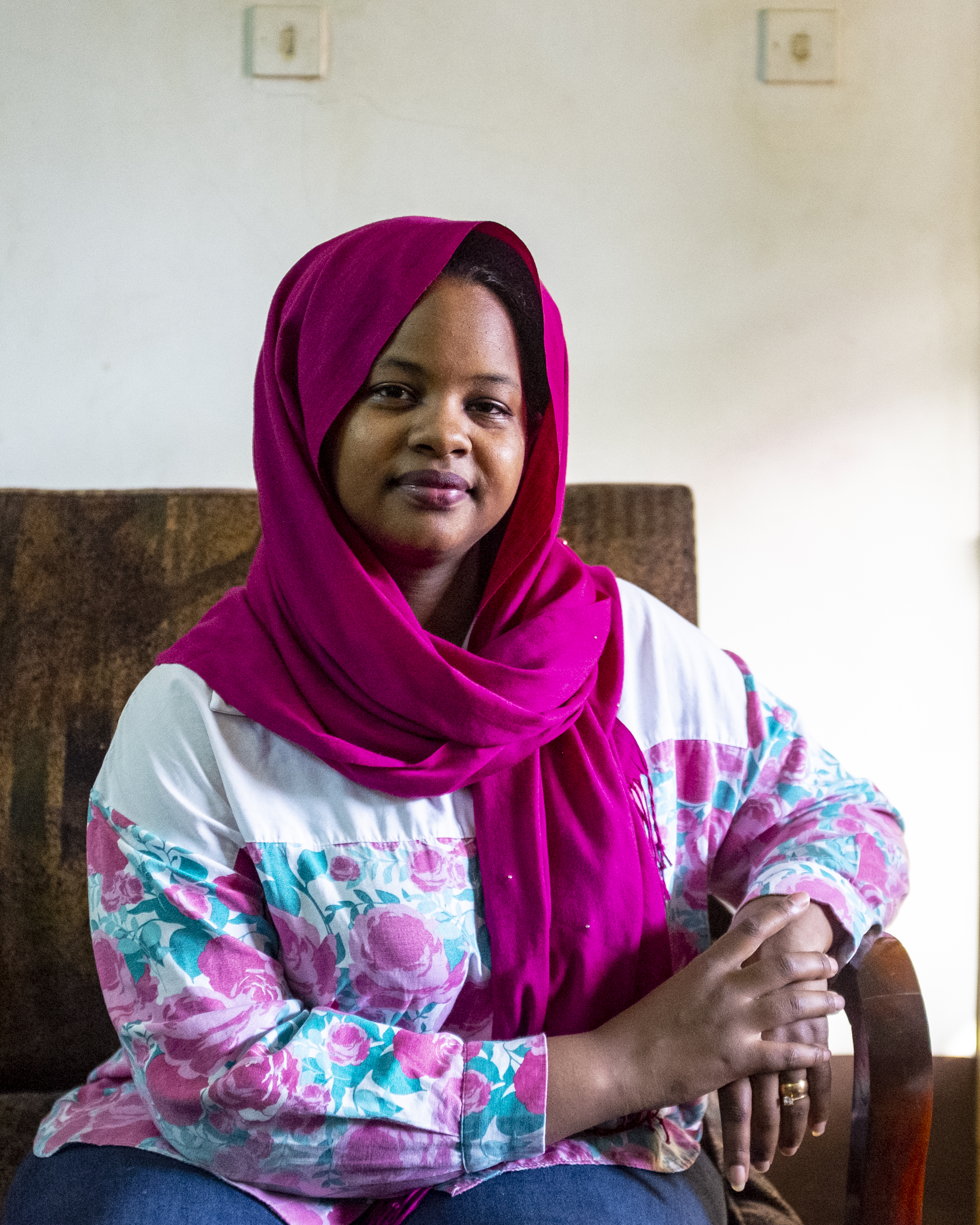
Sudanese climate activist Nisreen Elsaim (October 2022)

== Sri Lanka ==
- Michelle Dilhara (born 1996), actress and environmental activist
- Sevvandi Jayakody, conservationist and echinodermologist

== Sudan ==
- Nisreen Elsaim, youth climate activist and climate negotiator
- Balgis Osman-Elasha, climate scientist studying climate change in Africa

== Sweden ==
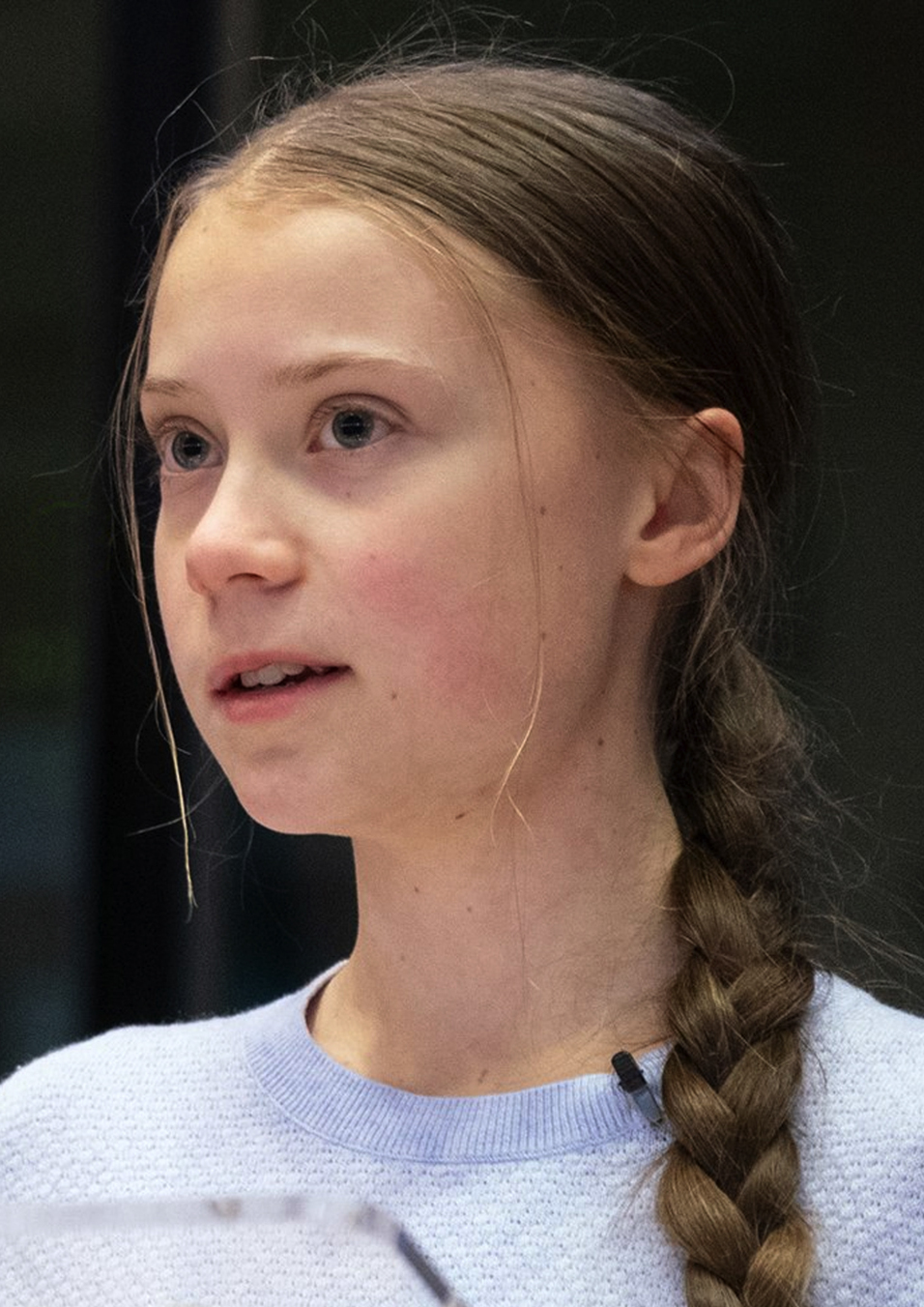
Swedish activist Greta Thunberg (March 2020)

- Isabelle Axelsson (born 2001), young climate activist
- Inger Holmlund (1927–2019), environmentalist active in tree-planting and craft projects for women in Kenya
- Greta Thunberg (born 2003), climate change activist beginning school climate strikes in 2018

== Switzerland ==
- Martine Rebetez (born 1961), climatologist working on the consequences of climate change in Switzerland
- Sonja Wipf (born 1973), plant ecologist studying climate change
- Anita Studer (born 1944), conservationist and ecologist

== Thailand ==
- Kotchakorn Voraakhom (born 1981), landscape architect contributing to projects addressing climate change

== Trinidad and Tobago ==
- Rahanna Alicia Juman (fl. 2000s), environmental researcher

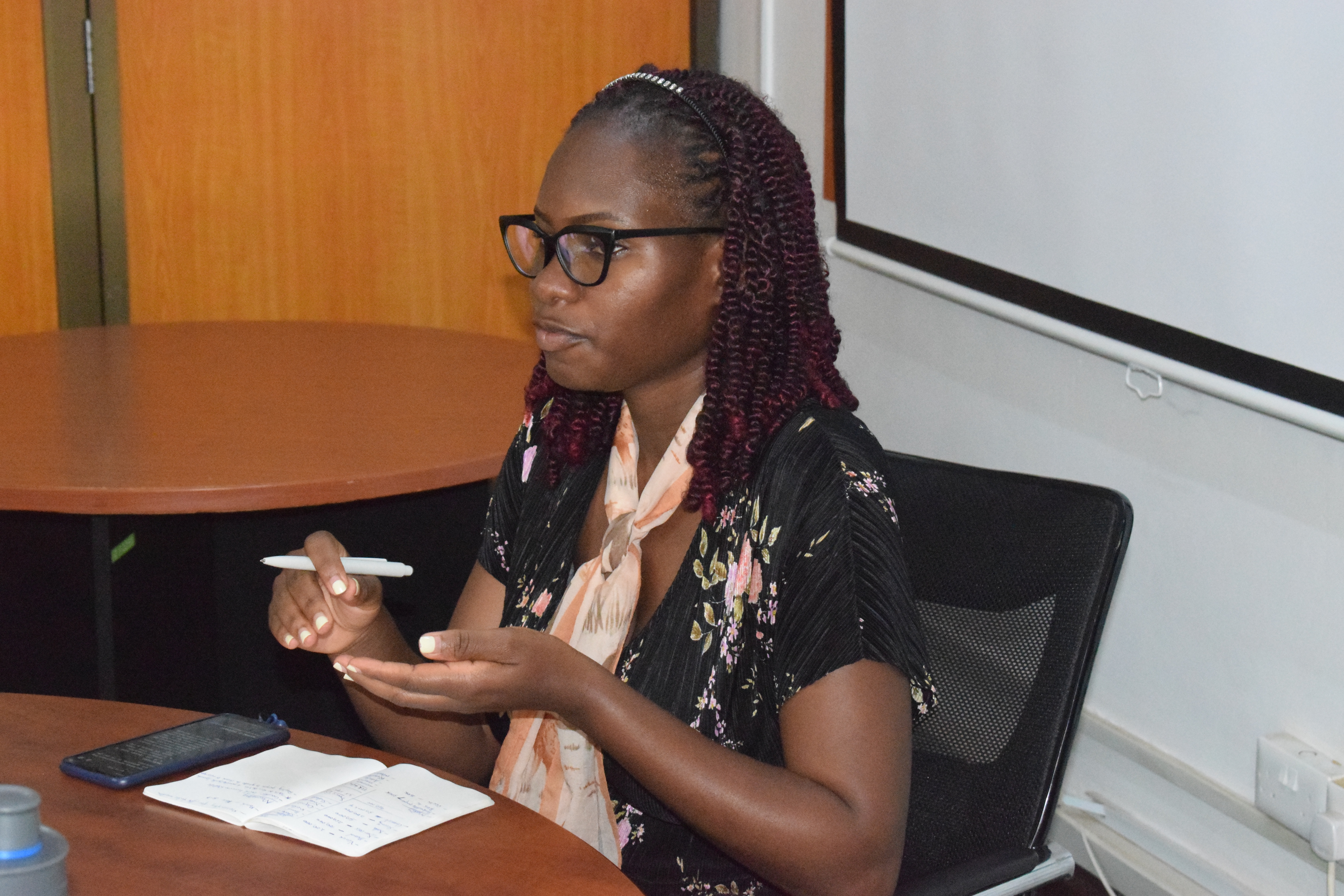
Ugandan youth climate activist Hilda Flavia Nakabuye (April 2022)

== Uganda ==
- Evelyn Acham (born 1991), climate justice activist and coordinator of the Rise Up movement
- Hilda Flavia Nakabuye (born 1997), youth climate and environmental rights activist, founder of Fridays for Future Uganda movement
- Vanessa Nakate (born 1996), youth climate justice activist and founder of the Rise Up movement
- Leah Namugerwa (born 2004), youth climate activist

== United Kingdom ==
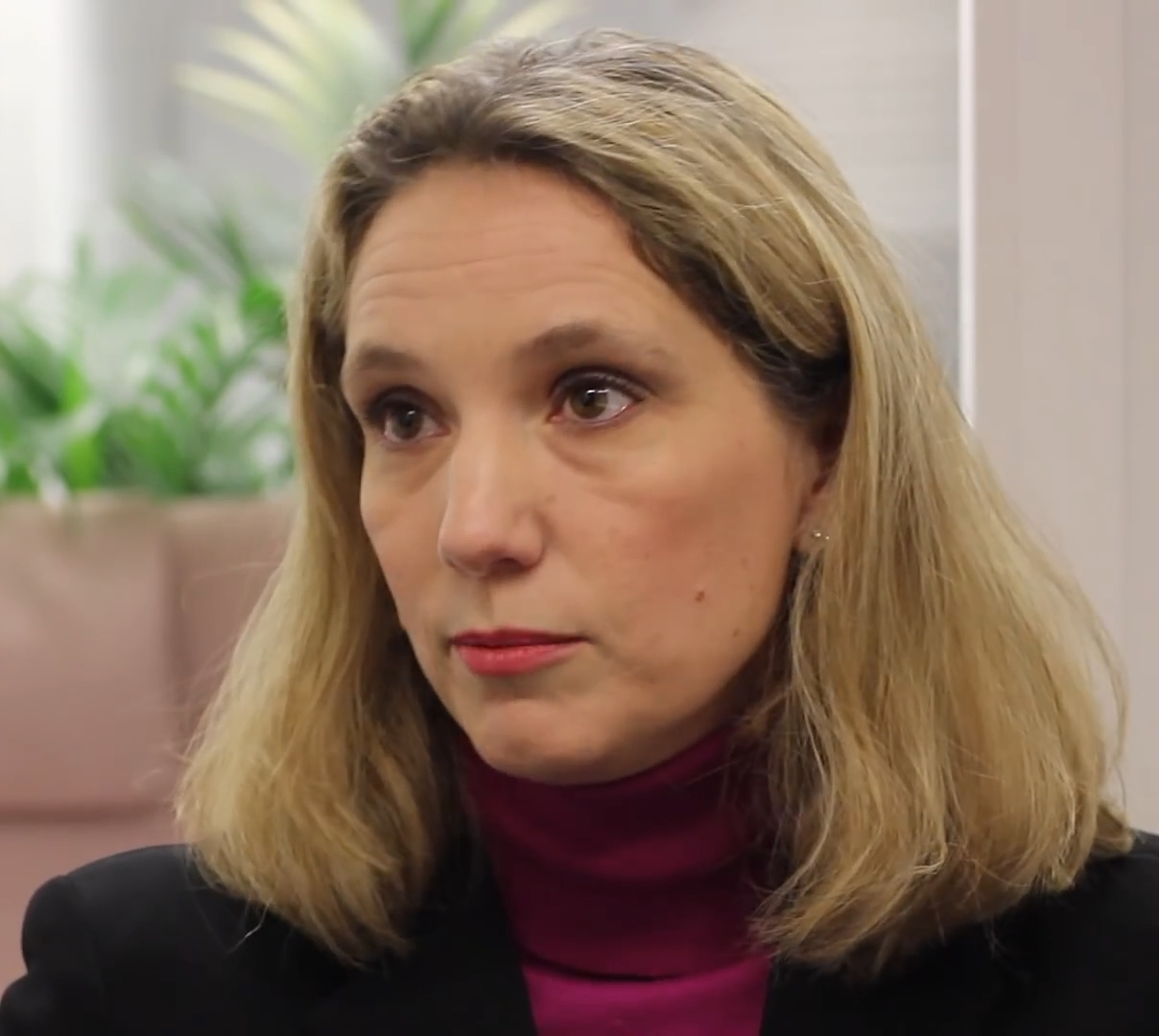
Emily Shuckburgh, British climate science communicator (2017)

- Helen ApSimon (born 1942), air pollution scientist
- Sarah Martha Baker (1887–1917), botanist and ecologist
- Brenda Boardman (born 1943), domestic energy efficiency and fuel poverty researcher and campaigner
- Judith Bunbury (born 1967), geoarchaeologist
- Tamsin Edwards, climate scientist, popular communicator
- Hayley Fowler, research focused on climate change and variability on hydrological and water resource systems
- Katharine Giles (1978–2013), climate scientist researching sea ice cover, ocean circulation and wind patterns
- Jean Grove (1927–2001), glaciologist; the Little Ice Age
- Joanna Haigh (born 1954), atmospheric physicist, Co-Director of Grantham Institute at Imperial College London, solar variability
- Gabriele C. Hegerl (born 1962), Professor of Climate System Science at the University of Edinburgh School of GeoSciences
- Helene Hewitt, Met Office researcher on ocean modeling
- Ellie Highwood, Professor of Climate Physics at the University of Reading
- Joanne Johnson (born 1977), geologist, Antarctic scientist
- Caroline King-Okumu, researcher focusing on dryland ecosystems, environmental assessment and climate change
- Rachel Kyte, international strategist on sustainable energy
- Sonya Legg, oceanographer studying ocean circulation processes
- Diana Liverman (born 1954), climate impacts, vulnerability and policy
- Georgina Mace (1953–2020), ecologist and conservation scientist
- Barbara Maher (born 1960), environmental scientist researching magnetic particles and pollution
- Stephanie Peay (born 1959), ecologist and crayfish researcher
- Jess Pepper, Scottish environmentalist and founder of the Climate Café initiative
- Vicky Pope, Head of the Climate Prediction Programme at the Hadley Centre for Climate Prediction and Research
- Paula Reimer, radiocarbon and archaeological scientist at the 14Chrono Centre for Climate
- Emily Shuckburgh, climate scientist, mathematician and science communicator
- Liz Thomas, paleoclimatologist, ice cores, British Antarctic Survey

== United States ==
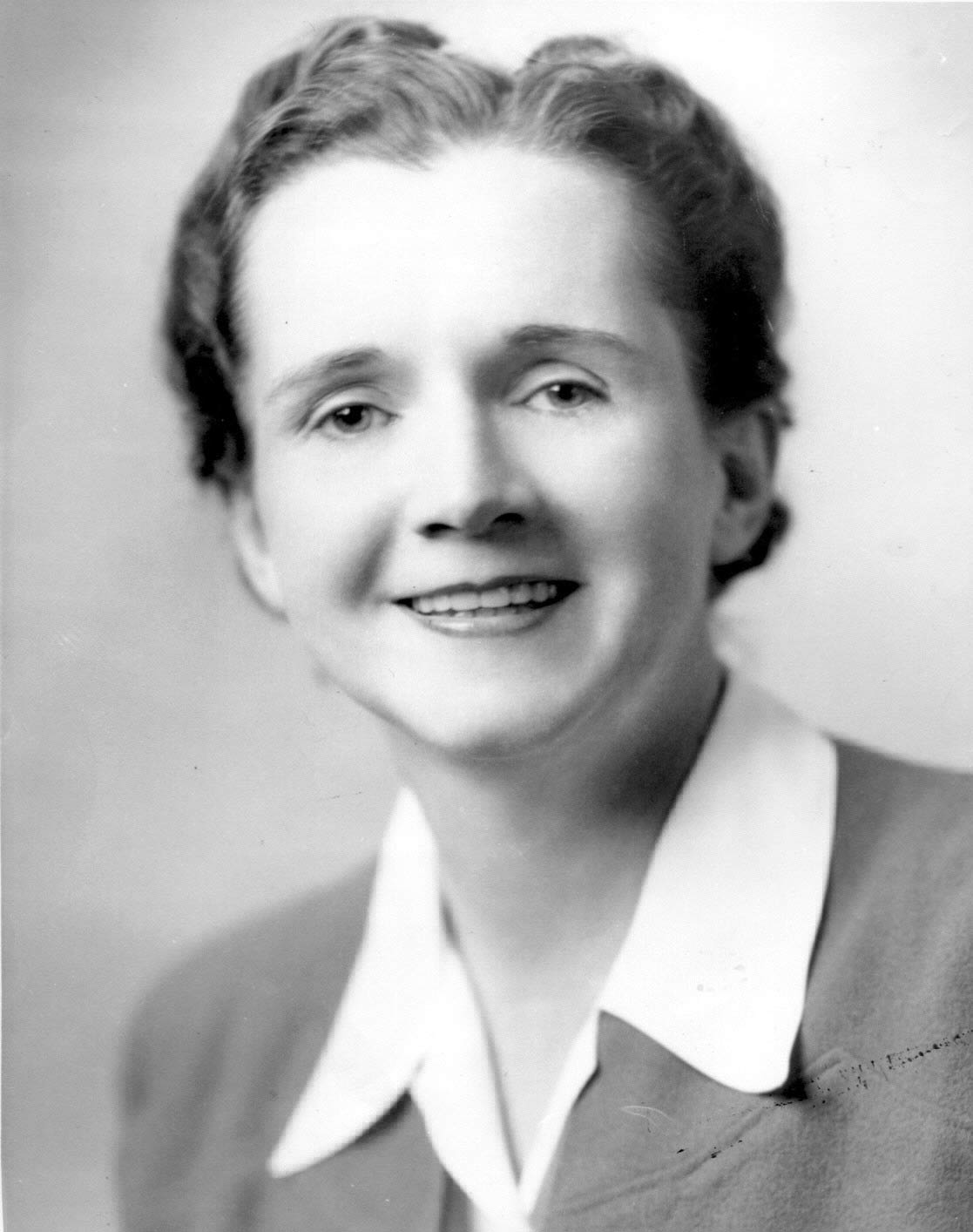
Rachel Carson, American marine biologist and conservationist

- Lydia Adams-Williams (1867–1928), writer focusing on conservation and deforestation
- Alice Alldredge, (born 1949) oceanographer and researcher of marine snow and demersal zooplankton
- Tanya Atwater (born 1942), marine geologist
- Thelma Babbitt (1906–2004), civil rights and environmental activist
- Sallie Baliunas (born 1953), retired astrophysicist active in global warming and climate research
- Lisa Beal, British-born oceanographer investigating the Agulhas current
- Barbara Bell (1922–2017), astronomer contributing to climate history
- Abigail Borah, environmental activist
- Florence Elfelt Bramhall (1862–1924), forest conservationist
- Emma Lucy Braun (1889–1971), botanist, ecologist and academic
- Margaret Bryan Davis (1931–2024), paleoecologist studying plant pollen
- Molly Burhans (born 1989), cartographer and environmental activist
- Elizabeth Canuel, chemical oceanographer investigating organic carbon cycling
- Rachel Carson (1907–1964), marine biologist and conservationist
- Jeannine Cavender-Bares (fl. 2000), evolutionary biologist
- Danielle Claar, marine scientist studying effect of climate on coral symbionts and parasites
- Amy C. Clement, atmospheric and marine scientist modelling climate change
- Kim Cobb (born 1974), climate scientist studying oceanography
- Lisa Goddard (1966–2022), climate scientist focused on weather forecasting
- Emma Cole (1845–1910), botanist
- Maureen Conte, biogeochemist studying long-term cycling of chemical compounds in seawater
- Allison Crimmins, head of the National Climate Assessment
- Heidi Cullen, meteorologist, chief scientist for Climate Central
- Judith Curry, climatologist and former chair of the School of Earth and Atmospheric Sciences at the Georgia Institute of Technology
- Rosanne D'Arrigo, climate researcher using dendrochronology
- Kendra Daly, oceanographer specializing in zooplankton
- Violet Dandridge (1878–1956), Smithsonian scientific illustrator
- Lesley-Ann L. Dupigny-Giroux, Trinidad-born geographer and climate researcher, now in Vermont
- Sylvia Earle (born 1935), marine biologist
- Erika Edwards, researcher focusing on the evolution of plants
- Jane Fonda (born 1937), actress, feminist and environmentalist
- Eunice Newton Foote (1819–1888), scientist who discovered the effect of carbon dioxide on climate
- Grace Voss Frederick (1905–2009), actress later focusing on natural environmental preservation
- Daphne Frias (born 1998), activist focusing on gun control, climate change and environmental and disability justice
- Inez Fung (born 1949), climate modeling, biogeochemical cycles, and climate change
- Niria Alicia Garcia (born 1993), environmental activist
- Pat Gozemba (born 1940), LGBT activist focusing on the environment
- Marika Holland, scientist working on sea ice modelling
- Alice Clary Earle Hyde (1876–1943), botanical artist and conservationist
- Deborah Jacobvitz, ecologist
- Frances James (born 1930), ecologist and ornithologist
- Gretchen Keppel-Aleks, climate scientist researching greenhouse gases
- Caroline Ella Heminway Kierstead (1903–1985), geologist and micropaleontologist
- Bronwen Konecky, climatologist focusing on climate change in the tropics
- Winona LaDuke (born 1959), economist and environmentalist
- Estella Leopold (1927–2024), paleobotanist and conservationist
- Beate G. Liepert, research scientist focusing on climate variability
- Lorraine Lisiecki, paleoclimatologist studying the history of climate change
- Hunter Lovins (born 1950), environmentalist and sustainable proponent
- Jane Lubchenco (born 1947), environmentalist and marine biologist
- Cherilla Storrs Lowrey (1861–1918), founder of The Outdoor Circle, Hawaii's oldest environmental organization
- Kate Marvel, climate scientist, popular communicator
- Galen McKinley, carbon cycle researcher, studying the interface between the ocean and the atmosphere
- Marcia McNutt (born 1952), geophysicist, president of the National Academy of Sciences
- Linda Mearns, geologist and climate scientist specializing in climate change assessment
- Susanne Menden-Deuer (fl. 2000s), ecologist and oceanographer
- Jill Mikucki, microbiologist, Antarctic researcher
- Twila Moon, scientist researching the Greenland ice sheet
- Marianne V. Moore, aquatic ecologist
- Sue Moore, Arctic oceanographer studying whales
- Ann Haven Morgan (1882–1966), zoologist and ecologist
- Margaret Mulholland, oceanographer studying nutrients in marine environments
- Alison Murray, biochemist, Antarctic researcher
- Margaret Nygard (1925–1995), British-born educator and conservationist
- Karen Oberhauser (born 1956), conservation biologist working with monarch butterflies
- Kittie Fenley Parker (1910–1994), botanical researcher and illustrator
- Mary Peltola (fl. 1999), indigenous politician and environmentalist
- Elsie Quarterman (1910–2014), plant ecologist
- Marilyn Raphael, Trinidad-born climate change scientist working on polar research
- Cicely Ridley (1927–2008), British-born mathematician focused on climate modelling
- Edith A. Roberts (1881–1977), pioneering plant ecologist
- Gabrielle Rocap (born 1971), marine biologist investigating marine bacteria and phytoplankton
- Joan Roughgarden (born 1946), ecologist and evolutionary biologist
- Cynthia E. Rosenzweig (born 1958), climatologist, pioneered the study of climate change and agriculture
- Joellen Louise Russell (born 1970), oceanographer and climate scientist
- Tatiana Rynearson, oceanographer studying plankton diversity
- Eva Saulitis (1963–2016), marine biologist and writer
- Susan Seacrest (born 1953), environmental activist and founder of the Groundwater Foundation
- Sybil P. Seitzinger, oceanographer and climate scientist researching climate change and elemental cycling, especially nitrogen biogeochemistry
- Susan Solomon (born 1956), research in chlorofluorocarbons and ozone depletion
- Margaret Sordahl (1906–1995), ornithologist at the Smithsonian Astrophysical Observatory
- Lynne Talley, oceanographer and climate scientist at Scripps Institution of Oceanography
- Elizabeth Teter Lunn (1904–1998), biologist and ecologist
- Ellen Thomas (born 1950), Dutch-born environmental scientist specializing in marine micropaleontology and paleoceanography
- Anne M. Thompson, specialist in atmospheric chemistry and climate change
- LuAnne Thompson, oceanographer modeling movement of heat and chemical via ocean currents
- Vivian Thomson (fl 1997), environmental policy academic
- Maya Tolstoy, marine geophysicist investigating earthquakes in the deep sea
- Susan Trumbore, earth systems scientist focusing on the carbon cycle and its effects on climate
- Monica Turner (fl. 1980s), ecologist specializing in forest fires
- Julienne Stroeve, polar climate scientist working on the remote sensing of ice and snow
- Carol Van Strum (born 1940), environmentalist fighting against the use of pesticides
- Catherine Colello Walker, glaciologist working at Woods Hole Oceanographic Institute
- Betsy Weatherhead, former head of the National Climate Assessment
- Rebecca Woodgate, oceanographer working on ocean circulation in polar regions
- Elizabeth Yeampierre, attorney and environmental activist
- Kakani Katija Young, bioengineer focusing on marine organisms
- Linda Zall, environmental scientist specializing in satellite data
- Joy Zedler (born 1943), restoration and wetland ecologist

== Uruguay ==
- Lucrecia Covelo (1920–2000), entomologist and conservationist

== Vanuatu ==
- Litiana Kalsrap (born 1992), climate activist

== Vietnam ==
- Hoang Thi Than, geological engineer and archaeologist

== See also ==
- List of climate scientists
- Women in climate change
