= Overhauser =

Overhauser may refer to:

- Albert Overhauser (1925–2011), American physicist
- Chad Overhauser (born 1975), American football player
- Nuclear Overhauser effect, physics concept

== See also ==
- Oberhauser
