= Eric Guilyardi =

Eric Guilyardi is a climate scientist, professor in the department of meteorology at the University of Reading and directeur de recherche CNRS at LOCEAN at Institute Pierre Simon Laplace (IPSL) in Paris. He is an expert of the El Niño phenomenon. He has been a Lead Author for the IPCC AR5 report.
