= Augustenborg =

Augustenborg may refer to:

- Augustenborg, Denmark
- Augustenborg Municipality
- Augustenborg, Malmö
- Augustenburg Castle, eastern Karlsruhe, Germany
- Augustenborg Palace

== People ==
- Cara Augustenborg, Irish and American environmental scientist
