= Oberhauser =

Oberhauser is a German surname. Notable people with the surname include:

- August Oberhauser (1895–1971), Swiss footballer
- David Oberhauser (born 1989), French footballer
- Josef Oberhauser (1915–1979), German Nazi SS concentration camp commandant and Holocaust perpetrator
- Josef Oberhauser (bobsleigh) (born 1949), Austrian bobsledder
- Karen Oberhauser (born 1956), American conservation biologist
- Sabine Oberhauser (1963–2017), Austrian physician and politician

== Fictional characters ==
- Franz Oberhauser, fictional character also known as Ernst Stavro Blofeld
