= Anna Kernahan =

Climate activist

- Born: July 25, 2002 (age 23)
- Occupation: Climate activist

Anna Kernahan is a climate, ecological, social justice and human rights activist, and founder of Fridays for Future Northern Ireland. From Belfast, Northern Ireland, they (Note: Anna Kernahan uses they/them pronouns.) are also a writer. They protest every Friday to acknowledge climate change, as part of Fridays For Future, a global climate strike movement.

== Early life ==
Kernahan was born on 25 July 2002. According to them, at a young age, Kernahan had already a passion for nature being interested in ecology and wildlife and loving being in nature, going on walks through the hills and reading nature encyclopedias. On 2019, on the age of 16, after reading about Greta Thunberg, Fridays For Future and reports concerning the environment such as the 2018 IPCC special report, Kernahan became concerned with the climate emergency believing that the educational system is not teaching with enough significance about the climate crisis and that politicians are not totally aware of the crisis. So, they started raising awareness about the pollution impact by making scientific data on this topic known and protesting, fighting and demanding the politicians to act on the climate crisis.

== Activism ==
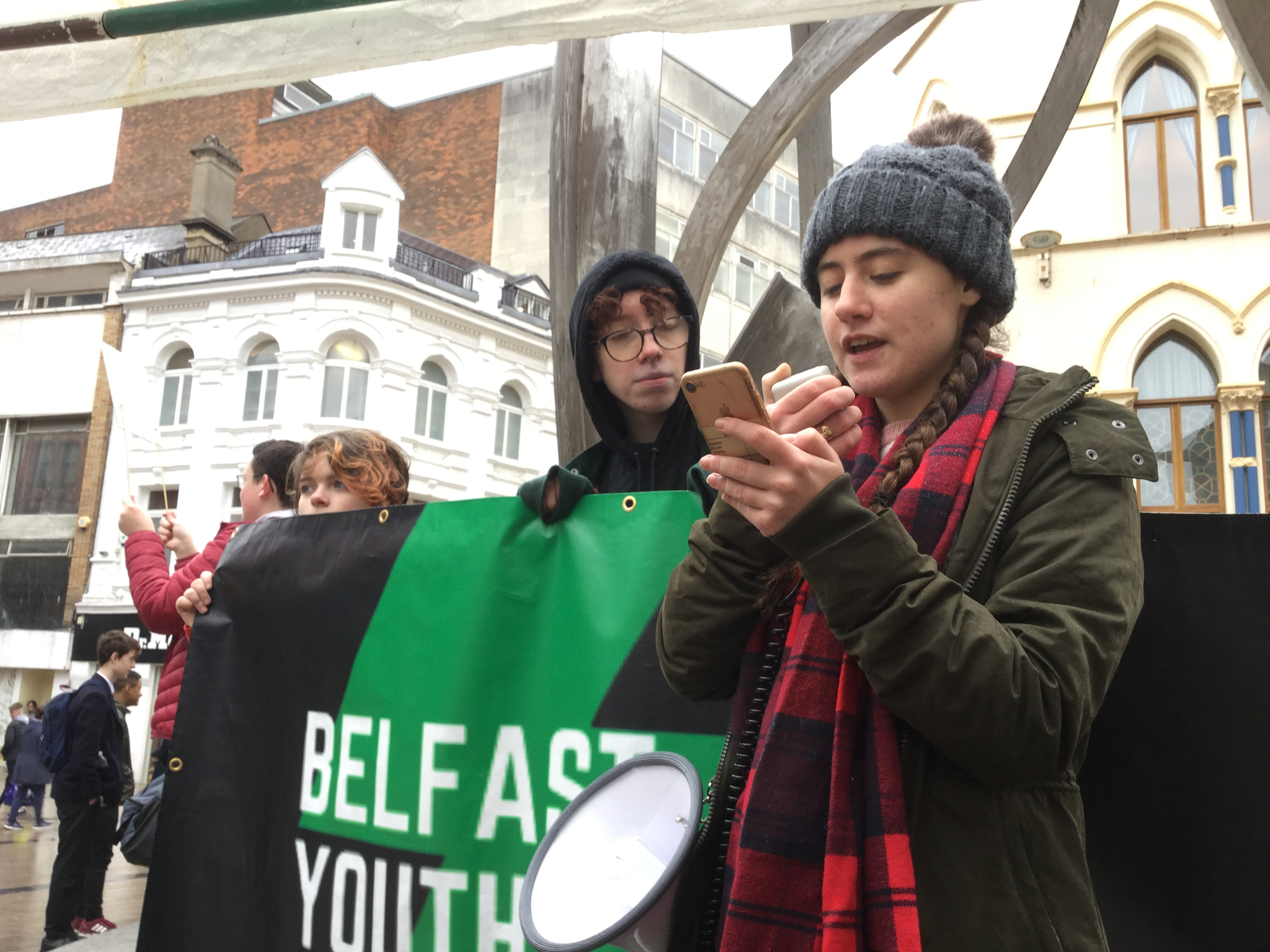
Anna Kernahan striking, as part of the Youth Strike 4 Climate movement.

According to them, Kernahan started as a social justice activist when they were 13 years old.

Then, on 2019, they decided to school strike for the environment, although their school didn't support the idea of school striking and only let them do it with a few restricitions. Firstly, in May 2019, Kernahan joined the Northern Ireland Students' Climate Network, the Youth Strike 4 Climate branch of Northern Ireland, striking monthly. Then, in September 2019, they created Fridays For Future Northern Ireland, the national Northern Irish section of Friday For Future protesting and raising awareness about climate change every Friday.

Thus, Kernahan has been school striking every Friday without any exception on the sculpture Spirit of Belfast, protesting frequently alone. Besides remonstrating for the environment, they write poems, their thoughts on the environmental problems and their experiences as an activist and often make art to concern people about the pollution and other climate problems, specially directed to politicians and governments.

=== Solo But Not Alone ===
In December 2019, Kernahan and two friends, Grace Maddrell and Helen Jackson, created a Twitter page, called Solo Not Alone, with the purpose of sharing stories of solo climate strikes.

=== Campaign #LearnMoreOutdoors ===
On 3 March 2020, Ulster Wildlife and its Our Bright Future Youth Advocate launched a campaign called #LearnMoreOutdoors to celebrate World Wildlife Day. Kernahan participated in this movement by helping in its series of videos about the advantages of outdoor schooling and giving their opinion about the subject.

=== TED-Talk ===
On 14 March 2020, Kernahan had a TED-Talk where they and another young climate activist, Kaitlyn Laverty, called the viewers to act and take the environmental problems seriously.

=== Amnesty Brave Award 2020 ===
In 2020, Kernahan won the Amnesty Brave Award 2020 as they had been striking for more than half a year when Ireland had very strict protesting laws.

=== Northern Ireland Science Festival ===
Between 15th to 28 February 2021, in the Northern Ireland Science Festival, Kernahan joined an inter-generational conversation on the key problems facing the planet and what is necessary to do in order to influence politicians and the public, named How to save the planet, . The conversation was presented in partnership with British Council Northern Ireland, included Jane Goodall and Tara Shine and was hosted by wildlife biologist Lizzie Daly.

== Criticism ==
Kernahan was criticised for only school striking for the environment so they could skip classes. They had stated in an interview that they hate striking and would prefer going to school, but they have no option as they felt it is their moral duty.
