= Nasrin Husseini =

Canadian refugee advocate

- Born: Afghanistan
- Education: Kabul University, University of Guelph
- Occupations: Refugee advocate, veterinary researcher, food activist
- Awards: 100 Women (BBC) (2021)

Nasrin Husseini is an Afghan-born Canadian advocate of refugees, veterinary researcher, and a food activist, working to remake the food system. Her research focuses on advancing animal health through breeding and improving the productivity of the food derived from farm animals.

== Biography ==
Afghan women and girls are terrified and the current situation seems hopeless, but there is always a way.

— Nasrin Husseini

Nasrin Husseini was born in Afghanistan and spent her childhood as a refugee in Iran. After the fall of the Taliban, she moved back to Afghanistan in 2004. She was in the second class of women to graduate from the veterinary medicine program at Kabul University in 2010.

In 2010, she relocated to Toronto, Canada as a refugee due to discrimination she experienced as an educated woman in Afghanistan, and she enrolled at University of Guelph. Her family joined her in Canada in 2018. She received a master of science degree in immunology in 2020 with her thesis Resilience of High Immune Responder Beef Cattle in the Context of Climate Change (2020). After graduation, Husseini began working for the University of Guelph as a veterinary researcher in the immunology lab.

In 2021, Husseini was volunteering for Hazara Humanitarian Services in Brampton, assisting the Hazara people from Afghanistan in settling in Canada; and for the Bookies Youth Program, promoting Afghan literacy and storytelling for children. That same year, she was included on the 100 Women BBC list.

== See also ==
- List of women climate scientists and activists
