= Pascale Braconnot =

Climate scientist

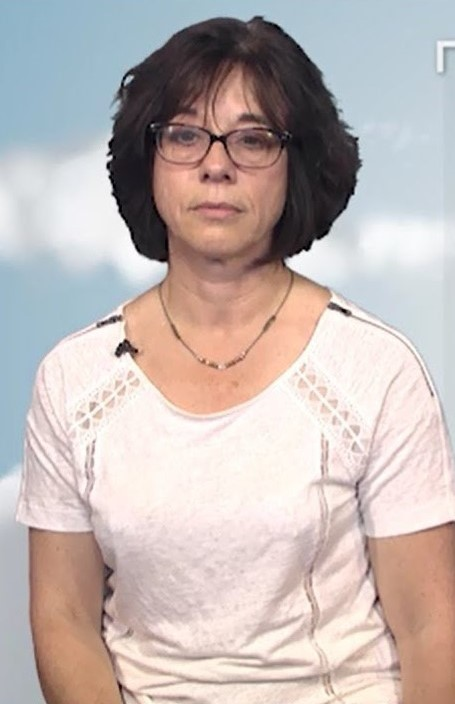
- Braconnot in 2016
- Awards: Legion d'honneur (2012)
- Scientific career
- Workplaces: Institute Pierre Simon Laplace

Pascale Braconnot (French: [paskal bʁakɔnɔ]) is a Climate Scientist in the Climate and Environmental Sciences at the Institute Pierre Simon Laplace. She was involved in writing the IPCC Fourth and Fifth Assessment Reports.

== Early life and education ==
During her doctoral studies Braconnot worked on tropic ocean models using statistical methods. She is interested in the amplification of Asian and African monsoons during the holocene. Braconnot was one of the first to use a three-dimensional coupled ocean model to show the importance of ocean feedback in glacial inception. She has worked on El Niño and the Holocene insolation. In 1992 she was appointed a French Alternative Energies and Atomic Energy Commission.

== Research and career ==
Braconnot is a Professor of Climate Change at the Institute Pierre Simon Laplace. She is a member of the Modelling the Earth Response to Multiple Anthropogenic Interactions and Dynamics (MERMAID) group. Her work considers ocean-atmosphere coupling, ocean acidification and climate simulations. Braconnot studies past climates to better understand the role of climate feedback. She has also worked on axial tilt and precession during interglacial period. Braconnot has been involved with the Paleoclimate Modelling Intercomparison Project, which analyses climate model outputs.

In 2014 Braconnot was awarded a €2.7 million grant from the BNP Paribas foundation for climate research. She was involved with the IPCC Fourth and Fifth Assessment Reports. She was selected to be involved with the IPCC Sixth Assessment Report scoping meeting in 2017. In 2017 Braconnot signed a letter to Emmanuel Macron to express concern about France withdrawing from nuclear power. In 2019 Braconnot was elected as an Officer of the World Climate Research Programme Joint Scientific Committee.

=== Awards and honours ===
- 2009 European Geosciences Union Milankovich Medal
- 2012 Legion d'honneur
- 2015 Elected to the Academia Europaea
