= Paca Blanco =

Spanish feminist

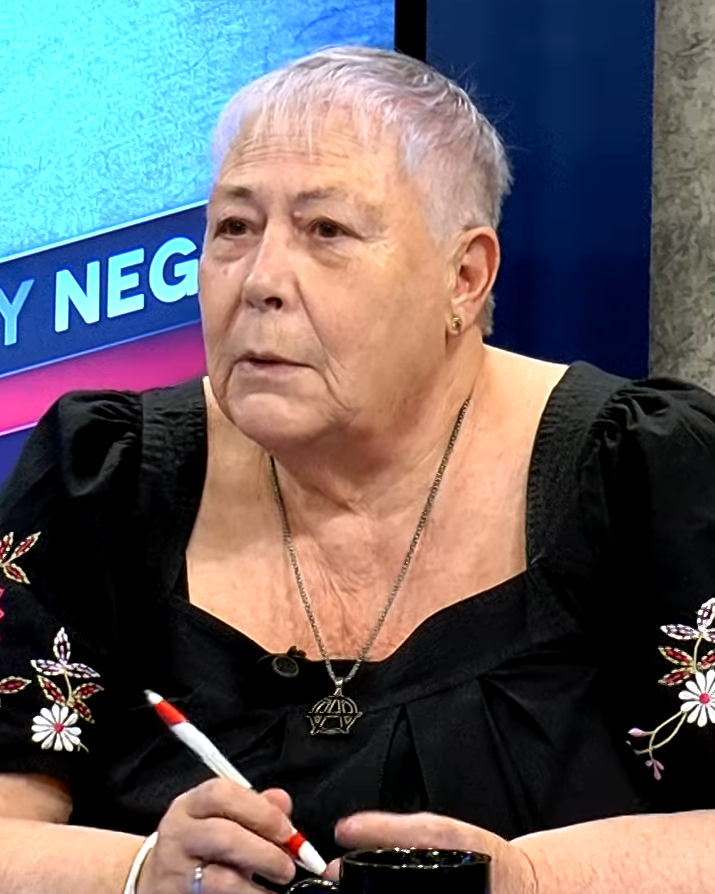
- Blanco in 2022
- Born: Francisca Blanco Díaz; 13 February 1949 (age 77); Madrid, Spain
- Occupations: Environmentalist; women's rights activist

Francisca "Paca" Blanco Díaz (born 13 February 1949) is a Spanish feminist, environmentalist, anti-fascist, anti-nuclear, anti-capitalist and pensioner. She was one of the founders of Ecologists in Action and is part of the Plataforma de Afectados por la Hipoteca, amongst others.

== Biography ==
Francisca Blanco Díaz was born in Madrid on 13 February 1949. Her father was a Republican political prisoner who was in a concentration camp almost until he died. When he died, she was 16. She graduated from school when she was already the mother of 5 children. For her, life is a university that teaches those who want to learn and she read a lot. In her youth, she went looking for forbidden books by Karl Marx, Leon Trosky and Friedrich Engels. She read and thought about all the injustices her father suffered, and what she had seen and suffered herself in reform schools. The ability to relate what she read with what she saw around her is for her the basis of culture. She has lived in several Spanish towns and had an "irregular" working life, having to work as much as she could, without looking at the quality of the work because she had to support her children.
