= Helen Plume =

New Zealand climate change expert

Helen Plume CNZM
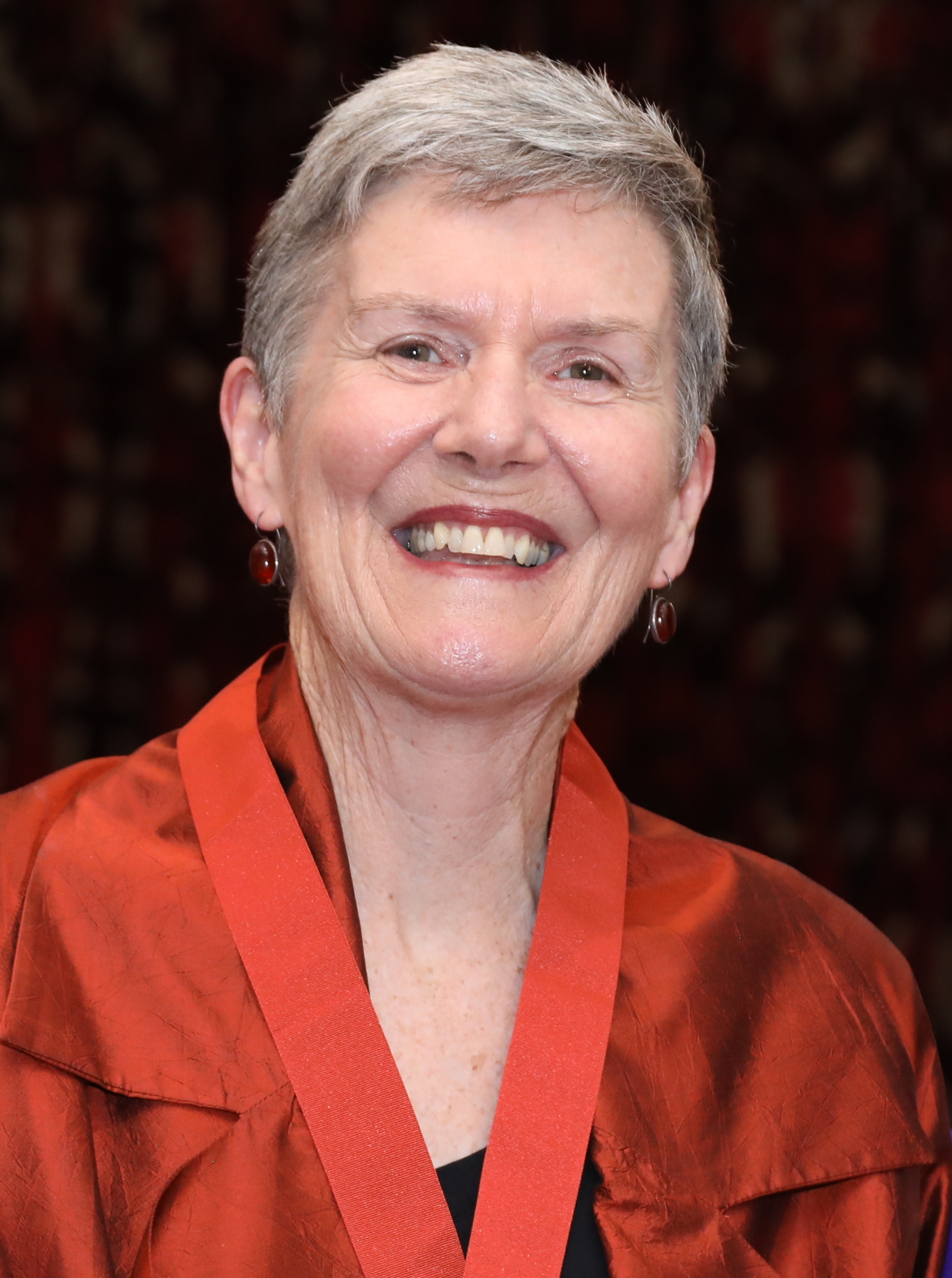
- Plume at her investiture in October 2020
- Employer: Ministry for the Environment

Helen Joan Plume CNZM is a climate change expert and senior New Zealand public servant in the Ministry for the Environment. She has represented New Zealand as a negotiator at many United Nations Climate Change Conferences.

== Career ==
Plume joined the Ministry for the Environment in the mid-1980s. She has represented New Zealand as a negotiator and contributed to climate change agreements, such as the Kyoto Protocol and COP 26.

In 2008 Plume was elected to serve a two-year term as chair of the United Nations Framework Convention on Climate Change's Subsidiary Body for Scientific and Technological Advice and was the first New Zealander to fill this position. The then minister for climate change, David Parker, acknowledged her "exceptional ability" when he announced her appointment.

In the 2020 New Year Honours, Plume was appointed a Companion of the New Zealand Order of Merit, for services to the environment.

As of October 2020 she was chair of the Climate Change Experts Group, a collaboration between the OECD and the International Energy Agency.
