= Zuhal Atmar =

Afghan environmentalist and businessperson

- Occupation: Entrepreneur
- Known for: Environmental activism

Zuhal Atmar is an Afghan entrepreneur and environmentalist. She is noted for her pioneering work as the first woman who owned and ran a recycling plant in Afghanistan. Atmar is also a researcher and an economic affairs analyst. She was among the BBC's 2021 list of 100 inspiring women.

== Biography ==
Atmar was born in Afghanistan. An account cited that she was a refugee in Pakistan, where she completed her education. She came back to Afghanistan after the fall of the Taliban. She started her career as a researcher. During her work for the Afghanistan Research and Evaluation Unit, she was involved in promoting women's education, community voice, equal opportunities, and access to livelihood.

== Activism ==
Atmar's environmental work began with her desire to help address climate change. She established a recycling plant to contribute to mitigating pollution in Kabul. In an interview, she cited single-use plastic as a contributor to the 308 tons of garbage generated in Kabul daily. This facility called Gul-Mursal Waste Paper Recycling Factory processed 33 tons of garbage per week.

Her work at the recycling facility exposed Atmar to gender discrimination and harassment. She stated that it was difficult to set up her company because women in Afghanistan do not have access to loans because they fail to complete requirements such as guarantor, business partner, and collateral. She was able to operate her company after securing a $100,000 loan from the United States Agency for International Development (USAID). Atmar also struggled with patriarchy. She claimed to have been harassed by male competitors. In a report, Atmar stated that “there’s a lot of judgment and many people are bothered by me running my own business.”

Atmar was included in BBC's list of 100 influential and inspiring women for 2021.
