= Aida Fernández Ríos =

Climate scientist, marine biologist

Dr. Aida Fernández Ríos
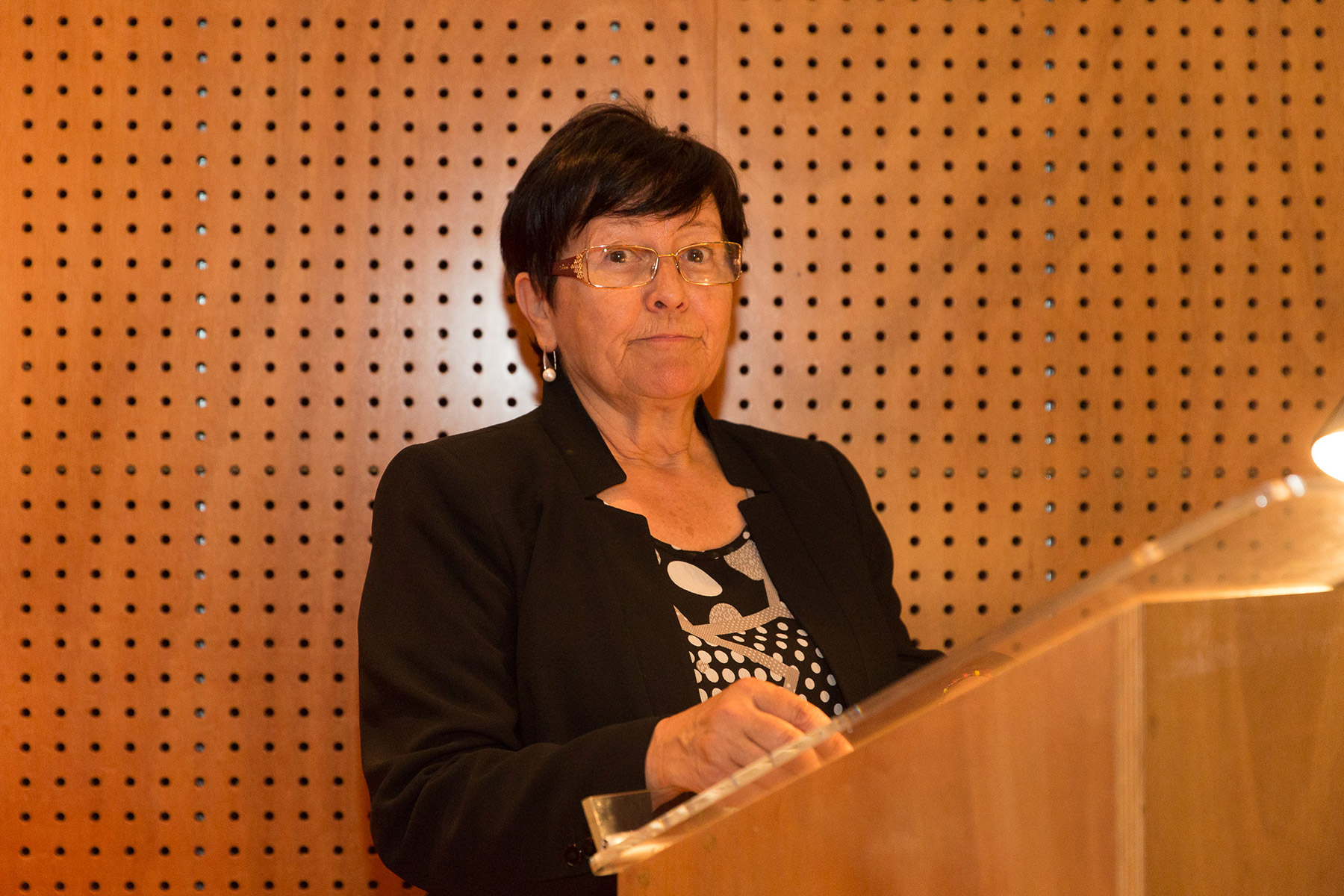
- Born: 4 March 1947
- Died: 22 December 2015 (aged 68); Moaña, Spain
- Education: Ph.D in Biology, University of Santiago (1992)
- Scientific career
- Fields: Climate science; Marine biology
- Institutions: Instituto de Investigaciones Marinas (IIM); Spanish National Research Council (CSIC); Royal Galician Academy of Sciences (RAGC)

Aida Fernández Ríos (4 March 1947 – 22 December 2015) was a climate scientist, marine biologist, and a professor at the Instituto de Investigaciones Marinas (IIM) in Spain, specializing in the study of the Atlantic Ocean. She was the director of the Spanish National Research Council (CSIC), and also a member of the Royal Galician Academy of Sciences (RAGC).

== Biography ==
Fernández's research work in marine biology began in 1972 when she began working with the Instituto de Investigaciones Pesqueras (IIP) in Uruguay. She received her doctoral degree in biology in 1992 from the University of Santiago. From 2006 to 2011, Ríos was the director of the Spanish National Research Council, and she also led an International Geosphere-Biosphere Programme committee focused on studying climate change from 2005 to 2011. She was initiated into the Royal Galician Academy of Sciences on 6 June 2015, where she gave an inaugural speech on the increasing acidity of the Atlantic Ocean due to carbon dioxide titled, "Acidificación do Mar: Unha consecuencia das emisións de CO2."

Fernández died in a car accident in Moaña on 22 December 2015.

== Research ==
Fernández was considered "one of Europe's leading experts" on the relationship between carbon dioxide emissions and ocean acidity; she also investigated the ocean depth at which such changes in pH occur. Through her work, Ríos argued that observations of increased acidity in the Atlantic Ocean is best explained by changes in the accumulation of carbon dioxide produced by human activity rather than from natural sources.
