= Line Rochefort =

Canadian scientist

- Education: Laval University, University of Alberta, University of Cambridge
- Known for: peatland restoration
- Scientific career
- Fields: Biology
- Workplaces: Laval University

Line Rochefort is a Canadian scientist specializing in peatland ecology.

== Life ==
She grew up in a small town near Chicoutimi and earned a BSc in biology from Laval University, a MSc in botany from the University of Alberta and a PhD in botany from the University of Cambridge (1992). Her master's work included research into the impact of acid rain in Canada's Experimental Lakes Area. She is a professor in the Department of Plant Sciences at Laval University. Rochefort has held the Natural Sciences and Engineering Research Council's Industrial Research chair for Peatland Management since 2003.

She has worked with the Canadian peat industry on peatland restoration after extraction of peat has been completed in fens and bogs. In 2011, she received the International Peatland Society's Award of Excellence. In 2024, she received an Honorary Doctorate from the University of Eastern Finland.

== Research ==
She has written many peer-reviewed publications about peatland restoration.
