= Kendra Daly =

American oceanographer

- Education: University of Tennessee
- Scientific career
- Workplaces: University of South Florida
- Thesis: The influence of zooplankton on biogeochemical fluxes and stoichiometry in an Arctic marine system (1995)

Kendra Lee Daly is an oceanographer known for her work on zooplankton, particularly in low oxygen regions of the ocean. She is a professor at the University of South Florida, and an elected fellow of the American Association for the Advancement of Science.

== Education and career ==
Daly has a B.S. (1973) and a M.S. (1990) from the University of Washington. In 1995 she earned her Ph.D. from the University of Tennessee with a dissertation on zooplankton in the Arctic. Following her Ph.D. she did postdoctoral work at Oak Ridge National Laboratory and was a program director at the National Science Foundation. In 2001 she moved to the University of South Florida where she was promoted to professor in 2014.

== Research ==
Daly's early research was conducted in the Weddell Sea where she examined the abundance, growth, and feeding of krill. Subsequently she examined year-to-year changes in the development of krill in Antarctica, and the role of zooplankton in organic sulfur cycling in the Southern Ocean. She has examined how plankton production is impacted by physics and biology, such as her work looking at carbon and nitrogen cycling in polar regions. Following the Deepwater Horizon oil spill, Daly considered how the spill may have altered plankton production in the region, worked with a team tracking oil droplets in the water using automated image analysis, and assessed potential toxic effects of the oil on the biological community in the Gulf of Mexico.

== Selected publications ==
- Halpern, Benjamin S.; Longo, Catherine; Hardy, Darren; McLeod, Karen L.; Samhouri, Jameal F.; Katona, Steven K.; Kleisner, Kristin; Lester, Sarah E.; O’Leary, Jennifer; Ranelletti, Marla; Rosenberg, Andrew A. (2012-08-30). "An index to assess the health and benefits of the global ocean". Nature. 488 (7413): 615–620. Bibcode:2012Natur.488..615H. doi:10.1038/nature11397. ISSN 0028-0836. PMID 22895186. S2CID 3155170.
- Daly, Kendra L. (1990). "Overwintering development, growth, and feeding of larval Euphausia superba in the Antarctic marginal ice zone". Limnology and Oceanography. 35 (7): 1564–1576. Bibcode:1990LimOc..35.1564D. doi:10.4319/lo.1990.35.7.1564. ISSN 0024-3590.
- Daly, Kendra L.; Passow, Uta; Chanton, Jeffrey; Hollander, David (2016-03-01). "Assessing the impacts of oil-associated marine snow formation and sedimentation during and after the Deepwater Horizon oil spill". Anthropocene. 13: 18–33. Bibcode:2016Anthr..13...18D. doi:10.1016/j.ancene.2016.01.006. ISSN 2213-3054.
- Daly, Kendra L.; Macaulay, Michael C. (1988-01-01). "Abundance and distribution of krill in the ice edge zone of the Weddell Sea, austral spring 1983". Deep Sea Research Part A. Oceanographic Research Papers. 35 (1): 21–41. Bibcode:1988DSRA...35...21D. doi:10.1016/0198-0149(88)90055-6. ISSN 0198-0149.
- Daly, Kendra L.; Macaulay, Michael C. (1991). "Influence of physical and biological mesoscale dynamics on the seasonal distribution and behavior of Euphausia superba in the antarctic marginal ice zone". Marine Ecology Progress Series. 79 (1/2): 37–66. Bibcode:1991MEPS...79...37D. doi:10.3354/meps079037. ISSN 0171-8630. JSTOR 44634786.

== Awards and honors ==
In 2015 Daly was named a fellow of the American Association for the Advancement of Science.
