= Vivian Thomson =

American environmental policy academic

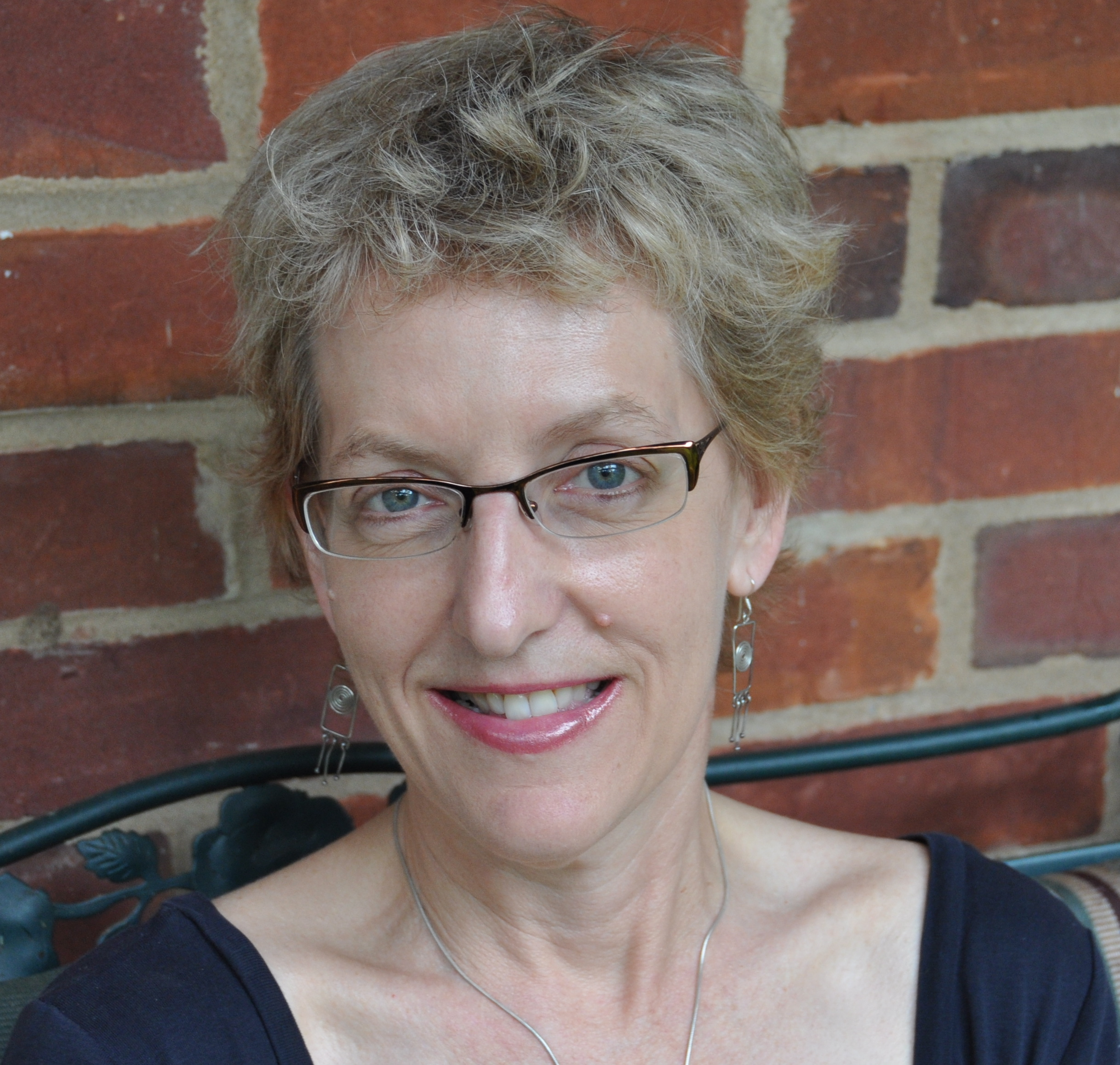
- Thomson in 2009
- Occupation: Environmental policy academic
- Awards: PROSE Award (2018)

Academic background
- Education: Princeton University; University of California, Santa Barbara; University of Virginia

Academic work
- Discipline: Environmental policy and politics
- Institutions: University of Virginia College of Arts and Sciences

Vivian E. Thomson has been an American environmental policy academic, a public official, and a podcast producer. She was a professor at the University of Virginia College of Arts and Sciences from 1997 to 2017. She has produced The Meaning of Green podcast since 2019.

== Life ==
Thomson completed an A.B. in biology at Princeton University. She earned an M.A. in biology from the University of California, Santa Barbara. Thomson completed a Ph.D. in government from the University of Virginia.

Thomson was a senior air pollution analyst and manager at the United States Environmental Protection Agency. From 1997 to 2017 she was a professor in the Departments of Environmental Sciences and Politics at the University of Virginia College of Arts and Sciences. She co-founded and directed the interdisciplinary Environmental Thought and Practice B.A. Program.

Appointed by Virginia governor Mark Warner in 2002, Thomson served as Vice Chair and member of the State Air Pollution Control Board, a seven-member regulatory body that makes air pollution policy and approves regulations for Virginia. She was reappointed by governor Tim Kaine and served on the Board until 2010.

In 2018, Thomson's book, Climate of Capitulation, won a PROSE Award in the politics and government category.

== Selected works ==
- Thomson, Vivian E. (2009). Garbage In, Garbage Out: Solving the Problems with Long-Distance Trash Transport. University of Virginia Press. ISBN 978-0-8139-2824-1.
- Thomson, Vivian E. (2014). Sophisticated Interdependence in Climate Policy: Federalism in the United States, Brazil, and Germany. Anthem Press. ISBN 978-1-78308-110-3.
- Thomson, Vivian E. (2017). Climate of Capitulation: An Insider's Account of State Power in a Coal Nation. MIT Press. ISBN 978-0-262-03634-4.
