= Paola Arias =

Colombian climate scientist

Paola Andrea Arias Gómez
- Born: Medellín, Colombia
- Education: National University of Colombia (BSc, MSc) Georgia Institute of Technology (MSc), University of Texas (PhD)
- Occupation: Climate scientist
- Employer: University of Antioquia
- Notable work: IPCC Sixth Assessment Report - Lead author on Water Cycle Changes chapter

Paola Andrea Arias Gómez is a Colombian climate scientist and professor at the Environmental School of the University of Antioquia (Colombia). Her research includes different aspects of climate change and hydroclimate modeling in Colombia and South America. Arias is the first Colombian woman to be selected as an author for an IPCC report, participating as lead author for Working Group I of the IPCC Sixth Assessment Report.

== Career ==
Arias has a BS in civil engineering and an MSc in hydric resources from the National University of Colombia. In 2008 she went on to obtain a second MSc in earth and atmospheric sciences from the Georgia Institute of Technology, with a thesis titled "Changes in cloudiness over tropical land during the last decades and its link to global climate change". In 2011, Arias obtained a PhD in geological sciences from the University of Texas under the guidance of Rong Fu, with a dissertation titled "Climate variability over the American monsoon and Amazonian regions during the last decades". She joined the department of geophysics at the University of Chile as a postdoctoral researcher for the Center of Excellence for Research on Climate and Resilience, where Arias continued her work on American monsoon systems.

Arias is a professor at the University of Antioquia and leads the university's Environmental School, where she is also associated to the Environmental Engineering and Management Research Group. She participated in the TED independent event "TEDxBogotaMujeres", where she talked about the climate crisis.

=== Memberships ===
- Working Group I of the IPCC, where she contributed to the chapter on water cycle changes of the IPCC Sixth Assessment Report.
- GEWEX Hydroclimatology Panel (GHP), a group that works to understand the physical, social and economical aspects of hydroclimate variations.
- World Climate Research Programme (WCRP), specifically the "WCRP Lighthouse Activity: My Climate Risk" group, which focuses on assessing climate change information and its effective delivery at a local scale.
- Programa Hidrológico Intergubernamental - Grupo de trabajo del PHI-LAC sobre la hidrogeomorfología de la cuenca Andino – Amazónica (Intergovernmental Hydrological Program - PHI-LAC working group on the hydrogeomorphology of the Andean-Amazon basin), which aims to research water-related disasters and hydrological changes, to support communities in the region.

== Selected publications ==
=== Journals ===
- Rong Fu, Lei Yin, Wenhong Li, Paola A. Arias, Robert E. Dickinson, Lei Huang, Sudip Chakraborty, Katia Fernandes, Brant Liebmann, Rosie Fisher, Ranga B. Myneni. 2013. Increased dry-season length over southern Amazonia in recent decades and its implication for future climate projection Proceedings of the National Academy of Sciences; 2013: 110(45): 18110–18115. doi:10.1073/pnas.1302584110
- Germán Poveda, Oscar J. Mesa, Luis F. Salazar, Paola A. Arias, Hernán A. Moreno, Sara C. Vieira, Paula A. Agudelo, Vladimir G. Toro, J. Felipe Alvarez. 2005. The diurnal cycle of precipitation in the tropical Andes of Colombia. Monthly Weather Review; 133(1), 228–240. doi:10.1175/MWR-2853.1
- Germán Poveda, Jaime I. Vélez, Oscar J. Mesa, Adriana Cuartas, Janet Barco, Ricardo I. Mantilla, John F. Mejía, Carlos D. Hoyos, Jorge M. Ramírez, Lina I. Ceballos, Manuel D. Zuluaga, Paola A. Arias, Blanca A Botero, María I Montoya, Juan D. Giraldo, Diana I Quevedo. 2007. Linking long-term water balances and statistical scaling to estimate river flows along the drainage network of Colombia. Journal of Hydrologic Engineering; 12(1): 4–13. doi:10.1061/(asce)1084-0699(2007)12:1(4)
- Paola A. Arias, J. Alejandro Martínez, Sara C. Vieira. 2015. Moisture sources to the 2010–2012 anomalous wet season in northern South America. Climate Dynamics; 45: 2861–2884. doi:10.1007/s00382-015-2511-7

=== Reports ===
- Douville, H., K. Raghavan, J. Renwick, R. P. Allan, P. A. Arias, M. Barlow, R. Cerezo-Mota, A. Cherchi, T. Y. Gan, J. Gergis, D. Jiang, A. Khan, W. Pokam Mba, D. Rosenfeld, J. Tierney, O. Zolina. 2021. Water Cycle Changes. In: Climate Change 2021: The Physical Science Basis. Contribution of Working Group I to the Sixth Assessment Report of the Intergovernmental Panel on Climate Change [Masson-Delmotte, V., P. Zhai, A. Pirani, S. L. Connors, C. Péan, S. Berger, N. Caud, Y. Chen, L. Goldfarb, M. I. Gomis, M. Huang, K. Leitzell, E. Lonnoy, J. B. R. Matthews, T. K. Maycock, T. Waterfield, O. Yelekçi, R. Yu and B. Zhou (eds.)]. Cambridge University Press.
- Arias, P. A., N. Bellouin, E. Coppola, R. G. Jones, G. Krinner, J. Marotzke, V. Naik, M. D. Palmer, G-K. Plattner, J. Rogelj, M. Rojas, J. Sillmann, T. Storelvmo, P. W. Thorne, B. Trewin, K. Achuta Rao, B. Adhikary, R. P. Allan, K. Armour, G. Bala, R. Barimalala, S. Berger, J. G. Canadell, C. Cassou, A. Cherchi, W. Collins, W. D. Collins, S. L. Connors, S. Corti, F. Cruz, F. J. Dentener, C. Dereczynski, A. Di Luca, A. Diongue Niang, F. J. Doblas-Reyes, A. Dosio, H. Douville, F. Engelbrecht, V. Eyring, E. Fischer, P. Forster, B. Fox-Kemper, J. S. Fuglestvedt, J. C. Fyfe, N. P. Gillett, L. Goldfarb, I. Gorodetskaya, J. M. Gutierrez, R. Hamdi, E. Hawkins, H. T. Hewitt, P. Hope, A. S. Islam, C. Jones, D. S. Kaufman, R. E. Kopp, Y. Kosaka, J. Kossin, S. Krakovska, J-Y. Lee, J. Li, T. Mauritsen, T. K. Maycock, M. Meinshausen, S-K. Min, P. M. S. Monteiro, T. Ngo-Duc, F. Otto, I. Pinto, A. Pirani, K. Raghavan, R. Ranasinghe, A. C. Ruane, L. Ruiz, J-B. Sallée, B. H. Samset, S. Sathyendranath, S. I. Seneviratne, A. A. Sörensson, S. Szopa, I. Takayabu, A-M. Treguier, B. van den Hurk, R. Vautard, K. von Schuckmann, S. Zaehle, X. Zhang, K. Zickfeld. 2021. Technical Summary. In: Climate Change 2021: The Physical Science Basis. Contribution of Working Group I to the Sixth Assessment Report of the Intergovernmental Panel on Climate Change [Masson-Delmotte, V., P. Zhai, A. Pirani, S. L. Connors, C. Péan, S. Berger, N. Caud, Y. Chen, L. Goldfarb, M. I. Gomis, M. Huang, K. Leitzell, E. Lonnoy, J. B. R. Matthews, T. K. Maycock, T. Waterfield, O. Yelekçi, R. Yu and B. Zhou (eds.)]. Cambridge University Press
