= Deborah Jacobvitz =

American ecologist

- Born: Albuquerque, New Mexico, USA
- Spouse: Jerry Manheimer (m. 1994)

Academic background
- Education: B.A., 1981, University of California, Berkeley; PhD., University of Minnesota
- Thesis: The early caregiver-child relationship and attention-deficit hyperactivity disorder in school children

Deborah Bea Jacobvitz is an American ecologist. She holds the Phyllis L. Richards Endowed Professorship at University of Texas at Austin.

== Early life ==
Jacobvitz was raised by mother Jeanne Jacobvitz and father Leonard Jacobvitz. She grew up in Albuquerque, New Mexico with three other siblings. She attended ElDorado High School and graduated with straight As.

== Career ==
After earning her PhD, Jacobvitz joined the Department of Human Ecology, Child Development and Family Relationships at the University of Texas at Austin as an assistant professor. In 2008, she was appointed the chairperson of the Department of Human Development and Family Sciences at the newly established School of Human Ecology.
