= Kirsten Zickfeld =

German climate physicist

- Education: Free University of Berlin (MSc), University of Potsdam (PhD)
- Known for: Contributions to the Intergovernmental Panel on Climate Change (IPCC) Special Report on Global Warming of 1.5 °C
- Scientific career
- Fields: Climate physics
- Workplaces: Simon Fraser University

Kirsten Zickfeld is a German climate physicist who is now based in Canada. She is a member of the United Nations' Intergovernmental Panel on Climate Change, and was one of the authors on the Intergovernmental Panel on Climate Change's (IPCC) Special Report on Global Warming of 1.5 °C (SR15).Zickfeld completed a Master of Science degree in physics at the Free University of Berlin in 1998, followed by a doctorate in physics at the University of Potsdam in 2004. (Note: The full official title of the report is "Global warming of 1.5 °C: an IPCC special report on the impacts of global warming of 1.5 °C above pre-industrial levels and related global greenhouse gas emission pathways, in the context of strengthening the global response to the threat of climate change, sustainable development, and efforts to eradicate poverty".)

== Research career ==
Zickfeld completed a Master of Science degree in physics at the Free University of Berlin in 1998, followed by a doctorate in physics at the University of Potsdam in 2004. Afterwards, Zickfield conducted postdoctoral climate research at the Potsdam Institute for Climate Impact Research, the University of Victoria and the Canadian Center for Climate Modeling and Analysis.

Since 2010, Zickfeld has been conducting research as a professor of climate science at the Simon Fraser University, in Burnaby, British Columbia. Her research involves various aspects of climate change, including mitigation strategies such as negative emission technologies. She was one of two Canadian authors, and one of 91 authors, on the Intergovernmental Panel on Climate Change's (IPCC) Special Report on Global Warming of 1.5 °C (SR15).

Zickfeld's research has been cited over 3,800 times, and has an h-index and i10-index of 30 and 44 respectively. She received a 2019 President’s Awards for Leadership in Sustainability from Simon Fraser University.

== Selected bibliography ==
- Matthews, H. Damon, Nathan P. Gillett, Peter A. Stott, and Kirsten Zickfeld. "The proportionality of global warming to cumulative carbon emissions." Nature. 2009.
- Eby, M., K. Zickfeld, A. Montenegro, D. Archer, K. J. Meissner, and A. J. Weaver. "Lifetime of anthropogenic climate change: millennial time scales of potential CO2 and surface temperature perturbations." Journal of Climate. 2009.
- Zickfeld, Kirsten, Michael Eby, H. Damon Matthews, and Andrew J. Weaver. "Setting cumulative emissions targets to reduce the risk of dangerous climate change." Proceedings of the National Academy of Sciences. 2009.
- Gillett, Nathan P., Vivek K. Arora, Kirsten Zickfeld, Shawn J. Marshall, and William J. Merryfield. "Ongoing climate change following a complete cessation of carbon dioxide emissions." Nature Geoscience. 2011.

=== The SR15 Report ===
IPCC, 2018: Global Warming of 1.5°C. An IPCC Special Report on the impacts of global warming of 1.5°C above pre-industrial levels and related global greenhouse gas emission pathways, in the context of strengthening the global response to the threat of climate change, sustainable development, and efforts to eradicate poverty [V. Masson-Delmotte, P. Zhai, H. O. Pörtner, D. Roberts, J. Skea, P.R. Shukla, A. Pirani, W. Moufouma-Okia, C. Péan, R. Pidcock, S. Connors, J. B. R. Matthews, Y. Chen, X. Zhou, M. I. Gomis, E. Lonnoy, T. Maycock, M. Tignor, T. Waterfield (eds.)].

- Report website, chapters I–V
- Summary for policymakers, 32 pp.
- Headline statements, 2 pp.
- Technical summary, 22 pp.
- FAQ, 24 pp.
- Glossary, 24 pp.
