= Sevidzem Ernestine Leikeki =

Climate change activist

Sevidzem Ernestine Leikeki (born 1985) is a climate activist from Cameroon and in 2021 was awarded as a BBC 100 Women, for "women who create lasting change". She is a climate and gender activist from the North-West region of Cameroon, and she is the founder of Cameroon Gender and Environment Watch. She has worked to stop child trafficking, in 2010, in the North West of Cameroon. She attended the United Nations Council of Parties Climate Change event as Glasgow, 2021, COP26, and won the Gender Just Climate Solutions prize for transformational solutions, in 2019 and also in 2021.

== Early life and career ==
Leikeki was born in 1985, and has four children. Her community is located in a forest and farmland area which supplies firewood, but experiences poverty. She is an activist working towards gender equity in environmental protection and empowerment of girls and women. Leikeki was awarded a bachelor's degree in common law from the University of Yaounde II.

Leikeki is a climate and gender activist, involved in climate activities that lead to economic benefits and opportunities as well as environmental education. This includes tree planting, education about beeswax extraction and making honey wine, as well as detergents and lotions from beeswax. She says "Honey equals income, equals jobs, equals gender equality, equals conservation". She works to empower girls and women to enable sustainable development.

By 2020, her organisation had planted 86,000 trees, for climate mitigation, as well as providing environmental education. Her project aims to advocate for women's and girls' socio-economic and environmental rights, and promoting women's voices. Cameroon Gender and Environment Watch (CAMGEW), her organisation, also helps women escape domestic violence, and has assisted 800 women.

== Media ==
Leikeki gave a TED talk in 2010, on "A 'forest generation', living in harmony with nature". She was a speaker at the Global Landscapes Forum, and has been in the media for her environmental and climate change work.

== Prizes and awards ==
- 2021 – BBC 100 Women.
- 2021 – Gender Just Climate Solutions winner.
- 2019 – Gender Just Climate Solutions winner.
