= Twila Moon =

Scientist

- Education: University of Washington
- Scientific career
- Thesis: Greenland outlet glacier behavior during the 21st century : understanding velocities and environmental factors (2014)

Twila Moon is a scientist at the National Snow and Ice Data Center known for her work on the Greenland ice sheet.

== Education and career ==
Moon has a B.S. from Stanford University (2004) and an M.S. from the University of Washington (2008). She earned her Ph.D. in 2014 from the University of Washington where she worked on ice mass loss from a Greenland glacier. Following her Ph.D. she did postdoctoral work at the National Snow and Ice Data Center and the University of Oregon before joining the National Snow and Ice Data Center as a research scientist in 2017.

== Research ==
Moon is best known for her research on the Greenland ice sheet. Her early research examined the position of the ice sheet, and the change in the movement of the glacier. She has examined how water produced at the bottom of icebergs contributes to the freshwater found in Greenland's fjords, and defines the impact of the loss of the Greenland ice sheet on sea level rise. She is part of the group working to establish long-term observations of the Greenland ice sheet. Moon has examined the data quantifying the loss of ice from the Greenland ice sheet, and shares these results via conversations with the media and the United States House of Representatives. She speaks on climate change with multiple venues in the media, and is a co-author of Arctic report card. Moon has spoken about the border between being a scientist and being an activist in the realm of climate science.

== Selected publications ==
- Joughin, Ian; Smith, Ben E.; Howat, Ian M.; Scambos, Ted; Moon, Twila (2010). "Greenland flow variability from ice-sheet-wide velocity mapping". Journal of Glaciology. 56 (197): 415–430. Bibcode:2010JGlac..56..415J. doi:10.3189/002214310792447734. S2CID 32127970.
- Moon, T.; Joughin, I.; Smith, B.; Howat, I. (4 May 2012). "21st-Century Evolution of Greenland Outlet Glacier Velocities". Science. 336 (6081): 576–578. Bibcode:2012Sci...336..576M. doi:10.1126/science.1219985. PMID 22556249. S2CID 34158909.
- Moon, Twila; Joughin, Ian (7 June 2008). "Changes in ice front position on Greenland's outlet glaciers from 1992 to 2007". Journal of Geophysical Research. 113 (F2): F02022. Bibcode:2008JGRF..113.2022M. doi:10.1029/2007JF000927.
- Moon, Twila; Joughin, Ian; Smith, Ben; van den Broeke, Michiel R.; van de Berg, Willem Jan; Noël, Brice; Usher, Mika (28 October 2014). "Distinct patterns of seasonal Greenland glacier velocity: Seasonal velocity". Geophysical Research Letters. 41 (20): 7209–7216. doi:10.1002/2014GL061836. PMC 4373171. PMID 25821275.
