= Laura Gallardo =

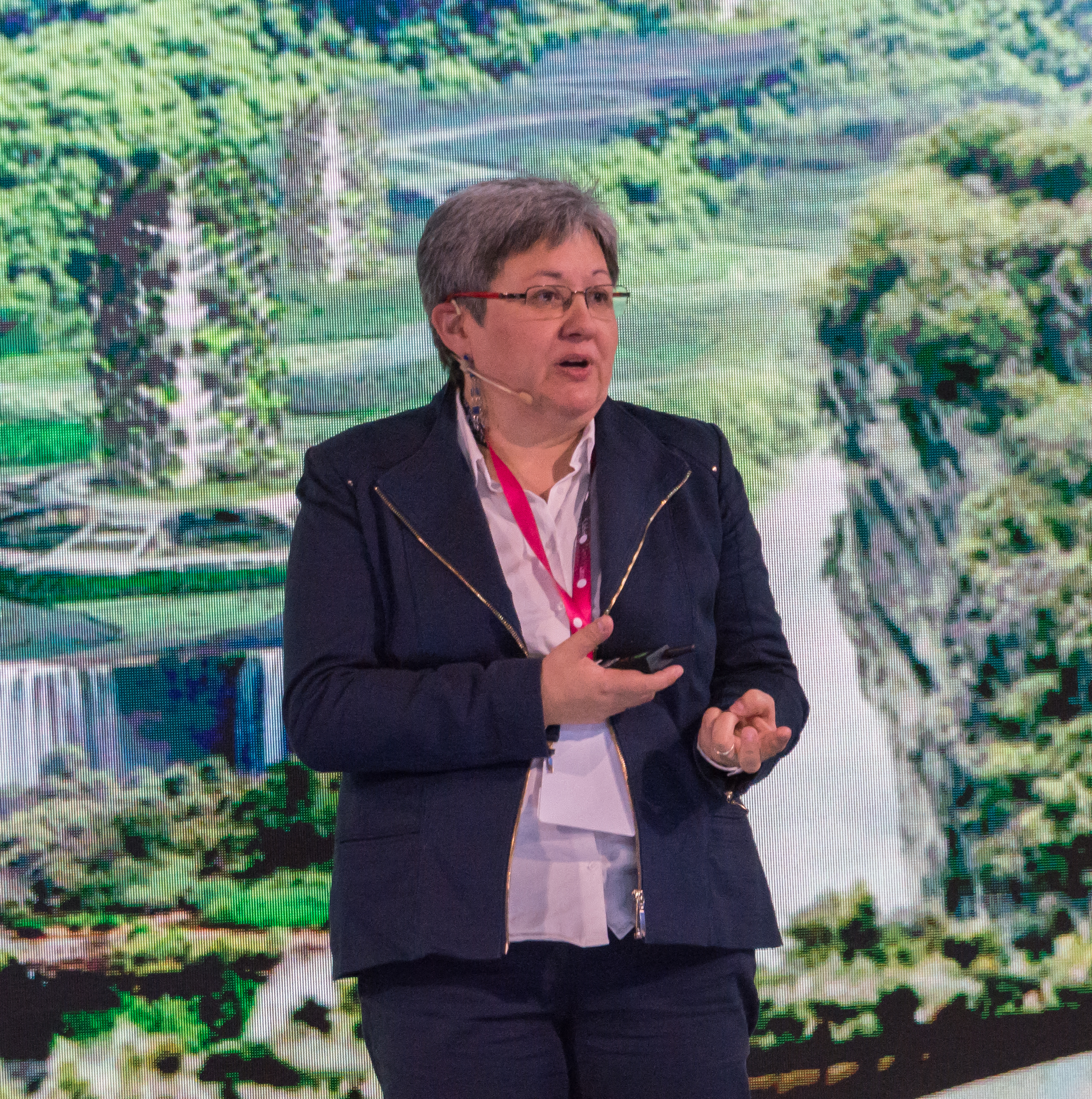
- in 2019
- Born: 1962 (age 63–64); Santiago
- Other name: Laura Gallardo-Klenner
- Education: Stockholm University
- Occupation: atmospheric scientist
- Employer: University of Chile
- Known for: Professor of geophysics

Laura Gallardo or Laura Gallardo-Klenner (born 1962) is a Chilean atmospheric scientist and professor.

== Life ==
Gallardo was born in Santiago in 1962. She graduated in physics at the University of Chile. Her PhD is in Chemical Meteorology which she was awarded by Stockholm University in 1996.

She is a full Professor when she and Jaime Campos were recognised within the University of Chile's Department of Geophysics in 2022.

Since 2022 she has been the director of the University of Chile's Postgraduate and Postgraduate Department of Geophysics.

She works at the Center for Climate Science and Resilience. In 2021 she was the lead author of the Sixth Assessment Report (AR6) of the Intergovernmental Panel on Climate Change (IPCC).

In 2023, Gallardo became vice-chair of Working Group II of the Intergovernmental Panel on Climate Change, the first Chilean to serve on its board.

== Awards ==
In 2024 she was one of nearly 500 scientists who were recognised as fellows of the American Association for the Advancement of Science.
