= Sabine Fuss =

German climate scientist

- Citizenship: German
- Education: Maastricht University (MA in International Economics); Maastricht University (PhD in Sustainable Development in the Energy Sector)
- Known for: Research on carbon dioxide removal and climate change mitigation; Author of the IPCC Special Report on Global Warming of 1.5 °C

Sabine Fuss is a German climate scientist. She heads the "Sustainable Resource Management and Global Change" working group at the Mercator Research Institute on Global Commons and Climate Change (MCC). She is a professor at Humboldt University of Berlin.

== Life ==
Fuss earned a master's degree in international economics and a doctorate in sustainable development in the energy sector from Maastricht University. She worked at the International Institute for Applied Systems Analysis. In 2018, she was appointed a professor at the Humboldt University of Berlin.

== Work ==
Fuss's research interests include resource management with a particular focus on systems analysis, decision-making under uncertain conditions, integrated assessment with a focus on mitigation of and adaptation to climate change, mechanisms for carbon dioxide management, climate-compatible development, and climate policy. Most recently, she has studied carbon dioxide removal. She believes "The longer the world waits with ambitious climate protection measures, the more crucial the importance of CO_{2} removal technologies." (Note: "Je länger die Welt mit ambitionierten Maßnahmen zum Klimaschutz wartet, desto entscheidender wird die Bedeutung von CO2-Entnahme-Technologien")

Fuss is one of the authors of the IPCC Special Report on Global Warming of 1.5 °C (2018).

== Selected publications ==
- Fuss, Sabine (4 April 2016). "Substantial risk for financial assets". Nature Climate Change. 6 (7). Springer Science and Business Media LLC: 659–660. doi:10.1038/nclimate2989. ISSN 1758-678X.
- Fuss, Sabine; Flachsland, Christian; Koch, Nicolas; Kornek, Ulrike; Knopf, Brigitte; Edenhofer, Ottmar (1 July 2018). "A Framework for Assessing the Performance of Cap-and-Trade Systems: Insights from the European Union Emissions Trading System". Review of Environmental Economics and Policy. 12 (2). University of Chicago Press: 220–241. doi:10.1093/reep/rey010. ISSN 1750-6816.
- Fuss, Sabine; Lamb, William F; Callaghan, Max W; Hilaire, Jérôme; Creutzig, Felix; Amann, Thorben; Beringer, Tim; de Oliveira Garcia, Wagner; Hartmann, Jens; Khanna, Tarun; Luderer, Gunnar; Nemet, Gregory F; Rogelj, Joeri; Smith, Pete; Vicente, José Luis Vicente; Wilcox, Jennifer; del Mar Zamora Dominguez, Maria; Minx, Jan C (21 May 2018). "Negative emissions—Part 2: Costs, potentials and side effects". Environmental Research Letters. 13 (6). IOP Publishing: 063002. Bibcode:2018ERL....13f3002F. doi:10.1088/1748-9326/aabf9f. hdl:10044/1/78139. ISSN 1748-9326. S2CID 55115841.
