= Galen McKinley =

Climate scientist

- Education: Massachusetts Institute of Technology
- Scientific career
- Thesis: Interannual variability of air-sea fluxes of carbon dioxide and oxygen (2002)

Galen Anile McKinley is a professor at Columbia University and the Lamont–Doherty Earth Observatory known for her work in the carbon cycle, particularly in the use of models to study the interface between the ocean and the atmosphere.

== Education and career ==
McKinley earned a B.S. from Rice University in 1995 and a Ph.D. from the Massachusetts Institute of Technology in 2002. Following postdoctoral positions at Instituto Nacional de Ecologia in Mexico and Princeton University, she joined the faculty at the University of Wisconsin Madison where she remained until 2017. She then moved to Columbia University and the Lamont–Doherty Earth Observatory and where she is a professor. In 2021 the National Science Foundation announced that a project for which McKinley serves as deputy director would receive $25 million to develop new models of ocean climate.

== Research ==
McKinley's early research examined the fluxes of oxygen between the atmosphere and the ocean. While a postdoctoral researcher in Mexico, she examined the impact of air pollution controls on Mexico City. In lakes, McKinley has examined changes in wind strength, circulation, and the optical properties of lakes. She has also investigated the potential for acidification of freshwater lakes from rising carbon dioxide levels. In marine systems she has examined the storage of carbon in the ocean, and changes over time in the oceans' ability to store carbon. Her recent work shows the importance of changes in the amount of carbon dioxide released due to human activities and the role of the 1991 eruption of Mount Pinatubo, and how changes in peoples' activities during the COVID-19 pandemic shifted the balance between greenhouse gas emissions and improvements in air quality.

== Selected publications ==
- Khatiwala, S.; Tanhua, T.; Mikaloff Fletcher, S.; Gerber, M.; Doney, S. C.; Graven, H. D.; Gruber, N.; McKinley, G. A.; Murata, A.; Ríos, A. F.; Sabine, C. L. (2 April 2013). "Global ocean storage of anthropogenic carbon". Biogeosciences. 10 (4): 2169–2191. Bibcode:2013BGeo...10.2169K. doi:10.5194/bg-10-2169-2013. hdl:20.500.11850/67385.
- Sweeney, Colm; Gloor, Emanuel; Jacobson, Andrew R.; Key, Robert M.; McKinley, Galen; Sarmiento, Jorge L.; Wanninkhof, Rik (23 May 2007). "Constraining global air-sea gas exchange for CO2with recent bomb14C measurements". Global Biogeochemical Cycles. 21 (2) 2006GB002784: n/a. Bibcode:2007GBioC..21.2015S. doi:10.1029/2006gb002784. ISSN 0886-6236. S2CID 3143419.
- Desai, Ankur R.; Austin, Jay A.; Bennington, Val; McKinley, Galen A. (December 2009). "Stronger winds over a large lake in response to weakening air-to-lake temperature gradient". Nature Geoscience. 2 (12): 855–858. Bibcode:2009NatGe...2..855D. doi:10.1038/ngeo693.
- McKinley, Galen A.; Follows, Michael J.; Marshall, John (28 May 2004). "Mechanisms of air-sea CO2flux variability in the equatorial Pacific and the North Atlantic". Global Biogeochemical Cycles. 18 (2) 2003GB002179: n/a. Bibcode:2004GBioC..18.2011M. doi:10.1029/2003gb002179. ISSN 0886-6236. S2CID 10478812.
- McKinley, Galen A.; Fay, Amanda R.; Takahashi, Taro; Metzl, Nicolas (September 2011). "Convergence of atmospheric and North Atlantic carbon dioxide trends on multidecadal timescales". Nature Geoscience. 4 (9): 606–610. Bibcode:2011NatGe...4..606M. doi:10.1038/ngeo1193.

== Awards and honors ==
McKinley was a Kavli Frontiers of Science fellow at the Chinese American Frontiers event in 2016. While at the University of Wisconsin Madison, McKinley was honored for her teaching with the Class of 1955 award, which she received in 2011. In 2020, McKinley received the Ocean Science Voyager Award from the American Geophysical Union, which honors a mid-career scientist for contributions to ocean sciences.
