= Gabrielle Rocap =

American marine biologist (born 1971)

- Education: Massachusetts Institute of Technology
- Known for: Arsenic-breathing microbes
- Scientific career
- Fields: Marine biology
- Workplaces: The Rocap Lab, University of Washington

Gabrielle Rocap (born February 16, 1971) is an American marine biologist and academic noted for her research on the evolution and ecology of marine bacteria and phytoplankton. She is one of the researchers who discovered microorganisms in the Pacific Ocean that consume arsenic to survive. She is currently a professor in the Oceanography department of the University of Washington.

== Biography ==
Rocap completed a degree in Biology at the Massachusetts Institute of Technology in 1992. In 2000, she obtained her Ph.D. in Biological Oceanography from the MIT-Woods Hole Oceanographic Institution joint program.

=== Research ===
Rocap conducts marine research in various locations such as Puget Sound and the South Atlantic Ocean. She is currently the Principal Investigator of The Rocap Lab of the University of Washington. Her work focuses on the evolution and ecology of marine bacteria and how these organisms contribute to the Earth's carbon and nutrient cycling process. She was the Chief Scientist of several research explorations that were deployed off the coast of Manzanillo, Mexico.

Together with Jaclyn Saunders, Rocap studied organisms in parts of the ocean that have no measurable oxygen. Based on samples collected near Mexico, they found arsenic-breathing microbes and these included two genetic pathways that are able to gain energy by converting arsenic-based molecules. According to Rocap, this discovery demonstrates "a whole new metabolism for the open ocean.”

== Selected publications ==
- Moore, Lisa R., Gabrielle Rocap, and Sallie W. Chisholm. "Physiology and molecular phylogeny of coexisting Prochlorococcus ecotypes." Nature 393, no. 6684 (1998).
- Rocap, Gabrielle et al. "Genome divergence in two Prochlorococcus ecotypes reflects oceanic niche differentiation." Nature 424, no. 6952 (2003): 1042-1047.
- Saunders, Jaclyn K., and Gabrielle Rocap. "Genomic potential for arsenic efflux and methylation varies among global Prochlorococcus populations." The ISME journal 10, no. 1 (2016).
- Gabrielle Rocap et al. "Cyanophage host‐derived genes reflect contrasting selective pressures with depth in the oxic and anoxic water column of the Eastern Tropical North Pacific." Environmental Microbiology 23, no. 6 (2021).
