= Inger Holmlund =

Swedish environmentalist and peace activist (1927–2019)

Inger Holmlund (1927–2019) was a Swedish environmentalist and peace activist. In the 1990s, together with her partner Werner Bauer, she established a women's centre in Homa Bay in western Kenya which focused on tree-planting and craft projects for women in the villages. She then returned to Sweden where in 2007 she called for women's action on achieving a world free of nuclear weapons.

== Biography ==
Born on 26 November 1927, Inger Holmlund grew up in Sundsvall in central Sweden. In the 1960s and 1970s, she and her husband Gustaf ran a clothes store in Sundsvall and Umeå. In 1976, she became interested in nuclear disarmament, joined Härnösand Folk High School as an environmental advisor and took part in anti-nuclear demonstrations.

In March 1980, she moved to Stockholm where she became active in organizations such as Framtiden i våra händer (The Future in Our Hands) and Kvinnor för Fred (Women for Peace). In the 1990s, she and her new partner Werner Bauer went to Homa Bay in Kenya. Together with Anna Horn and the Future Tree project, they created a self-sufficient centre where they developed handicraft project for women in the surrounding villages.

They returned to Sweden six years later. With the support of Kvinnor för Fred, Holmlund campaigned for a nuclear-free world in 124 municipalities from Stockholm to the north. After moving to Stockholm, despite failing health, she continued to be an active pacifist in her later yearsalmost to the end of her life.

Inger Holmlund died in Stockholm on 30 January 2019.

== See also ==
- List of peace activists
