= Paramjit Khurana =

Indian biochemist

- Born: 15 August 1956
- Occupations: Teaching and Research
- Years active: 1983 to date
- Known for: Plant Biotechnology, Molecular Biology, Genomics
- Notable work: Research in Wheat and Seribiotechnology

Paramjit Khurana (born 15 August 1956) is an Indian scientist in Plant Biotechnology, Molecular Biology, Genomics who is presently Professor in the Department of Plant Molecular Biology in the University of Delhi, Delhi. She has received many awards and published more than 125 scientific papers.

== Biography ==
Paramjit Khurana graduated from University of Delhi with degrees in botany; Bachelor of Science degree (B.Sc.) in (1975), Master of Science degree (M.Sc.) in 1977), and Master of Philosophy (M.Phil.) in (1978). She obtained her doctoral degree, Ph.D. in botany in 1983 from University of Delhi.

Khurana started her career working ad Scientist during 1983–84 in the Unit for Plant Cell and Molecular Biology Unit of the University of Delhi. She was a lecturer at Plant Biology Department the S.G.T.B. Khalsa College, University of Delhi from 1984 to 1987. During 1987-88 she worked as a research associate in Michigan State University (MSU), East Lansing, U.S. On her return from the US she has worked as lecturer (1989–90), reader (1990–98) and professor (1998 to date) in the Department of Plant Molecular Biology, University of Delhi, South Campus, and during 2004-07 she was head of this department.

Khurana's career achievements cover Wheat and Seribiotechnology, Comparative Genomics, in wheat biotechnology genetic transformation of Indian wheat for resistance against the cereal cyst nematode and for abiotic stress tolerance, development of mulberry transgenics capable of withstanding salinity and drought stress conditions, effective genetic engineering strategies leading to stress tolerance in crop plants and sustaining agriculture under changing climatic conditions, sequencing of chromosome 11 of rice, chromosome 5 of tomato, and chloroplast genome of mulberry. As professor she has mentored 10 Post-Doctorates, 15 Ph.D. scholars, 4 M.Phil. and 20 Master's students. Her major contribution has been to develop all-weather crops which would enable rise of the India's productivity several fold. She has developed modified mulberry which can cultivated in wastelands. She says that professional goal is: "Ten years down the line, I will still be working in my laboratory. I hope my products benefit everyone."

== Awards ==
Khurana is recipient of the ‘Certificate of Honour’ awarded by the Gantavaya Sansthan on International Women's Day (2011), and Professor Archana Sharma Memorial Award of the Indian Science Congress Association in 2011–2012.

== Fellowships ==
- Fellow of the Indian Academy of Sciences (2010)
- Fellow of the National Academy of Sciences, India (2003)
- Fellow of the National Academy of Agricultural Sciences (2014)
- Prof. J.C. Bose Fellowship (2012–2017) by the Department of Science & Technology, Government of India

== Publications ==
Khurana has 125 scientific publications to her credit published in national and international journals. Some of her publications published in national and international journals in association with other authors are:

- Identification and characterization of high temperature stress responsive genes in bread wheat (Triticum aestivum L.) and their regulation at various stages of development (2011), in Plant Molecular Biology Journal 75: 35–51.
- Development of drought tolerant transgenic doubled haploid in wheat through Agrobacterium-mediated transformation (2011) in Plant Biotech Journal 9: 408–417.
- Carotenoid biosynthesis genes in rice: Structural analysis, genome-wide expression profiling and phylogenetic analysis (2010) Mol. Genet. Genomics Journal 283: 13–33.
- High-efficiency transformation and selective tolerance against biotic and abiotic stress in mulberry, Morus indica cv. K2, by constitutive and inducible expression of tobacco osmotin (2010) in Transgenic Research Journal 20: 231–246
- Gene expression profile during somatic embryogenesis in wheat (Triticum aestivum) leaf base system (2007) in Plant Mol. Biology Journal 65: 677–692.
- Rosales sister to Fabales: towards resolving the rosid puzzle (2006) in Molecular Phylogenetics & Evolution Journal 44: 488–493
- The chloroplast genome of mulberry (Morus indica cv. K2): complete nucleotide sequence, gene organization and comparative analysis (2006) published in Tree Genetics & Genomes Journal 3: 49–59
- The map-based sequence of the rice genome (2005) as part of International Rice Genome Sequencing Project, published in Nature 436: 793–800
- Genetic transformation of Indian bread (T. aestivum) and pasta (T. durum) wheat by particle bombardment of mature embryo-derived calli (2003) published in BMC Plant Biology 3: 5–16
- Bradyrhizobium japonicum lipopolysaccharide inhibits symplastic communication in soybean (Glycine max) cells (1989) in J. Biol. Chem. 264: 12119-12121
