= Karen Oberhauser =

Research entomologist

Karen Suzanne Oberhauser
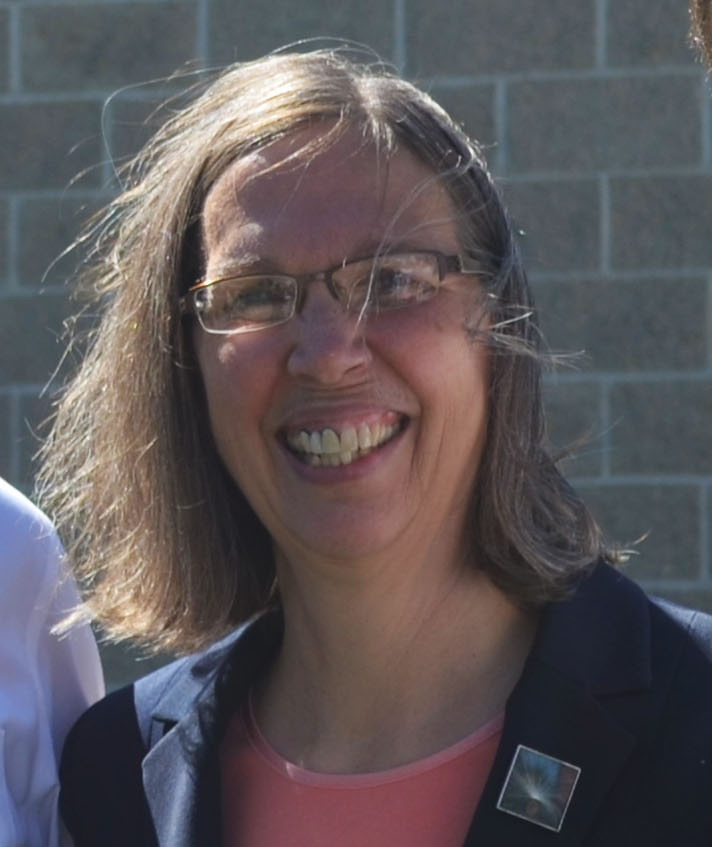
- Karen Oberhauser in 2015
- Born: 1956 (age 69–70)
- Education: Harvard College, University of Wisconsin–Madison, University of Minnesota
- Known for: Monarch butterfly research
- Scientific career
- Fields: Conservation biology
- Workplaces: University of Minnesota

Karen Suzanne Oberhauser (born 1956) is an American conservation biologist who specializes in monarch butterflies.

== Education and career ==
She graduated with a Bachelor of Arts degree in biology at Harvard College, a Bachelor of Science degree in natural science education at the University of Wisconsin–Madison, and a PhD in ecology and behavioral biology at the University of Minnesota. Oberhauser is an adjunct professor in the Fisheries, Wildlife and Conservation Biology department and former director of the Monarch Lab at the University of Minnesota. In October 2017, she became the director of the University of Wisconsin–Madison Arboretum, in Madison, Wisconsin.

== Research ==
Oberhauser has been studying monarch butterflies since 1984. Her research has addressed many aspects of monarch butterfly (Danaus plexippus) ecology, including reproduction, parasites, factors influencing immature monarch distribution and abundance, and impacts of insecticides, global climate change, and genetically-modified crops.

In addition to authoring many publications in scholarly journals, she was also co-editor for two books published by Cornell Press:

- The Monarch Butterfly: Biology and Conservation ISBN 978-0-8014-4188-2
- Monarchs in a Changing World: Biology and Conservation of an Iconic Butterfly ISBN 978-0-8014-5315-1

In 2014, Oberhauser and a colleague published a scientific article examining how usage of Monsanto's Roundup herbicide on farmland in North America contributes to the decline of milkweeds, important food sources for the butterflies. They found that the size of populations of milkweed were smaller in areas of increased Roundup use, suggesting that the loss of this food source may contribute to the decline of monarchs. The milkweed limitation hypothesis as this has become known, has been tested by other groups of scientists finding conflicting results. Thus, the actual contribution of Roundup use and loss of populations of milkweed to the decline of monarch butterflies is still unclear.

== Career activism ==
Oberhauser is a strong proponent of citizen science, environmental and scientific literacy. She is a member of the Editorial Board for Citizen Science: Theory and Practice.

In 2013, she was named a Champion of Change for Citizen Science by the White House. President Eric Kaler of the University of Minnesota stated that "Professor Oberhauser represents the best and the brightest in our faculty here at the University of Minnesota. Her work with citizen scientists, teachers and elementary school students exemplifies the deep importance we place on public engagement, which is a core part of the University’s land grant mission."

Oberhauser has been director for the Monarchs in the Classroom Program, president of the Monarch Butterfly Sanctuary Foundation and director of the Monarch Larva Monitoring Project.

== Select publications ==
- Saunders, S. P.; Ries, L.; Oberhauser, K. S.; Thogmartin, W. E. & Zipkin, E. F. (2018). "Local and cross‐seasonal associations of climate and land use with abundance of monarch butterflies Danaus plexippus". Ecography. 41 (2): 278–290.
- Stenoien, C.; Nail, K. R.; Zalucki, J. M.; Parry, H.; Oberhauser, K. S. & Zalucki, M. P. (2018). "Monarchs in decline: a collateral landscape‐level effect of modern agriculture". Insect Science. 25 (4): 528–541.
- Oberhauser, K.; Wiederholt, R.; Diffendorfer, J. E.; Semmens, D.; Ries, L.; Thogmartin, W. E. & Semmens, B. (2017). "A trans‐national monarch butterfly population model and implications for regional conservation priorities". Ecological Entomology. 42 (1): 51–60.
- Oberhauser, K. S., Taylor, O. R., Reppert, S. M., Dingle, H., Nail, K. R., Pyle, R. M., & Stenoien, C. (2013). "Are monarch butterflies true navigators? The jury is still out". Proceedings of the National Academy of Sciences, 110 (39), E3680-E3680.
- Oberhauser, K., & LeBuhn, G. (2012). "Insects and plants: engaging undergraduates in authentic research through citizen science". Frontiers in Ecology and the Environment, 10 (6): 318–320.
- Oberhauser, K. (2012). "Tachinid flies and monarch butterflies: citizen scientists document parasitism patterns over broad spatial and temporal scales". American Entomologist, 58 (1).
- Oberhauser, K., Howard, E., & Batalden, R. (2009). Monarch butterfly monitoring in North America: Overview of initiatives and protocols. Commission for Environmental Cooperation.

== Personal life ==
Oberhauser grew up in Wisconsin and married Don Alstad in 1985; the couple has two daughters. Don died in April 2014 at the age of 67.
