= Tara Shine =

Irish environmental scientist, policy advisor

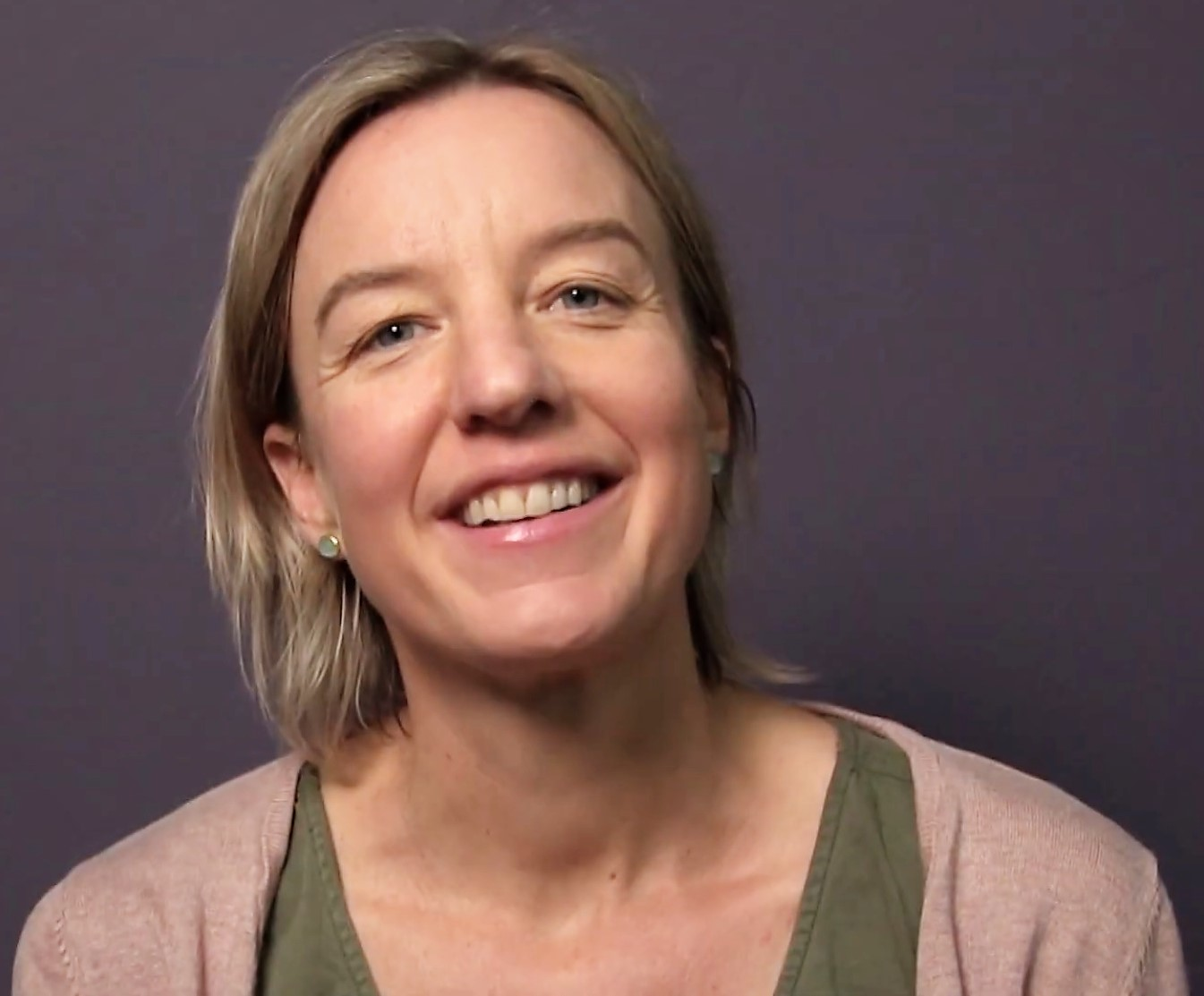
- Tara Shine speaks for the International Institute for Environment and Development in 2019
- Education: Ulster University (BSc, PhD)
- Scientific career
- Workplaces: Mary Robinson Foundation
- Thesis: An integrated investigation of the ephemeral wetlands of eastern Mauritania and recommendations for management (2002)

Tara Shine is an Irish environmental scientist, policy advisor and science communicator. Her work considers climate change negotiations and capacity building. She is a former member of the United Nations Framework Convention on Climate Change Group of Experts. In 2020 Shine was announced as one of the speakers for the Royal Institution Christmas Lectures.

== Early life and education ==
Shine is from the Republic of Ireland. She earned her bachelor's degree in environmental science at Ulster University. She remained there for her graduate studies, joining the Department of Geography. Her doctoral research considered the wetlands of Mauritania.

== Career ==
Shine took part in Homeward Bound, a global leadership programme for women scientists. She served as an advisor to the Mary Robinson Foundation and on the Board of Trustees of the International Institute for Environment and Development (IIED) from 2014 until October 2025. Shine has presented several television shows for the BBC, including Expedition Borneo, Lost crocodiles of the pharaohs and A Wild Irish Year.

She is the founder of the social enterprise Change by Degrees, which looks to teach people how to engage individuals on how to live and work sustainably. The enterprise inspired her first book, How to Save Your Planet One Object At A Time, which looks to advise people in making more sustainable decisions.

In September 2020 Shine became chair of the Board of Trustees of IIED and served in that role until September 2025. She was selected as one of the Royal Institution Christmas Lectures speakers in 2020, joining Helen Czerski and Christopher Jackson to discuss the impact of human activity on the planet.

== Select publications ==
=== Books ===
- Shine, Tara (16 April 2020). How to save your planet one object at a time. London. ISBN 978-1-4711-8410-9. OCLC 1140153195.

=== Journal articles ===
- Robinson, Mary; Shine, Tara (2018). "Achieving a climate justice pathway to 1.5 °C". Nature Climate Change. 8 (7): 564–569. Bibcode:2018NatCC...8..564R. doi:10.1038/s41558-018-0189-7. ISSN 1758-6798. S2CID 90453499.
- Shine, Tara (2013). "Climate justice: Equity and justice informing a new climate agreement" (PDF). WRI.
- Shine, Tara; Campillo, Gisela (22 December 2016), The Role of Development Finance in Climate Action Post-2015, OECD Development Co-operation Working Papers, doi:10.1787/18a859bf-en
