= Institut Pierre Simon Laplace =

French climate research organization

The Institut Pierre-Simon Laplace (Pierre Simon Laplace Institute) is a French organization made up of 9 laboratories (CEREA, GEOPS, LATMOS, LERMA:TASQ, LISA, LMD, LOCEAN, LSCE, METIS) that conduct research into climate science.

== Organization ==
The 9 laboratories that make up the institute include:

- Centre d'enseignement et de recherche en environnement atmosphérique (CEREA)
- Géosciences Paris-Saclay (GEOPS)
- Laboratoire atmosphères, milieux, observations spatiales (LATMOS)
- TASQ team from LERMA
- Laboratoire inter-universitaire des systèmes atmosphériques (LISA)
- Laboratoire de météorologie dynamique (LMD)
- Laboratoire d'Océanographie et du Climat (LOCEAN)
- Laboratoire des sciences du climat et de l'environnement (LSCE)
- Laboratoire Milieux environnementaux, transferts et interactions dans les hydrosystèmes et les sols (METIS)
