= Cara Augustenborg =

Irish and American environmental scientist

- Born: Cara Aisling Augustenborg; April 12, 1978 (age 48); Germany
- Other name: 'The Verdant Yank'
- Citizenship: United States; Ireland
- Education: University of California, Los Angeles
- Known for: Founded Impact Research Management
- Spouse: Mark Hughes (divorced)
- Scientific career
- Fields: Environmental science
- Workplaces: University College Dublin
- Thesis: Nitrogen recycling for the sustainability of Irish agriculture (2007)
- Doctoral advisor: Irwin Suffet
- Website: www.caraaugustenborg.com

Cara Aisling Augustenborg (born 1978) is an American and Irish environmental scientist, media pundit, assistant professor at University College Dublin and a member of Ireland's Climate Change Advisory Council and President Michael D. Higgins' Council of State.

== Early life and education ==
Augustenborg was born in 1978 in Germany where her father, who has Danish ancestry, was stationed as a United States Air Force fighter pilot; her mother is from County Kerry, Ireland. In her childhood she lived in Pennsylvania, Saudi Arabia and New Orleans before the family settled near the Hanford Site, a nuclear power plant in Washington state, United States, where she attended high school. She has a BSc in biochemistry from the University of Washington and an MSc in Environmental Health Sciences and Ph.D. in Environmental Science and Engineering from University of California, Los Angeles. Her 2007 dissertation was titled Nitrogen recycling for the sustainability of Irish agriculture. Irwin Suffet was her committee chair.

She moved to Ireland in 2003 with a Fulbright Scholarship to do research at Teagasc in County Wexford, and in 2007 moved to do post-doctoral research at Trinity College Dublin's School of Business and University College Dublin's School of Agriculture. She has both Irish and American citizenship.

== Career ==
Since 2011 Augustenborg has led her own consultancy company, Impact Research Management, based in Bray.

In 2014, Augustenborg was an unsuccessful candidate for the Green Party in Irish local elections.

Augustenborg was chair of Friends of the Earth Europe from 2015 to 2019, and of Friends of the Earth Ireland from 2015 to 2017.

Augustenborg is an assistant professor in landscape studies and environmental policy in the school of architecture, planning and environmental policy at University College Dublin, appointed in 2021.

In 2019, she was appointed by Michael D. Higgins as one of the seven presidential nominees on the Irish Council of State, a body which advises the president. In 2021 she was appointed by Eamon Ryan to the Climate Change Advisory Council.

She writes a blog as "The Verdant Yank", which was awarded "Best Irish Current Affairs and Politics blog" in the 2016 Littlewoods Ireland Blog Awards. She hosts a weekly podcast "Down To Earth" on Newstalk.

She was named as "Woman of Influence" in the 2020 Irish Women's Awards.

== Personal life ==
Augustenborg was married to Irishman Mark Hughes but the marriage ended in 2016. She lives in Bray, County Wicklow, and has one child. She has said that "If I could change one thing in our society, I would take over the airwaves for a week of non- stop climate content." and that the best advice ever given to her was "Good enough is good enough".
