= Champions of the Earth =

Annual United Nations environmental award

The United Nations Environment Programme (UNEP) established Champions of the Earth in 2005 as an annual awards programme to recognize outstanding environmental leaders from the public and private sectors and from civil society.

== Award details ==
Typically, five to seven laureates are selected annually. Each laureate is invited to an award ceremony to receive a trophy, give an acceptance speech and take part in a press conference. No financial awards are conferred. This awards programme is a successor to UNEP's Global 500 Roll of Honour.

In 2017, the program was expanded to include Young Champions of the Earth – a forward-looking prize for talented innovators, 18 to 30, who demonstrate outstanding potential to create positive environmental impact. The initiative is run in partnership with the Covestro, a plastics company. It is awarded every year by UNEP to seven young environmentalists from around the world between the ages of 18 and 30, for their outstanding ideas to protect the environment. Young Champions receive $15,000 of financial support per champion.

== Awardees: Champions of the Earth ==
=== 2025 ===
- Pacific Islands Students Fighting Climate Change (Vanuatu)
- Supriya Sahu (India)
- Mariam Issoufou (Niger)
- Imazon (Brazil)
- Manfredi Caltagirone (Italy)

=== 2024 ===
- Sônia Guajajara (Brazil)
- Amy Bowers Cordalis (United States)
- Gabriel Paun (Romania)
- Lu Qi (China)
- Madhav Gadgil (India)
- SEKEM (Egypt)

=== 2023 ===
- Joy Belmonte, (The Philippines) - Policy Leadership
- Ellen MacArthur Foundation (United Kingdom) - Inspiration and Action
- Blue Circle (China) - Entrepreneurial Vision
- José Manuel Moller (Chile) - Entrepreneurial Vision

=== 2022 ===
- Arcenciel (Lebanon) - Inspiration and Action
- Constantino Aucca Chutas (Peru) - Inspiration and Action
- Partha Dasgupta (United Kingdom) - Science and Innovation
- Purnima Devi Barman (India) - Entrepreneurial Vision
- Cécile Bibiane Ndjebet (Cameroon) - Inspiration and Action

=== 2021 ===
- Mia Mottley (Barbados) - Policy Leadership
- Gladys Kalema-Zikusoka (Uganda) - Science and Innovation
- Maria Kolesnikova (Kyrgyzstan) - Entrepreneurial Vision
- David Attenborough (United Kingdom) - Lifetime Achievement Award

=== 2020 ===
- Frank Bainimarama (Fiji) - Policy Leadership
- Fabian Leendertz (Germany) - Science and Innovation
- Mindy Lubber (United States) - Entrepreneurial Vision
- Nemonte Nenquimo (Ecuador) - Inspiration and Action
- Yacouba Sawadogo (Burkina Faso) - Inspiration and Action
- Robert D. Bullard (United States)- Lifetime Achievement Award

=== 2019 ===
- Costa Rica - Policy Leadership
- Katharine Hayhoe (Canada) - Science and Innovation
- Ant Forest (China) - Inspiration and Action
- Fridays For Future (International) - Inspiration and Action
- Patagonia (United States) - Entrepreneurial Vision
- Louise Mabulo (The Philippines) - Environmental conservation

=== 2018 ===
- Cochin International Airport - Entrepreneurial Vision
- Emmanuel Macron - Policy Leadership
- Beyond Meat - Science and Innovation
- Impossible Foods - Science and Innovation
- Joan Carling - Lifetime Achievement Award
- Narendra Modi - Policy Leadership
- Zhejiang’s Green Rural Revival Programme - Inspiration and Action

=== 2017 ===
- Paul A. Newman & NASA's Goddard Space Flight Center - Science and Innovation
- Mobike - Entrepreneurial Vision
- Jeff Orlowski - Inspiration and Action
- Saihanba National Forest Park - Inspiration and Action
- Christopher I'Anson - General Champion
- Wang Wenbiao - Lifetime Achievement Award

=== 2016 ===
- Afroz Shah - Inspiration and Action
- Berta Cáceres - Inspiration and Action
- José Sarukhán Kermez - Lifetime Achievement
- Leyla Acaroglu - Science and Innovation
- The Moroccan Agency for Solar Energy (MASEN) - Entrepreneurial Vision
- Paul Kagame - Policy Leadership

=== 2015 ===
- Sheikh Hasina (Bangladesh) - Policy Leadership
- Black Mamba APU - Inspiration & Action
- The National Geographic Society - Science & Innovation
- Natura Brasil - Entrepreneurial Vision
- Paul Polman - Entrepreneurial Vision

=== 2014 ===
- Boyan Slat - Inspiration and Action
- Fatima Jibrell, Somalia - Environmental conservation
- Susilo Bambang Yudhoyono - Policy Leadership
- Tommy Remengesau Jr - Policy Leadership
- Mario José Molina-Pasquel Henríquez - Lifetime Leadership
- Robert Watson - Science and Innovation
- Sylvia Earle - Lifetime Leadership
- U.S. Green Building Council - Entrepreneurial Vision

=== 2013 ===
- Janez Potočnik - Policy Leadership
- Brian McClendon - Entrepreneurial Vision
- Carlo Petrini - Inspiration and Action
- Izabella Teixeira - Policy Leadership
- Jack Dangermond - Entrepreneurial Vision
- Martha Isabel Ruiz Corzo - Inspiration and Action
- Veerabhadran Ramanathan - Science and Innovation

=== 2012 ===
- President Tsakhiagiin Elbegdorj, Mongolia - Policy Leadership category
- Fabio Coletti Barbosa, Brazil (CEO of Grupo Abril) and Dr Sultan Ahmed al Jaber, United Arab Emirates (CEO of Masdar)- Entrepreneurial Vision category
- Bertrand Piccard, Switzerland - Inspiration and Action category
- Sander Van Der Leeuw, Netherlands - Science and Innovation category
- Samson Parashina, Kenya - Special Category for Grassroots Initiatives

=== 2011 ===
- President Felipe Calderón, Mexico - Policy Leadership Category
- Dr. Olga Speranskaya, Russia - Science & Innovation Category
- Zhang Yue, Broad Group, China - Entrepreneurial Vision Category
- Louis Palmer, Switzerland - Inspiration & Action Category [co-winner]
- Angélique Kidjo, Benin - Inspiration & Action Category co-winner

=== 2010 ===
- President Mohamed Nasheed, Maldives - Policy Leadership Category
- Taro Takahashi, Japan - Science & Innovation Category
- Vinod Khosla, India - Entrepreneurial Vision Category
- Prince Mostapha Zaher, Afghanistan - Inspiration & Action Category [co-winner]
- Zhou Xun, China - Inspiration & Action Category co-winnerSpecial Award

=== Special Award ===
- President Bharrat Jagdeo, Guyana - For Biodiversity Conservation & Ecosystem Management

=== 2009 ===
- Erik Solheim, Norway - Policy Leadership Category (co-winner)
- Kevin Conrad and the Coalition for Rainforest Nations, Papua New Guinea - Policy Leadership Category (co-winner)
- Janine Benyus, United States - Science & Innovation Category
- Ron Gonen, United States - Entrepreneurial Vision Category
- Tulsi Tanti, India - Entrepreneurial Vision Category
- Yann Arthus-Bertrand, France - Inspiration & Action Category

=== 2008 ===
- Balgis Osman-Elasha, Sudan from Africa - For her work on climate change and adaptation in northern and eastern Africa.
- Atiq Rahman, Bangladesh from Asia and the Pacific - For his national and international experience in sustainable development, and environment and resource management. He is one of the leading specialists in the field.
- Albert II, Prince of Monaco, Monaco from Europe: For his commitment to sustainable development in Monaco. Under his leadership, Monaco is now applying an exemplary policy on CO_{2} reduction in every sphere of society as well as in the business sector.
- Liz Thompson, Barbados, from Latin America and the Caribbean - For her outstanding work at the national and international levels. She is one of the recognized leaders on environmental issues of the Small Island Developing States (SIDS).
- Timothy E. Wirth, United States from North America - For his work as the head of the UN Foundation and Better World Fund, he established the environment as a priority and mobilized resources to address it.
- Abdul-Qader Ba-Jammal, Yemen from West Asia: For his environmental policies as Minister and then as Prime Minister in Yemen. He established its Ministry of Water and Environment and the Environment Protection Authority.

=== Special Prize ===
- Helen Clark, New Zealand - For her environmental strategies and her three initiatives - the emissions trading scheme, the energy strategy and the energy efficiency and conservation strategy.

=== 2007 ===
- Cherif Rahmani, Algeria from Africa - For advancing environmental law in Algeria and for addressing the issue of desertification.
- Elisea "Bebet" Gillera Gozun, Philippines from Asia and the Pacific - for pushing forward the environmental agenda in her native Philippines by winning the trust of business leaders, non-governmental organizations and political decision-makers alike.
- Viveka Bohn, Sweden from Europe: for playing a prominent role in multilateral negotiations and her leadership in global efforts to ensure chemical safety.
- Marina Silva, Brazil from Latin America and the Caribbean - For her tireless fight to protect the Amazon rainforest while taking into account the perspectives of people who use the resources in their daily lives.
- Al Gore, United States from North America - For making environmental protection a pillar of his public service and for educating the world on the dangers posed by rising greenhouse gas emissions.
- His Royal Highness Prince Hassan Bin Talal, Jordan from West Asia - For his belief in transboundary collaboration to protect the environment and for addressing environmental issues in a holistic manner.

=== Special Prize ===
- Jacques Rogge and the International Olympic Committee (IOC) - For advancing the sport and environment agenda by providing greater resources to sustainable development and for introducing stringent environmental requirements for cities bidding to host Olympic Games

=== 2006 ===
- Rosa Elena Simeon Negrin, Cuba
- Women's Environment & Development Organization
- Tewolde Berhan Gebre Egziabher, Ethiopia
- Masoumeh Ebtekar, Iran
- Mohamed El-Ashry, Egypt
- Tommy Koh Thong Bee, Singapore
- Mikhail Gorbachev, Russia

=== 2005 ===
- King Jigme Singye Wangchuck and the people of Bhutan, Bhutan
- Sheikh Zayed bin Sultan Al Nahyan, United Arab Emirates
- Thabo Mbeki, South Africa
- Ecumenical Patriarch Bartholomew, Native Greek
- Sheila Watt-Cloutier, Canada
- Julia Carabias Lillo, Mexico
- Zhou Qiang and the All-China Youth Federation, China

== Awardees: Young Champions of the Earth ==
=== 2025 ===
- Joseph Nguthiru, Kenya.
- Jinali Modi, India.
- Noemi Florea, United States of America.

=== 2020 ===
- Xiaoyuan Ren, China.
- Vidyut Mohan, India.
- Nzambi Matee, Kenya.
- Niria Alicia Garcia, United States of America.
- Max Hidalgo Quinto, Peru.
- Lefteris Arapakis, Greece.
- Fatemah Alzelzela, Kuwait.

=== 2019 ===
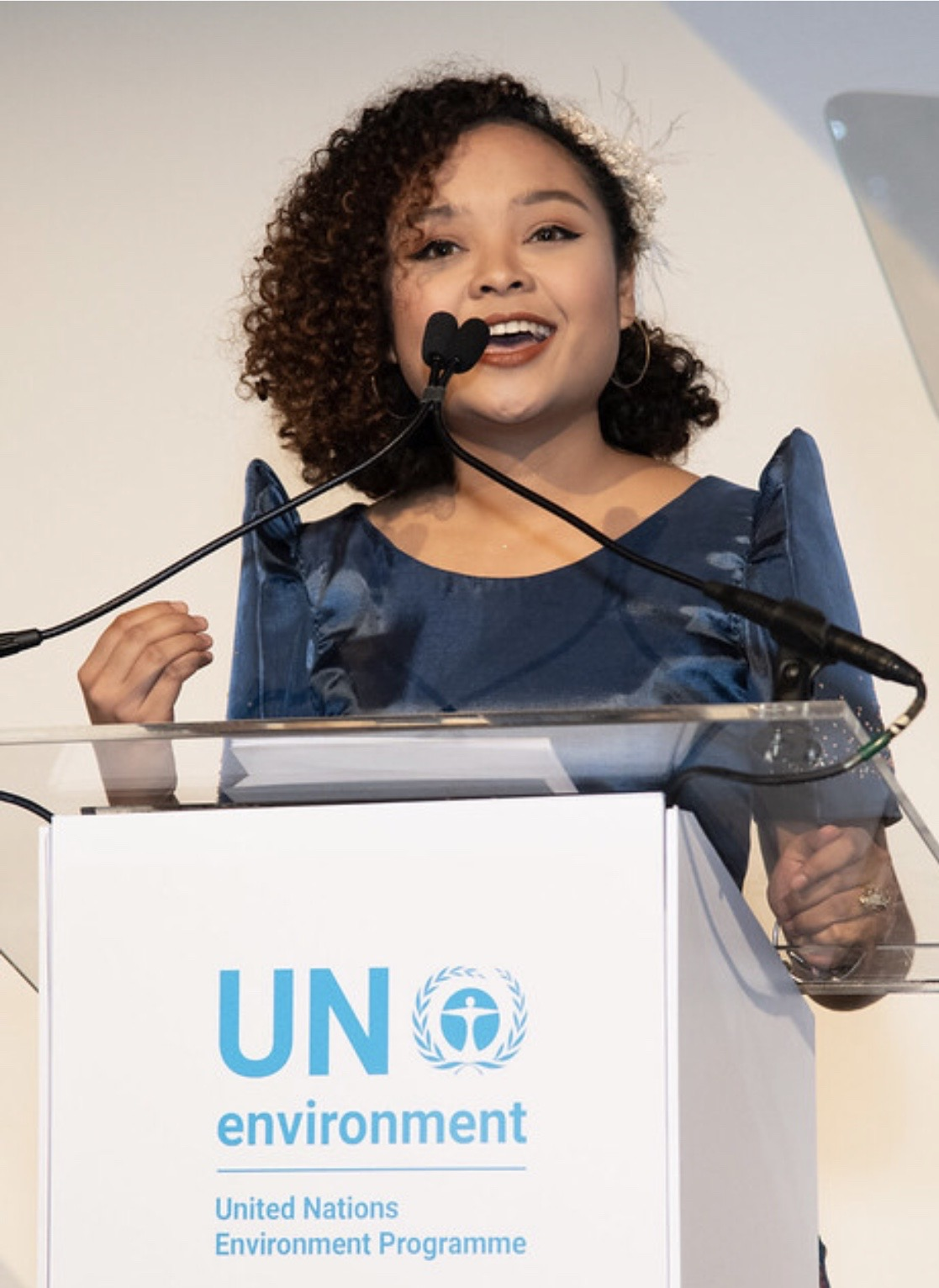
Louise Mabulo UN Young Champion of the Earth Award Ceremony Speech

- Molly Burhans, United States of America.
- Omar Itani, Lebanon.
- Sonika Manandhar, Nepal.
- Marianna Muntianu, Russia.
- Louise Mabulo, Philippines.
- Anna Luísa Beserra, Brazil.
- Adjany Costa, Angola.

=== 2018 ===
- Shady Rabab, Egypt.
- Miranda Wang, United States of America.
- Miao Wang, China.
- Hugh Weldon, Ireland.
- Heba Al-Farra, Kuwait.
- Gator Halpern, Bahamas.
- Arpit Dhupar, India.

=== 2017 ===
- Omer Badokhon, Yemen.
- Adam Dixon, Europe.
- Kaya Dorey, North America.
- Eritai Kateibwi, Earth for Asia & the Pacific
- Mariama Mamane, Niger.
- Liliana Jaramillo Pazmiño, Latin America & the Caribbean.

== See also ==
- Heroes of the Environment
- Forest Hero Award
- List of environmental awards
