= Marianna Muntianu =

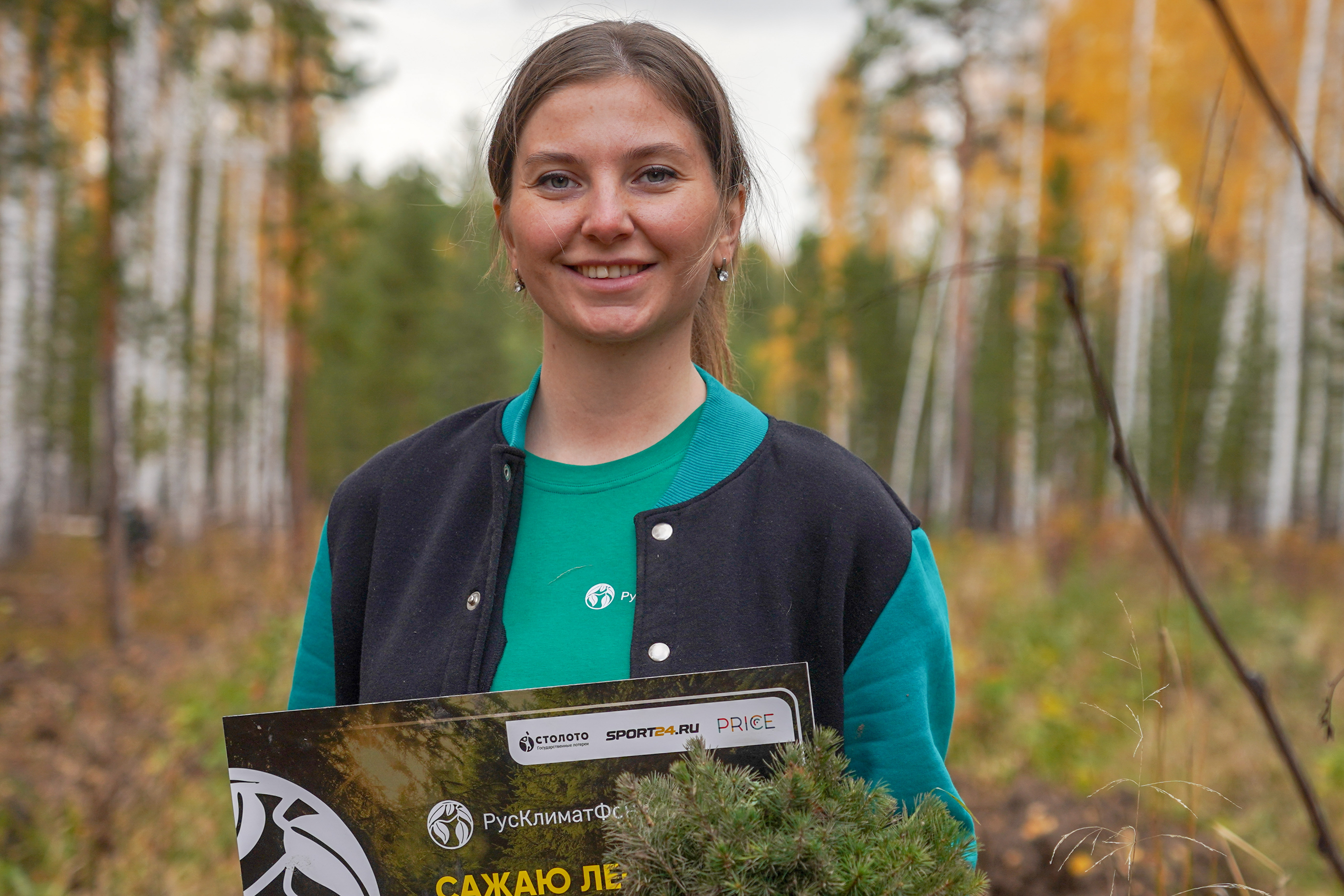
- Born: 14 August 1989 (age 36)
- Occupation: president of the Russian Climate Fund
- Awards: UN "Young Champions of the Earth" 2019
- Website: rusclimatefund.ru

Marianna Muntianu (born 14 August 1989) is the founder and president of the Russian Climate Fund, an environmental protection organization. In 2019, Muntianu was awarded the UN Prize "Young Champions of the Earth" for her innovative approach to protecting the environment.

== Environmental commitment ==
When fires destroyed approximately two million hectares of forest across the country in 2010, Muntianu joined the environmental protection movement ECA, which was founded as a result of those forest fires. She took over the management of the department in her Kostroma region. With the financial support of the Russian cosmetics manufacturer Faberlic and the support of numerous volunteers, the organization succeeded in planting ten million trees by 2015.

Later on, Muntianu became the Plant a Forest Leader within the ECA movement. Besides planting trees she was committed on working on an all-encompassing communication concept in order to raise awareness of the climate and the environment among the population. On the eve of Valentine's Day, 2019, for example, the mobile phone game "Plant the Forest" was launched by a team around Muntianu in Russian and English. The application allows users to virtually plant trees on wasteland, protect the resulting forests from fire and pests, and experience how the animals return there. At the same time, they have the opportunity to donate money, so that forests can also arise in reality. For this innovative approach and commitment to forest conservation Muntianu was honored with the UN prize "Young Champions of the Earth" in 2019. Every year the United Nations awards this prize to seven young environmentalists.

In 2020, Muntianu founded her own organization, the Russian Climate Fund. With this she would like to continue forests restoration and conduct a comprehensive climate protection campaign. Tree planting will remain an important part of this, and there is also a focus on environmental education, focusing on climate change. Podcasts launched monthly allow important environmental players to have their say, such as Arshak Makichyan, leader of the Russian "Fridays for Future" or Erik Albrecht, author of the book 'Generation Greta'. A podcast about how companies manage to become more sustainable is being planned.

The Russian Climate Fund currently employs 12 people in Moscow. With the help of volunteers they aim to plant 1 billion trees by 2050. For that the organization offers potential donors – including companies – to calculate their CO_{2} footprint and according to that compensate it by planting trees or donate money for planting campaigns. The Russian Climate Fund promises each donor a certificate and a report containing the coordinates of the growing forest.
