= Niria Alicia Garcia =

American environmental activist and human rights advocate (born 1993)

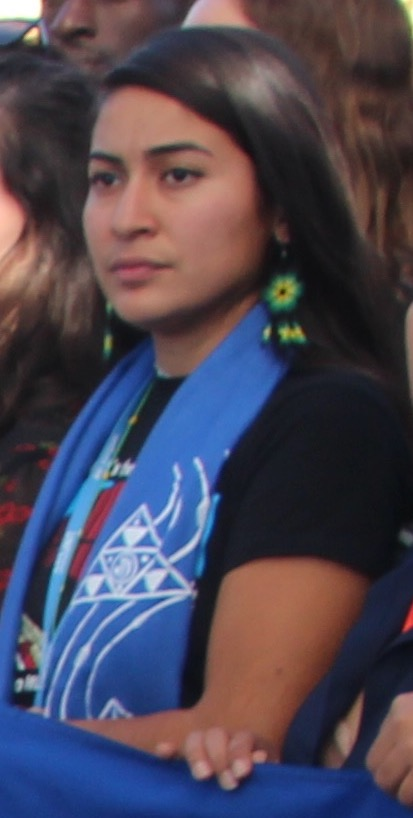
- Niria Alicia Garcia in 2016 at the COP22 UN climate talks.
- Born: b. 1993; Oregon
- Occupations: environmental activist, human rights advocate, educator
- Organization: Run4Salmon
- Awards: UNEP Young Champion of the Earth 2020

Niria Alicia Garcia (born 1993) is a Xicana environmental activist, human rights advocate, and educator. She is an organizer involved with indigenous-led species restoration efforts in California's Sacramento River watershed.

== Early life and education ==
Niria Alicia Garcia was born in Oregon to a family of migrant farmworkers. Her mother is from Michoacán, Mexico, and migrated to the United States in her twenties, living in California before settling in Oregon's Rogue Valley.

Garcia graduated from the University of Oregon with degrees in environmental studies, Latin American studies, and nonprofit administration. As an undergraduate she participated in a study abroad program in Salvador, Brazil, doing field work with favela residents and community leaders. There she witnessed the impact of grassroots campaigns agitating for greater investment in marginalized communities and found role models in their women leaders. This experience inspired her to pursue a career in human rights advocacy and social justice activism.

Garcia went on to study for a masters degree in human rights at Columbia University.

== Activism ==
Garcia was one of the organizers of the People's Climate Movement "Rise for Climate, Jobs, and Justice" demonstration at the 2018 Global Climate Action Summit in San Francisco. As part of that action, she and other climate activists interrupted Governor Jerry Brown as he came onstage to give a speech. They voiced demands for an end to new oil and gas drilling contracts in California, and asked Brown to account for the contradiction between his reputation as a political leader on climate issues and his continued support for fossil fuel projects. Garcia was removed from the hall by security, along with two other women.

Garcia has spoken publicly about the effects of climate change in her own life. During the disastrous 2020 fire season, she had to evacuate her home when it was threatened by the Almeda Fire in Oregon, and her father's home was destroyed. She was one of the organizers of a bilingual commemorative community event on the first anniversary of the fire, which displaced thousands of local residents.

In 2019 Garcia attended COP25 as the leader of a delegation of indigenous youth affiliated with the advocacy group SustainUS. Other social justice organizations with whom she has worked include Earthjustice, Our Children's Trust, Honor the Earth, Greenaction, Rustic Pathways, Women's Earth Alliance and No More Deaths.

=== Run4Salmon ===
Garcia is one of the lead organizers of Run4Salmon, a prayer journey led by the Winnemem Wintu Tribe and their Chief Caleen Sisk. Since 2016, Run4Salmon has sponsored a yearly journey along the migratory path of the Chinook salmon, from high-elevation spawning grounds in the freshwater McCloud River to the coastal waters of the Sacramento–San Joaquin River Delta. Participants travel the 300-mile-long route over the course of two weeks, raising awareness about the health of California's waterways biodiversity and the endangered status of the salmon, a keystone species. Along the way they host events that advocate for ecosystem restoration and celebrate indigenous lifeways.

Garcia began a virtual reality film project about these issues and the Run4Salmon journey in 2020 after receiving funding from the United Nations. The educational film aims to make the beauty and the fragility of the McCloud River ecosystem more accessible and immediate to those who can't experience it in person.

The Run4Salmon helps spread awareness about the Winnemem Wintu Tribe's project to reintroduce winter-run Chinook salmon to the McCloud River, using genetically descended stock that had been shipped to the Rakaia River in New Zealand in the 1940s. The winter-run Chinook is nearly extinct after being cut off from its upstream spawning grounds by the construction of the Shasta Dam. The effort is being undertaken in coordination with the Ngai Tahu Maori, the United States Bureau of Reclamation and the National Oceanic and Atmospheric Administration.

== Awards and honors ==
Garcia received the 2019 Emerging Leader award from environmental organization GreenLatinos. She was honored as one of the North American Association for Environmental Education's EE 30 Under 30. She was a member of the Women's Earth Alliance 2019 Grassroots Accelerator for Women Environmental Leaders.

The United Nations Environment Programme named Garcia one of its Young Champions of the Earth in 2020. As part of that award, she received $10,000 in funding for her work in indigenous-led conservation as well as access to specialized training.
