= Sander van der Leeuw =

American archeologist

Sander Ernst van der Leeuw
- Occupations: Archaeologist, historian, academic, and author
- Awards: UNEP Champion of the Earth for Science and Innovation

Academic background
- Education: BA, MLitt, PhD, and MA
- Alma mater: University of Amsterdam; University of Cambridge
- Thesis: Studies in the Technology of Ancient Pottery

Academic work
- Institutions: Arizona State University

Sander Ernst van der Leeuw is an American archaeologist, historian, academic, and author. He is an Emeritus Foundation Professor of Anthropology and Sustainability, Director Emeritus of the Julie Ann Wrigley Global Institute of Sustainability, and the Founding Director of School of Human Evolution and Social Change at Arizona State University.

Van der Leeuw is the author, co-author and (co-) editor of twenty books including, Social Sustainability, Past and Future: Undoing Unintended Consequences for the Earth's Survival, and The Model-Based Archaeology of Socio-Natural Systems and Complexity Perspectives on Innovation and Social Change. His research spans the fields of archaeology, sustainability, urbanization, and has particularly focused on complex system theory, innovation, intervention and ancient and modern interactions between humans and the environment.

Van der Leeuw is a Fellow of the American Association for the Advancement of Science, a Corresponding Member of the Royal Netherlands Academy of Arts and Sciences (since 1995), a Fellow of the Beijer Institute of Environmental Economics at Royal Swedish Academy of Sciences, the Global Climate Forum, and the European Center for Living Technology. He is also an Honorary Fellow of the Research Institute for Humanity and Nature, a Visiting Fellow of the Yukawa Institute for Theoretical Physics, and an External Faculty Fellow of the Santa Fe Institute.

== Education ==
Following his secondary education in Amsterdam, he enrolled in a Fulbright Exchange Studentship program at the University of Arizona in Tucson and took courses in Archaeology, Cultural Anthropology and History. Having moved back to Europe after a year, he pursued the degree equivalent of a BA in 1968 and an MA in 1972, and obtained an ABD (all but dissertation), in a double degree program in Medieval history and Prehistory in 1972 at the University of Amsterdam. Following that, he completed his Ph.D. in Prehistory (1976) at the same institution, became a Fulbright Post-Doctoral Research Fellow at the University of Michigan in Ann Arbor, and conducted research work in Anthropology as well as Archaeology. He also holds an MA from the University of Cambridge.

== Career ==
Van der Leeuw started his academic career at the Leiden University in 1972. He then held an appointment as an Assistant Lecturer at the University of Amsterdam in 1976, and was appointed as a Lecturer there in 1981. Having held that position till 1985, he next served as an Assistant Lecturer at Cambridge University and was promoted to Lecturer in 1988. Subsequently, he held an appointment as Professor at the Université de Paris 1 Panthéon-Sorbonne and joined the Arizona State University as a professor of anthropology in 2003. At ASU, he was appointed Foundation Professor of Anthropology in 2010 and Distinguished Sustainability Scientist in 2014. He held these concurrent positions at Arizona State University till 2021. Since 2022, he is the Emeritus Foundation Professor of Anthropology and Sustainability at the Arizona State University.

Van der Leeuw is the Founding Director of the School of Human Evolution & Social Change at ASU and has held an appointment there as the Dean of its School of Sustainability. Afterwards, he served as the Director of the Complex Adaptive Systems Initiative at ASU for more than a decade and was Director of the ASU-SFI Center for Biosocial Complex Systems from 2014 till 2021. As of 2016, he serves as the Director Emeritus of Julie Ann Wrigley Global Institute of Sustainability at ASU.

Van der Leeuw was the Secretary-General of the French National Council for the Coordination of the Humanities and Social Sciences from 2001 till 2003. Subsequently, he served as the Deputy director at the French National Institute for the Sciences of the Universe. This was followed by an appointment as the Chair of Archaeology at the Institut Universitaire de France from 2002 till 2007.

== Research ==
Van der Leeuw's research concerns the fields of archaeology, history, sustainability and socio-environmental issues, complex adaptive systems, ancient technologies, and urbanization. He has authored more than 200 peer-reviewed articles, and is the author or (co-)author or editor of 20 books, and was awarded the title of "Champion of the Earth for Science and Innovation" by the United Nations Environment Program (UNEP) in 2012.

=== Ceramic analysis and archaeology ===
Van der Leeuw first made contributions to the field of archaeology. As an archaeologist, he has conducted ethno-archaeological investigations in the Near East, the Philippines, and Mexico, as well as archaeological fieldwork in Syria, Holland, and France. His early career focused on exploring and examining ancient technologies, particularly the technology of pottery. In studying ceramics, he emphasized investigating the potter's point of view on the dynamic between the makers and their materials, developing a novel method of understanding ceramics. It investigated and considered potsherds from excavations as the result of a complex system of interactions between materials, techniques, logic, and the goals of the maker. While utilizing a similar approach to the investigation of traditional pottery making in the Philippines and Mexico, he also explored the economics of pottery making as well as innovations in traditional pottery-making techniques.

=== Complex adaptive systems ===
Van der Leeuw used the Complex Adaptive Systems (CAS) approach to address socio-environmental issues, technological advancements, and innovation. He has co-coordinated numerous research initiatives on socio-natural relations and environmental issues. Using the complex adaptive systems approach to study relationships between people and the environment, he coordinated the first field-based projects in sustainability studies ever undertaken from this perspective. Among these projects were ARCHAEOMEDES I (1992–1994) and ARCHAEOMEDES II (1996–1999), funded by European Union, which employed the CAS approach to examine and model the natural and anthropogenic causes of desertification and land degradation in all of the countries along the northern Mediterranean rim. The Environmental Communication project (1996–1988) investigated the challenges of communication between scientists and decision-makers whereas the MODULUS project (1997–1999) modeled and addressed land-use decision making from a complex systems approach. Later, applying a CAS approach on societal dynamics, he coordinated research on the relationship between innovation and urban dynamics in the project The Information Society as a Complex System. Regarding invention and innovation, his research particularly explored how the phenomenon of invention occurs, its prerequisites, the impact of context on its function as well as on the society. Later, he investigated similar phenomena in Phoenix for The Phoenix Innovation Project from 2006 till 2009. Among other things, his research showed that a lack of focus on multi-decadal temporal timescales is a key barrier to understanding the interaction between societal and environmental processes. Further, in order to model the future of complex land systems, he emphasized that there is a pressing need to rely on empirical data collected over a multi-decadal timescale.

=== Sustainability and urban dynamics ===
More recently, van der Leeuw has been concentrating his studies on exploring the lack of action by society despite having extensive knowledge on the climate system and ways to promote sustainability. He investigated whether technological improvements have the potential to change the trends and patterns that are endangering the Earth's current critical thresholds and tipping points. In an attempt to advance the understanding on the origin, and sustainability of biodiversity, his research contributed to highlighting the need to map the distribution of species in the biosphere and considered the role of academia in contributing to a shift towards sustainability.

Van der Leeuw's research on urbanization provided information on the current dimensions of the cities which permit or prevent effective cross-scale responses to disturbances. It illustrated that current urban dynamics are characterized by major factors, including changing diversity, connectedness, and modularity, as well as changing complexity. These factors are driven by the interaction of flows of information, energy and matter on which cities depend for their flourishing. Expanding on urban resilience, he argued that urban governance to harness urban innovation is needed in order to sustain the services provided by the ecosystem. Together with other academics, he also theorized a 3-Co model to explain the dynamics of green business transformation in an urban setting, and discussed the three key aspects of 3- Co model i.e., co-creation, co-evaluation, and co-governance. His research explained the effects of globalization on the resilience, vulnerability, and adaptability of socio-ecological systems. Areas of convergence between the two approaches of resilience and vulnerability, particularly from the perspective of their complementary and synergy, were also among the subjects of his research.

== Awards and honors ==
- 1963–1964 – I.I.E./Fulbright Undergraduate Scholarship, University of Arizona
- 1976–1977 – Fulbright Postdoctoral Research Scholarship, University of Michigan
- 1984 – Visiting Fellow, Department of Prehistory, Research School of Pacific Studies, Australian National University
- 1986–1996 – Fellow, Fitzwilliam College, Cambridge
- 1988–1992 – Fellow, Royal Anthropological Institute (UK)
- 1994–2000 – Fellow, McDonald Institute for Archaeological Research, Cambridge University
- 2002–2003 – Marion R. & Adolph J. Lichtstern Distinguished Research Scholar, University of Chicago, USA.
- 2002–2007 – Chair of Archaeology, "Institut Universitaire de France"
- 2012 – Champion of the Earth for Science and Innovation, United Nations Environment Program
- 2014 – Distinguished Sustainability Scientist, Arizona State University

== Bibliography ==
=== Selected books ===
- Studies in the Technology of Ancient Pottery (1976)
- Archaeological Approaches to the Study of Complexity (1981) ISBN 978-9994937813
- The Many Dimensions of Pottery: Ceramics in Archaeology and Anthropology (1984) ISBN 978-9070319076
- What's New?: A Closer Look at the Process of Innovation (1989) ISBN 978-0044451433
- The ARCHAEOMEDES project: Understanding the natural and anthropogenic causes of land degradation and desertification in the Mediterranean Basin Luxemburg: Office for Official Publications of the European Communities (1998) ISBN 978-9282832264
- Archéologie et systèmes socio-environnementaux: études multiscalaires sur la vallée du Rhône dans le programme ARCHAEOMEDES Valbonne: CNRS (Monographies du CRA) (2003) ISBN 978-2271061041
- Quelles natures voulons-nous? – pour une approche socio-écologique du champ de l'environnement (2003) ISBN 978-2842994549
- The Model-Based Archaeology of Socio-natural Systems: Santa Fe NM: School of Advanced Research (2007) ISBN 978-1930618879
- Complexity Perspectives on Innovation and Social Change Berlin: Springer (Methodos series) ISBN 978-1402096624
- Voyage dans l'archéologie spatiale anglo-saxonne (2016) ISBN 978-2848675671
- Social Sustainability, Past and Future: Undoing Unintended Consequences for the Earth's Survival (2019) ISBN 978-1108498692

=== Selected articles ===
- Young, O. R., Berkhout, F., Gallopin, G. C., Janssen, M. A., Ostrom, E., & van der Leeuw, S. (2006). The globalization of socio-ecological systems: an agenda for scientific research. Global environmental change, 16(3), 304–316.
- Rockström, J., Steffen, W., Noone, K., Persson, Å., Chapin, F. S., Lambin, E. F., ... & Foley, J. A. (2009). A safe operating space for humanity. Nature, 461(7263), 472–475.
- Miller, F., Osbahr, H., Boyd, E., Thomalla, F., Bharwani, S., Ziervogel, G., ... & Nelson, D. (2010). Resilience and vulnerability: complementary or conflicting concepts?. Ecology and Society, 15(3).
- Ernstson, H., Van der Leeuw, S. E., Redman, C. L., Meffert, D. J., Davis, G., Alfsen, C., & Elmqvist, T. (2010). Urban transitions: on urban resilience and human-dominated ecosystems. Ambio, 39(8), 531–545.
- Westley, F., Olsson, P., Folke, C., Homer-Dixon, T., Vredenburg, H., Loorbach, D., ... & Van Der Leeuw, S. (2011). Tipping toward sustainability: emerging pathways of transformation. Ambio, 40(7), 762–780.
- Brovkin, V., Brook, E., Williams, J. W., Bathiany, S., Lenton, T. M., Barton, M., ... & Yu, Z. (2021). Past abrupt changes, tipping points and cascading impacts in the Earth system. Nature Geoscience, 14(8), 550–558.
- van der Leeuw, S.E., Folke, C., (2021) "The social dynamics of basins of attraction", (Special issue: Beyond social-ecological traps: fostering transformations towards sustainability, H. Eriksson, J.L. Blythe, H. Österblom, and P. Olsson, eds.) Ecology & Society 26(1): 33
- Barton, C. M., Lee, A., Janssen, M. A., van der Leeuw, S., Tucker, G. E., Porter, C., ... & Jagers, H. R. (2022). How to make models more useful. Proceedings of the National Academy of Sciences, 119(35), e2202112119.
