= Paul Newman (disambiguation) =

Paul Newman (1925–2008) was an American actor.

Paul Newman may also refer to:

- Paul Newman (politician) (born 1954), Arizona politician
- Paul Newman (cricketer) (born 1959), English cricketer
- Paul Newman (linguist) (born 1937), American linguist
- Paul S. Newman (1924–1999), American comic book writer
- Paul Newman (band), an Austin, Texas band
- Paul Newman (engineer), British academic
- Paul Newman (accountant), American accountant
- Tall Paul (DJ) (Paul Newman, born 1971), English DJ

== See also ==
- Paul Neumann (disambiguation)
- Newman (disambiguation)
