= Fabian Leendertz =

German biologist

Fabian Hubertus Leendertz
- Born: November 11, 1972 (age 53); Krefeld, West Germany
- Education: Free University of Berlin; University of Bayreuth
- Known for: Research on Chimpanzee diseases; One Health; COVID-19 origin research
- Awards: Champions of the Earth (2020)
- Scientific career
- Fields: Biology, Veterinary medicine, Zoonosis
- Workplaces: Robert Koch Institute; Helmholtz Institute for One Health; University of Greifswald

Fabian Hubertus Leendertz (born 11 November 1972 in Krefeld) is a German biologist, veterinarian, and expert on zoonosis, specialising his research on primates, studying leprosy and anthrax in chimpanzees since 2014.

== Biography ==
Leendertz studied biology at the University of Bayreuth from 1992 to 1995 and began studying veterinary medicine at the University of Veterinary Science in Budapest in 1995. He continued his studies at the Free University of Berlin (FU) from 1996 and completed them in 2000. In the same year, he received his veterinary license.

For his doctoral thesis at the Free University of Berlin, Leendertz conducted research from 2000 to 2005 in collaboration with the Robert Koch Institute in Berlin and the Max Planck Institute for Evolutionary Anthropology in Leipzig on the topic of diseases in wild chimpanzees. During this time, he also spent 14 consecutive months in the Taï National Park in southwestern Ivory Coast.

In 2020, he was appointed to the team researching the origins of COVID-19 by the World Health Organization, and was awarded a Champions of the Earth award by the United Nations. In 2021, he began a project group researching epidemiology and pathogenicity at the Robert Koch Institute, was appointed founding director of the Helmholtz Institute for One Health, and started a professorship at the University of Greifswald.
