= Heba Al-Farra =

Palestinian environmentalist

Heba Mohammed Al-Farra is a Libyan-born-Palestinian environmentalist who is based in Kuwait and is the founder of Women in Energy and Environment Organization. In 2018, she was the East Asia winner of the Young Champions of the Earth award.

== Early life ==
Al-Farra was born in Libya to a Palestinian mother who is a medical doctor. She grew up in the Gaza Strip, lacking sufficient running water or electricity.

== Education ==
Al-Farra obtained her bachelor's degree in environmental engineering from the University of Gaza in 2012. She has a certificate in organisational management from Florida State University, and became a certified LEED Green Associate in 2017.

== Career ==
In 2018, Al-Farra worked at Enertech Management Consulting Company, as a Environmental Training and Development Specialist. Prior to that she was an Environmental Consultant at Enertech Holding Company and also at the Kuwait Scientific Center. She is the founder of the Women in Energy and Environment Organization.

== Award ==
In 2018 she was a Young Champions of the Earth winner for East Asia for her efforts to encourage women to work in the sustainable energy sector.

== Family life ==
Al-Farra moved to Kuwait in 2012, where she lives with her husband and two sons.
