= Supriya Sahu =

Indian public official

Supriya Sahu IAS
- Born: 27 July 1968 (age 58)
- Education: University of Lucknow
- Occupation: Indian Administrative Service
- Organization(s): Entrepreneurship Development and Innovation Institute
- Title: Current:* Entrepreneurship Development and Innovation Institute Previous:* Additional Chief Secretary to Government, Environment, Climate Change and Forests Department, Tamil Nadu: Addl. Chief Secretary, Department of Health, Tamil Nadu; Chief Executive Officer, IndcoSERVE; Director-General, Doordarshan; Co-Vice President, Asia-Pacific Broadcasting Union; Joint Secretary, Ministry of Information & Broadcasting
- Spouse: N. Muruganandam IAS

Supriya Sahu (born 27 July 1968) is an Indian public official belonging to the 1991 batch of the Indian Administrative Service. She is also a recipient of UNEP's 2025 Champions of the Earth Award, the highest environmental honour of the United Nations. She's currently working in Entrepreneurship Development and Innovation Institute of the Tamil Nadu Government.

She was earlier the Additional Chief Secretary of the Department of Environment, Climate Change and Forests and also the Department of Health and Family Welfare. Previously, she also assumed additional responsibilities as Principal Secretary-cum-Managing Director of The Tamil Nadu Small Tea Growers' Industrial Cooperative Tea Factories' Federation Limited (INDCOSERVE), Coonoor. Before that, Sahu served as the Director-General of Doordarshan from July 2016 to September 2017. Additionally, she was elected as the Co-Vice President of the Asian Broadcasting Union during the 55th General Assembly of ABU.

== Career ==
In the earlier phase of her career, she held the position of Joint Secretary at the Ministry of Information & Broadcasting, Government of India. Prior to her transfer to the central government, she worked as an Additional Collector in the Vellore district and served as the managing director of the Tamil Nadu State AIDS Control Society (TANSACS).

On October 25, 2016, she was elected and appointed vice-president of the Asia-Pacific Broadcasting Union. She assumed the role of Acting President of the Asia-Pacific Broadcasting Union (ABU), which she handed over to the new president in October 2018. She was the first female vice-president of the ABU.

In February 2016, she was chosen by Prasar Bharati, the public service broadcaster of India, to serve as the Director General of the state broadcaster, Doordarshan. Subsequently, the broadcaster recommended her name to the Ministry of Information & Broadcasting (I&B) for approval. Sahu had previously held the position of director at the I&B ministry and was later promoted to the post of Joint Secretary.

=== Environment and Climate Change ===
She currently holds the position of Additional Chief Secretary in the Department of Environment, Climate Change, and Forests. After the prohibition on plastic bag usage in Tamil Nadu, Ms Sahu initiated a campaign called "Meendum Manjapai" to encourage people to adopt the use of cloth bags. These bags aim to motivate individuals to bid farewell to single-use plastics. The Chief Minister of Tamil Nadu, M K Stalin, inaugurated the campaign. To bring about grassroots-level changes in combating climate change, Tamil Nadu is transforming 10 villages into climate-smart villages. This initiative aims to promote the utilization of solar energy, as well as methods for treating and reusing wastewater, among other initiatives. Furthermore, Tamil Nadu has introduced a 10-month mentorship program for women to enhance their understanding of climate change and enable them to work on initiatives that mitigate its impact in their respective areas of influence. She has been instrumental in advancing one of India's most ambitious ecological restoration and climate resilience programmes. Under her leadership, the state notified over 7,000 hectares as new Reserve Forests, secured 19 additional Ramsar sites (taking the total from one to 20), and established seven new wildlife sanctuaries, including India's first Dugong Conservation Reserve and Slender Loris Sanctuary. She is spearheading Tamil Nadu's Green Missions—including the Green Tamil Nadu Mission, Climate Change Mission, Wetlands Mission, and the Tamil Nadu Coastal Restoration Mission—coordinated through the Tamil Nadu Green Climate Company, India's first not-for-profit state climate vehicle. These efforts have led to the plantation of over 108 million trees, restoration of 3,610 hectares of mangroves, and expansion of forest and tree cover by nearly 1,000 km^{2} between 2021 and 2023.

Sahu has placed special emphasis on community-based conservation, including the formation of Village Mangrove Councils and the employment of over 200 tribal youth as eco-tourism guides under the Trek TN initiative. She has also championed the restoration of degraded coastal ecosystems and coral reefs, notably in Ennore and the Gulf of Mannar, and established a ₹50 crore Endangered Species Conservation Fund to protect lesser-known species like the Nilgiri Tahr and Slender Loris. Her efforts have brought Tamil Nadu international recognition, including a feature in Channel News Asia's documentary series Future Proofers.

==== Pallikaranai Ramsar Issue ====
In October 2025, Arrapor Iyakkam, an NGO based out of Chennai, reported that clearance has been given for construction of a high rise by Brigade Constructions in Ramsar marsh lands near Perumbakkam, Chennai by the Environment, Climate Change and Forest Department, headed by Sahu. The NGO accused that clearance has been given inside the ecologically sensitive area and also submitted a 213-page annexure of evidence. After this report, the Madras High Court passed an order to halt the construction stating that the construction violated wetland protection laws. Later, the then Government of Tamil Nadu issued a clarification that approvals have been given on private patta lands and that no permission has been granted within the protected area. The state government also clarified that the National Centre for Sustainable Coastal Management, an autonomous body under the Government of India, is in the process of creating an Integrated Management Plan (IMP) for the site and delineating boundaries, which will permit or regulate activities on the site. Arappor Iyakkam, the original complainant then questioned the government and it's authorities why permissions were granted for a private construction company to operate in marsh land sites that are not yet allocated for private use and it was illegal to do so. In February 2026, the High Court dismissed the PILs filed by AIADMK Legal Wing and Arappor Iyakkam citing "that the process of demarcating the Ramsar boundaries for the Pallikaranai marsh was yet to be completed." On 18th June 2026, CMDA and SEIAA of TN government found the land indeed were marked as Ramsar site and revoked the environmental clearance that was earlier granted halting any further construction.

=== The INDCOSERVE ===
As managing director, INDCOSERVE, Sahu led the transformation of cooperative through initiatives to enhance the income of tea growers and increasing tea cooperatives' brand recognition. Nearly 30,000 small tea growers are likely to benefit from the initiative. Cooperative also started the practice of fixing in advance the green tea leaf prices grown by the small tea growers. Tea farmers received an all-time high price for green leaves in August 2020.

For marketing of the tea produced by the farmers' cooperative, Sahu started a unique initiative called 'Tea Vandis' where the produce is marketed by tribes of The Nilgiris district. Under this initiative, INDCOSERVE provides a food truck to Toda tribal communities. Currently, four 'Vandis' are operational at different vantage points in Ooty district. Sahu inaugurated 'INDCO Tea House' to popularise and market variety of tea manufactured by farmers' cooperative.

The cooperative launched six new tea manufacturers - Nilgiris Kahwa Tea, Honey Hill Tea, Marlimund Tea, Bedford Tea, Mountain Rose Gold Tea and Ooty Gold Tea. Earlier, INDCOSERVE advertised only mud-grade tea or Ooty Tea. These products will also be sold through e-commerce platforms Amazon and Flipkart.

The cooperative also launched a drive to rope in small tea farmers to adopt organic farming by launching 'Scope Certification', at the Kinnakorai Industrial Cooperative. After continuously practicing organic farming for three years, farmers will be awarded 'organic certificate' for their tea produce. It has been widely reported that several factories of INDCOSERVE turned profit in last two years since Ms Sahu joined the organisation.

=== Doordarshan ===
==== Revenue ====
During Sahu's tenure as Director-General of Doordarshan, the public broadcaster's revenues increased to Rs 827.51 crores during the financial year 2016–17. It surpassed its annual target of Rs 800 crore and posted a growth of Rs 318.06 crore compared to the previous financial year. To increase its revenue, Doordarshan started adopting new strategies including the auction of slots on DD Freedish and planned to auction its prime time slots. In 2018, Doordarshan also recorded its top viewership on Republic Day i.e. 38 million viewers on a single day. In April 2019, she announced that Doordarshan had recorded its highest revenue in the last five years, was no longer a loss-making organisation. In 2014–15, Doordarshan reported a net collection of Rs 884.2 crore, whereas in 2018–19, it hasgone up to Rs 943.8 crore.

==== Programming ====
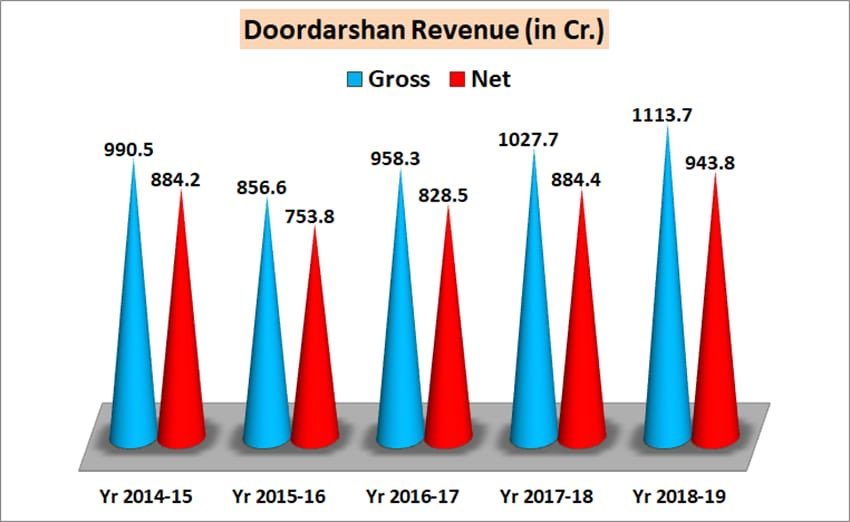

Besides, Doordarshan has started various new programming initiatives under her leadership. It includes Doordarshan launching two new science channels i.e. DD Science and India Science. These channels aim to boost scientific temperament among the people. Two channels will have science-based documentaries, studio-based discussions, virtual walkthroughs of scientific institutions, interviews and short films and will be free to access. In December 2018, Supriya Sahu launched DD Roshni, an educational channel as part of its partnership with Bruhat Bengaluru Mahanagara Palike and Microsoft. DD has launched 'Mahila Kisan Awards', a reality show that tells the stories of unsung women heroes of Indian agriculture.

Doordarshan also launched Kashmiri version of Kaun Banega Crorepati, which will be broadcast on DD Kashir with vernacular name Kus Bani Koshur Karorpaet. The show will be produced by Studio Next of Sony Pictures who hold the licence to produce the KBC format in India.

==== New technology ====
Under Sahu's leadership, Doordarshan started digital terrestrial transmission (DTT) and is planning to expand the services to 16 cities by 2017. There were reports in January 2018 that Doordarshan was planning to develop its own Over-the-Top (OTT) content platform to reach out to audiences across the globe. Doordarshan was said to be in talks with other content platforms to put their content out in public.

=== Community Radio ===
She has also been credited for giving a shape and direction to India's Community Radio movement. It was under her leadership that Community Radio was included in the 12th Five Year Plan of India. During her period, the Ministry of I&B, opened the doors and increased engagement with the Community Radio sector. Her initiatives include annual National Community Radio Sammelan - the annual conclave of stations, and an annual publication on the work of Community Radio stations - Community Radio Compendium. Second National Community Radio Sammelan also saw the use of social media by the government, when the ministry of I&B live-tweeted the event on Twitter.

=== HIV/ AIDS and Tuberculosis ===
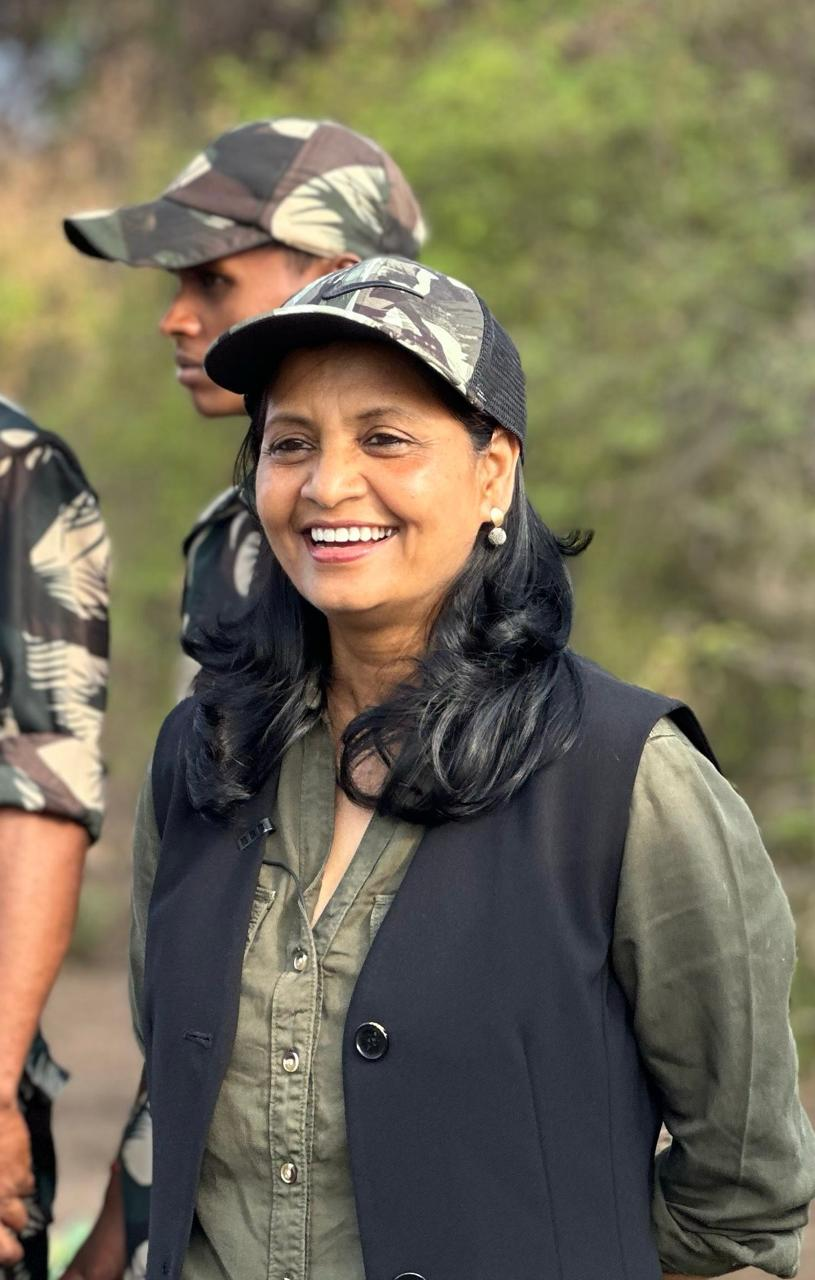
Supriya Sahu, Additional Chief Secretary, Government of Tamil Nadu during a field visit

She has also spearheaded Tamil Nadu's HIV and tuberculosis programmes. As Project Director, Tamil Nadu State AIDS Control Society, she initiated the integrated TB and HIV testing programme in the state. During her tenure, the state started providing a comprehensive package of HIV/AIDS services to private maternity hospitals in the state in an effort to match services provided at government-run maternity hospitals. It included counseling, treatment, the prevention of mother-to-child transmission and managing HIV/TB coinfection. In 2006, she launched a joint initiative for orphaned and vulnerable children affected by HIV/AIDS. In 2008, during her tenure as PD of TANSACS, she took the lead in enabling sensitisation of the police department across cadres and districts of Tamil Nadu on issues of groups marginalised on account of their sexuality and gender identity. This successful programme was carried out with the involvement of community members involved in the HIV/AIDS targeted intervention programme working with men who have sex with men (MSM) and transgender women (TG).

=== Operation Blue Mountain Campaign ===
She is known for her pioneering work in protecting the environment in Nilgiris district of Tamil Nadu. She led a campaign known as 'Operation Blue Mountain', to ban the use of plastic in the district. She has been hailed as a hands-on collector for Operation Blue Mountain in the Nilgiris to cleanse the environment of the plastic menace. The campaign was crucial to unclog the river sources and springs in the popular hill station of Nilgiris. Her experiment with Nilgiris has been documented by erstwhile Planning Commission and UNDP as a best practice on governance from Indian states. As Collector of Nilgiris district, Sahu led a campaign to mark 'International Year of the Mountains, 2002". This included the creation of a world record by planting trees in one or several of the degraded shola forests. On 24 June 2003, people of Nilgiris under the leadership of Supriya Sahu planted 42,182 trees — breaking the existing Guinness World Record by a large margin.

== See also ==
- Doordarshan
- The Nilgiris District
- Community Radio
- Ministry of Information and Broadcasting (India)
