= Sonika Manandhar =

Nepali engineer and entrepreneur

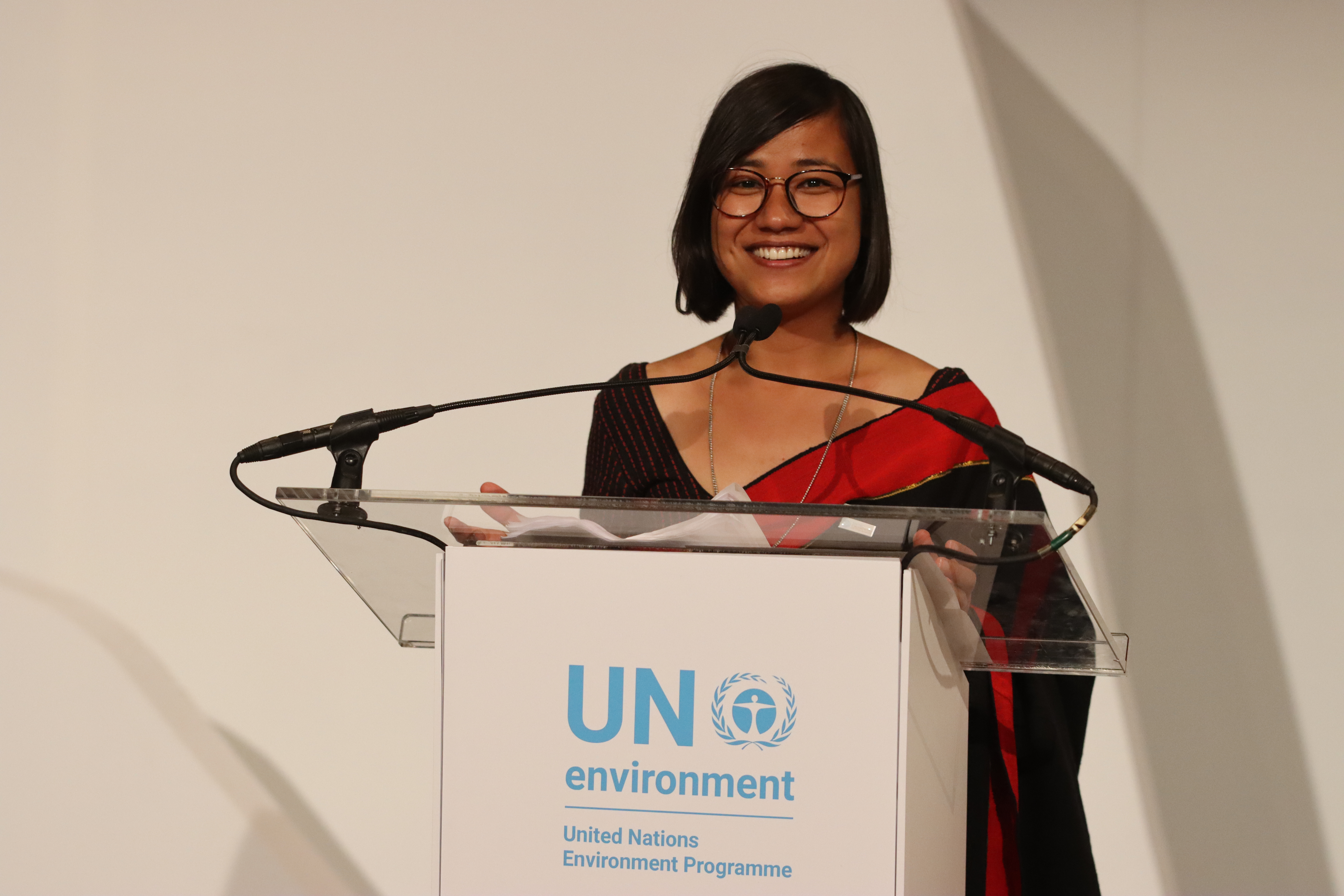
- Born: Kathmandu, Nepal
- Education: Tribhuvan University, Singularity University, Korea Aerospace Research Institute
- Occupations: Computer engineer, entrepreneur
- Title: Co-founder and CTO of Aeloi
- Parent(s): Shankha Narayana Manandhar, Joog Laxmi Shrestha
- Awards: United Nations Young Champion of the Earth, One Young World Lead 2030, National Geographic Society Emerging Explorer, Rastriya Nari Sewa Samman 2073

Sonika Manandhar is a Nepali computer engineer and a social entrepreneur. She co-founded a fintech company named Aeloi Technologies, an organization that helps fund women micro-entrepreneurs using digital tokens. She received the award "Young Champions of the Earth" from the United Nations Environment Programme's in 2019 and the National Geographic Society 2020 Emerging Explorer.

== Early life and education ==
Manandhar was born in Kathmandu, Nepal. She graduated as a computer engineer from Kathmandu Engineering College, Tribhuvan University, and started working at Microsoft Innovation Center Nepal as a software engineer in 2011. Manandhar is a Singularity University Alumni and Korea Aerospace Research Institute Alumni. In 2017, she was the first Nepali who was offered a scholarship to go to the Silicon Valley–based program called Global Solutions Program at NASA in California. During her time at Singularity University, she studied exponential technologies such as robotics, artificial intelligence, blockchain, etc. Her company was selected among three companies to pitch at Singularity University Global Summit in Silicon Valley. Manandhar was also offered a scholarship to attend the International Space Training at Korea Aerospace Research Institute in 2018.

Manandhar has also been an advocate for blind students and has worked to empower blind children with computer education. She established a computer lab in 2013 and was involved in finding new ways of teaching a computer to blind students.

== Awards and recognitions ==
In 2019, Manandhar was named as Young Champions of Earth by the United Nations Environment Programme (UNEP).

The UN Environment Programme listed her as one of the six examples of climate leadership on Women's Day alongside Christiana Figueres, Greta Thunberg, Anne Hidalgo, Carolina Schmidt, and Kibarisho Leintoi. She also was the winner of the SDG 9: Infrastructure, industry, and innovation category award of the Lead 2030 Challenge by One Young World sponsored by Standard Chartered with seed funding of $50,000.

In 2020, Sonika Manandhar was named National Geographic Society’s Emerging Explorer 2020. National Geographic Society chooses eight global representatives of their respective field to award them.
