= Nzambi Matee =

Kenyan engineer, activist and environmentalist

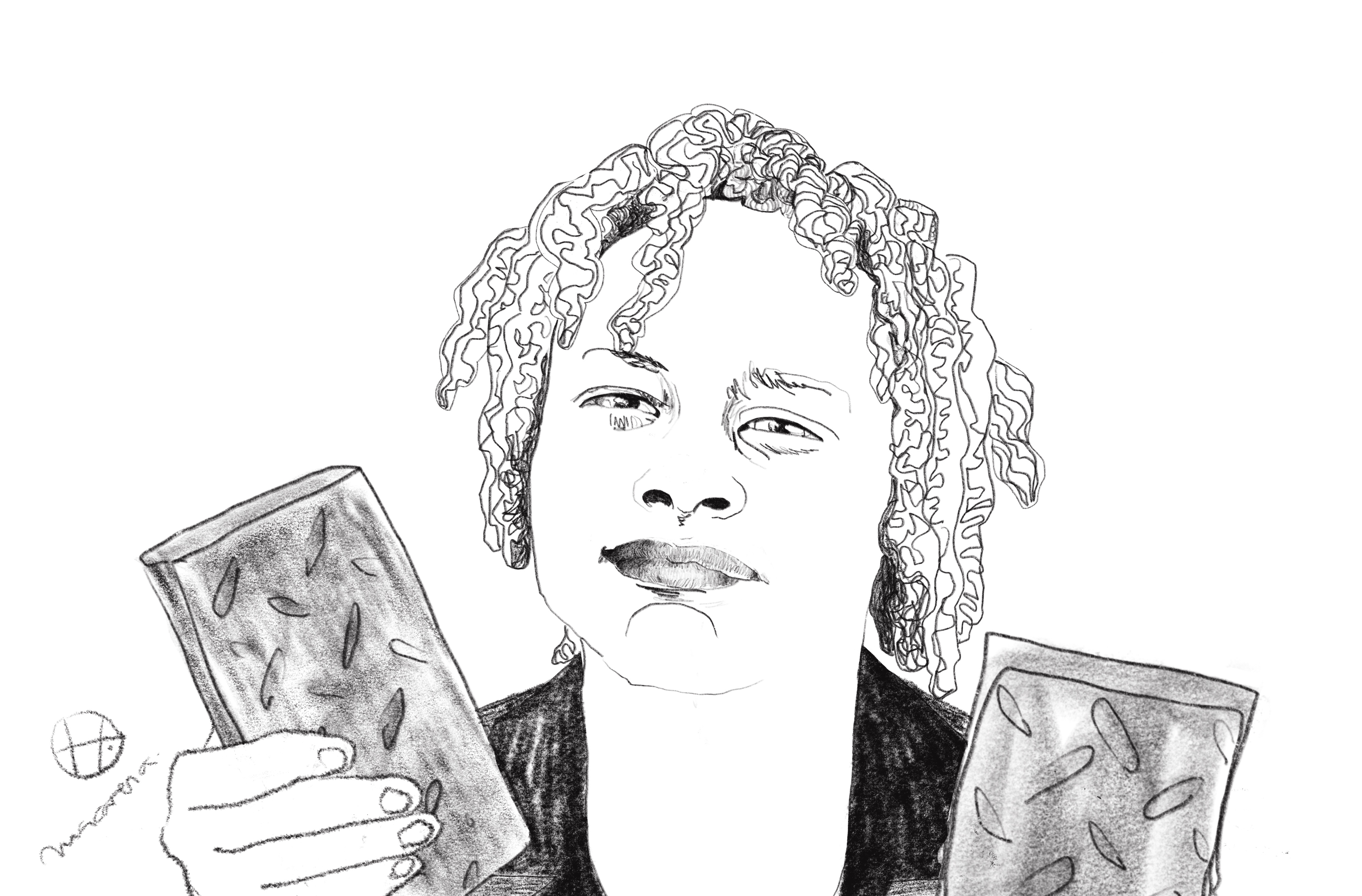
- Born: 19 September 1992 (age 33); Nairobi Kenya
- Occupations: engineer, activist and environmentalist
- Organization: Gjenge Makers
- Known for: recycling plastic to make bricks

Nzambi Matee (born September 19, 1992) is a Kenyan mechanical engineer, environmentalist, hardware designer, inventor, and entrepreneur. She is known for her innovative and creative ways of converting waste into sustainable materials. She pioneered the sustainable efforts by recycling plastic to make bricks that can be even stronger than a concrete. Her sustainable efforts have also been hailed as one of the successful strategies to curb the plastic pollution in Kenya. She founded Gjenge Makers, which is based in Nairobi, Kenya.

== Career ==
She pursued her interest in physics and material engineering. She also worked as an engineer in the oil industry of Kenya.

In 2017, she decided to quit her job as a data analyst to focus on sustainability and waste management. She eventually made arrangements to set up a small laboratory in her mother's backyard. She began creating and testing pavers, and she waited for about a year to develop the right ratios for her paving bricks. Furthermore, she developed the first brick from plastic waste in 2018, and a year later, in 2019, she made her own self-made machine to convert plastic waste to bricks on a large scale.

She also confronted a few challenges as her neighbors complained about the noisy machine, which she utilized for her efforts. Matee also stopped associating with her friends for a year, and it was a brief stop in her social life while she was determined to carry out her mission. She won a scholarship to attend a social entrepreneurship training programme in the United States of America. During her short tour to the US, she used the material labs in the University of Colorado Boulder to test and refine the ratios of sand to plastic.

She founded the startup company Gjenge Makers in order to recycle plastic waste into bricks. She used her own experience of design thinking when establishing the Gjenge Makers foundation. She was heavily inspired to set up Gjenge Makers after witnessing the plastic bags being untidily scattered along the streets of Nairobi. She designed her own machines at the Gjenge Makers factory, and her factory has recycled around 20 tonnes of waste plastics as of 2021.

She was recognised at the United Nations Environment Programme with the prestigious honour Young Champion of the Earth 2020 Africa winner.
