= List of school climate strikes =

The list of school climate strikes lists school student strikes associated with the school strike for climate movement. The strikes began on 20 August 2018, when Swedish schoolgirl Greta Thunberg went on strike daily for several weeks, before switching to striking every Friday. The days of the largest strikes worldwide have been on 15 March 2019 (over a million people), 20 September 2019 (four million people) and 27 September 2019 (two million people). These September 2019 climate strikes were estimated to have involved up to 7.6 million people globally.

The strikes have grown to include people of all ages and from all walks of life, including scientists, politicians, and celebrities.

== List ==
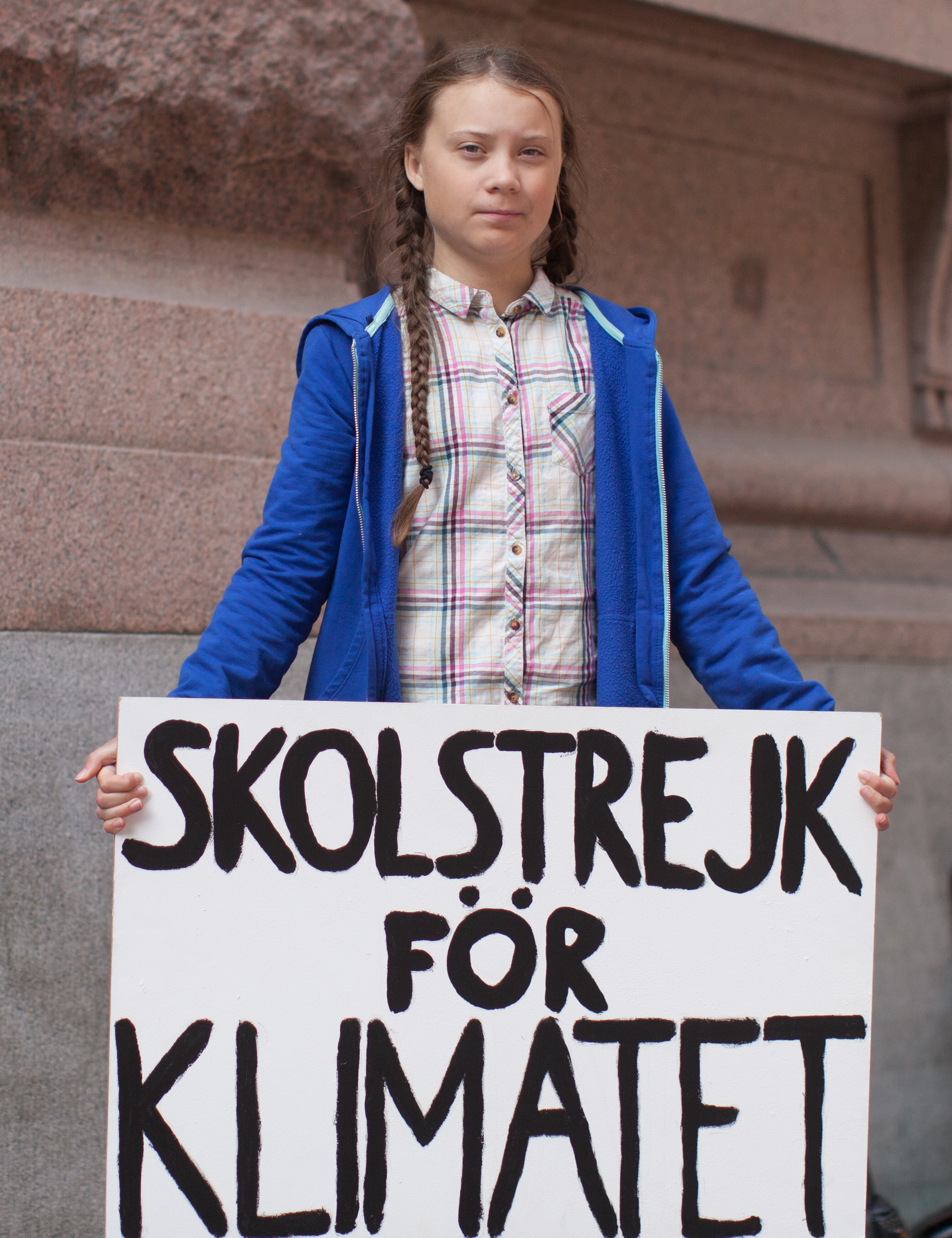
Greta Thunberg

List of student strikes for climate action
Date	Country	Cities	Participants	Comments
20 August 2018	Sweden	Stockholm	1	Daily until 9 September 2018, then every Friday, started by Greta Thunberg
4 September 2018	Netherlands	The Hague	1–5	1–5 participants, daily until 21 September 2018, in front of the House of Representatives
14 September 2018	Germany	Berlin		In front of the Bundestag each Friday since this date, originally initiated by cultural manager and activist Barbara Fischer
21 September 2018	Netherlands	Zeist	1	10-year-old Lilly Platt begins weekly climate strikes
2 November 2018	Canada	Sudbury	1	6th grader Sophia Mathur begins weekly strikes
20 November 2018	Belgium	Brussels	300+	Climate Academy students from the European School Brussels II in front of the European Commission
28 November 2018	Australia	Multiple cities	1700	Participants included 200 outside parliament in Canberra. Australian Senate had approved motion to support the student action on 27 November 2018.
30 November 2018	Australia	30 locations	15000	Named 'Strike for Climate Action'
7 December 2018	Canada	Vancouver	50	
7 December 2018	England (UK)	London	12	
14 December 2018	Germany	Berlin, Göttingen, Hamburg, Kiel, Köln, Karlsruhe	200+ (all locations)	Several dozens of participants in Hamburg, 150 pupils in Berlin, unknown number in other cities. Named Fridays for Future: Klimastreik
14 December 2018	Sweden	Malmö		Greta Thunberg joining a Malmö climate demonstration on her way home from Katowice
14 December 2018	Switzerland	Zurich	500	
14 December 2018	United States	New York	1	US student Alexandria Villaseñor begins weekly Friday picketing at the United Nations
21 December 2018	Switzerland	Basel, Bern, St. Gallen, Zurich	4000	Named Klimastreik in German and grève du climat in French
21 December 2018	England (UK)	Corsham	4	Ellida Dilley was directly inspired by Thunberg
4 January 2019	United States	Denver and New York City	3	Haven Coleman begins Friday protests in Denver; Zayne Cowie continues at NY city hall; Villaseñor continues at UN HQ.
10 January 2019	Belgium	Brussels	3000	The Belgium movement 'Youth for Climate' organises strikes on Thursdays
11 January 2019	Finland	Helsinki	Hundreds	"Hundreds" of participants. Named Ilmastolakko / Klimatstrejk
11 January 2019	Canada	Waterloo	30	First "Fridays for Future" strike for Waterloo
11 January 2019	Scotland (UK)	Fort William	1	13-year-old Holly Gillibrand is also an Extinction Rebellion activist
11 January 2019	Ireland	Cork	1	Started with one student, Saoi O'Connor, and has steadily been gaining support since her first strike, alone, in early January.
17 January 2019	Belgium	Brussels and Antwerp	12750	
18 January 2019	Switzerland	15 locations	22000	Nobel laureate Jacques Dubochet joined the demonstration in Lausanne
18 January 2019	Germany	50 locations	25000	Fridays for Future Germany
24 January 2019	Belgium	Brussels	35000	Activists gathered around the European Parliament
25 January 2019	Switzerland	Davos	30	With Greta Thunberg, who was invited to the World Economic Forum
25 January 2019	Germany	Berlin	10000	Fridays for Future Germany
27 January 2019	Belgium	Brussels	70000	related more general demonstration for climate
31 January 2019	Belgium	Liège, Brussels, Leuven, Charleroi, Chimay, Tournai	33000	The city of Liège supports it and accepts absence of students on this day
1 February 2019	United States	Washington, D.C.	1	Jerome Foster II begins weekly Friday protests at the front gates of the White House, while also interning for Congressman John Lewis directly afterwards.
1 February 2019	Germany	25 locations	12000	Fridays for Future Germany
2 February 2019	Switzerland	13 locations	65000	Demonstration on Saturday, organised by the 'Climate Strike' movement
7 February 2019	Netherlands	The Hague, Groningen	10000–30000	
7 February 2019	Belgium	Leuven, Brussels, Arlon, Antwerp, Kortrijk, Hasselt, Herve, Mons, Liège	20000	
8 February 2019	Germany	50 locations	21000	1000 pupils in Flensburg (organized by 18-year old Jakob Blasel), 1000 pupils in Regensburg, 1500 in Passau, 200 in Landau, 1300 in Garmisch-Partenkirchen, 130 in Halle, etc.
8 February 2019	Austria	Salzburg	100	
8 February 2019	France	Nantes	150	First School Strike for Climate in France
13 February 2019	Ireland	Dublin	400	Organised by sixth-class students from Donabate Portrane Educate Together
14 February 2019	Netherlands	Multiple cities	100–500	100–500 participants, Both high-school students and undergraduate students participating. Weekly in Amsterdam, Nijmegen and Groningen
14 February 2019	Belgium	Brussels	11000	
15 February 2019	Canada	Montreal	Hundreds	
15 February 2019	France	Paris	1000	First School Strike for Climate in Paris
15 February 2019	Germany	Over 35 locations	26000	
15 February 2019	Italy	Bolzano	4000	
15 February 2019	United Kingdom	60 locations	15000	Coordinated by Youth Strike 4 Climate
15 February 2019	United States	Denver, CO; Tisbury, MA; New York	9	In DC, Foster continues solo strikes;OC Coleman continues solo strikes.; Y, Villaseñor joined by other students for the first time. In Tisbury MA, brothers Runar Finn (11) and Odin Robinson (9).
21 February 2019	Belgium	Brussels, Ghent, Genk, Turnhout	15500	Thunberg joined the Brussels strike after addressing the EU.
22 February 2019	France	Paris	Thousands	
22 February 2019	Ireland	Dublin, Cork, Maynooth	100	weekly strikes continuing, with action at Dáil Éireann attended by about 100
22 February 2019	Iceland	Reykjavík	Hundreds	Hundreds of people gathered in Reykjavík to protest climate change in the first climate strike of Iceland. The strikers were mostly students, but other people were welcome to join as well.
27 February 2019	Belgium	Ghent	600	
28 February 2019	Belgium	Antwerp, Huy, Brussels, Mechelen, Dinant, Liège	12500	Thunberg joined the Antwerp strike.
1 March 2019	Norway	Multiple locations	Thousands	"Thousands" in first widespread school strike in Norway
1 March 2019	Canada	Sudbury	12	Strikers win letter of support from 80 staff and faculty at Laurentian University
1 March 2019	Iceland	Reykjavík	200	The second strike in Iceland since 22 February.
7 March 2019	Belgium	Louvain-La-Neuve, Antwerp, Mechelen	4200	3900 to 4200 strikers in Louvain-la-Neuve and 250 demonstrators in Antwerp.
8 March 2019	Iceland and United States	Reykjavík and Washington, D.C.	400	The third strike in Iceland since 22 February. It took place at Austurvöllur In Washington, D.C., Jerome Foster joined by other students for the first time.
14 March 2019	Netherlands	Amsterdam	5000-6000	
14 March 2019	Norway	Bergen	3000+	
15 March 2019	New Zealand	Auckland, Wellington, Christchurch, Dunedin, and others	Thousands including 2000 at New Zealand Parliament	Strikers win the support of Prime Minister Jacinda Ardern, Minister for Climate Change James Shaw, Greens Co-Leader Marama Davidson, and the mayor of Auckland, Phil Goff. The rally in Christchurch at Cathedral Square ended early due to the Christchurch mosque shootings nearby.
15 March 2019	Australia	Nationwide, 60 locations	150000	Estimated 20000 students in Sydney, 10000 students in Brisbane
15 March 2019	Japan	Tokyo	130	130 people marched through the Aoyama, Harajuku & Shibuya districts of Tokyo
15 March 2019	South Korea	Seoul	100+	
15 March 2019	China	Hong Kong	1000	About 1000 students marched to the Central Government Offices
15 March 2019	Thailand	Bangkok	30–60	Led by 11-year-old Lily
15 March 2019	Philippines	Nationwide, at least 9 locations	Hundreds	About 150 strikers in Bukidnon alone.
15 March 2019	India	Hyderabad, Delhi, Gurgaon	1200+	300-700 strike in Hyderabad at the Kasu Brahmananda Reddy National Park, 500 in Delhi and 400 in Gurgaon
15 March 2019	Russia	Moscow	40	About 40 strikers gathered at Sokolniki Park in Moscow. Other protests were also planned in Saint Petersburg, Novosibirsk, Surgut and Krasnoyarsk, but these were not allowed by the government. As an alternative to striking, Russian students and other supporters showed their solidarity via social media. Every Friday since then, local student Arshak Makichyan has been striking alone on Pushkinskaya Square.
15 March 2019	Ukraine	Kyiv, Kharkiv, Dnipro	100+	
15 March 2019	Cyprus	Nicosia	Hundreds	
15 March 2019	Greece	Mainly in Athens and Thessaloniki	500+	Approximately 400 students in Athens, at least 50 in Thessaloniki. Protests also took place in Agios Nikolaos, Crete
15 March 2019	Finland	Helsinki	3000	
15 March 2019	Sweden	Nationwide, 144 locations	16000	Estimated 7000 to 15000 students in Stockholm (Greta Thunberg was present), 500 in Uppsala
15 March 2019	Iceland	Reykjavík	1000	The fourth strike in Iceland since 22 February.
15 March 2019	Latvia	Riga	Hundreds	A couple of hundred people marching from Vērmane Garden to Riga City Council and then to Saeima.
15 March 2019	Poland	Warsaw and nationwide	2500+	2000 in Warsaw, 350 in Kraków and 200 participants in Katowice according to police
15 March 2019	Czech Republic	Prague, Brno, Liberec	1000+	first Czech climate strike
15 March 2019	Slovakia	Bratislava, Košice, Žilina and Liptovský Mikuláš	1000	
15 March 2019	Croatia	Zagreb & Split	2000	1000 in Zagreb and 1000 in Split
15 March 2019	Slovenia	Ljubljana & 6 other locations	11000	9000 in Ljubljana
15 March 2019	Germany	Nationwide, 230 locations	300000	Estimated 25000 students in Berlin, 10000 in Munich, 10000 in Cologne, 6000 in Frankfurt, 5000 in Bremen, 2000 in Düsseldorf, 1800 in Potsdam
15 March 2019	Denmark	Copenhagen	10000	Over 10000 in Copenhagen
15 March 2019	Netherlands	Maastricht	2000	
15 March 2019	Belgium	Nationwide, 34 locations	50000	Estimated 30000 students in Brussels, 3000 in Louvain-la-Neuve, 2000 in Mons, 2000 in Philippeville, 1000 in Wavre, 800 in Liege
15 March 2019	Luxembourg	Nationwide	15000	Estimated 15000 students in Luxembourg
15 March 2019	France	Nationwide, 221 locations	195000	In Paris, estimated between 29000 and 40000 students (by police & organizers respectively)
15 March 2019	Austria	Nationwide	30000	Estimated 10500 students in Vienna
15 March 2019	Switzerland	20 locations	65000	Estimated 65000 participants in Switzerland (Organizer's estimation)
15 March 2019	Italy	Nationwide, 235 locations	200000+	Estimated 100000 students in Milan, 50000 in Naples, 30000 in Rome, 20000 in Turin, 15000 in Venice, 10000 in Florence and Genoa, 3000 in Bergamo, Bolzano, Bologna and Lecce, hundreds in other cities
15 March 2019	Malta	Valletta	Hundreds	
15 March 2019	United Kingdom	Nationwide, 120 locations	50000+	Estimated 20000 in London, 4000 in Brighton, 3000 in Edinburgh, 2000 in Glasgow's second climate strike, 1500 in Leeds, 500-1000 in Birmingham, 500 in Liverpool, hundreds in Cardiff
15 March 2019	Ireland	Nationwide, 37 locations	16000	Estimated 11000 in Dublin and 5000 in Cork.
15 March 2019	Portugal	Lisbon, Faro	Thousands	Thousands nationwide. Over 400 in Faro.
15 March 2019	Spain	Madrid and nationwide, 50+ cities	20000	Estimated 10000 in Madrid
15 March 2019	South Africa	Cape Town	2000	
15 March 2019	United States	Nationwide, 100+ locations	17000+	2500-3000 in Ann Arbor, MI, 2000 in New York City, 1500-2000 in Portland, OR, 1500 in Washington, D.C., 1000 in San Francisco, "about 1000" in St. Paul, MN, a "few hundred" in Los Angeles, "several hundred" in Chicago, "hundreds" in Seattle, "hundreds" in Boston, 200+ in Sacramento
15 March 2019	Canada	Nationwide, 70+ locations	150000+	Estimated 150000+ students in Montreal (by far the largest rally of 15 March), 2000 students in Vancouver, 1000 students in Ottawa, "hundreds" in Toronto, 350 in Kelowna, 300 in Edmonton & 150 in Calgary
15 March 2019	Mexico	Mexico City	800	
15 March 2019	Uruguay	Montevideo	Hundreds	at Palacio Legislativo
15 March 2019	Argentina	Buenos Aires	Hundreds	
15 March 2019	Colombia	Bogotá	2500	
15 March 2019	Chile	Santiago	2000+	
16 March 2019	France	Paris	350000	"Saturdays for Future" / "Marche du siècle"
21 March 2019	Belgium	Liège, Wavre, Saint-Georges-sur-Meuse, Brussels, and Antwerp	3400	1000 in Liège, 1000 in Wavre, 700 in Saint-Georges-sur-Meuse, 500 in Brussels, and 200 in Antwerp.
22 March 2019	Norway	Oslo, Trondheim, and over 50 others	40000	Including 15000 in outside the parliament in Oslo.
22 March 2019	France	Rennes	Hundreds	
24 March 2019	Belgium	Brussels	400	Organised by Greenpeace Belgium, Klimaatcoalitie and the Youth for Climate movement, which also organises the climate strikes in Belgium.
29 March 2019	Germany	Berlin and other cities	40000	About 25000 students in Berlin and 15000 more elsewhere in Germany.
4 April 2019	Belgium	Brussels	500-1200	500 strikers according to the police and 1200 strikers according to the organisers.
5 April 2019	Germany	Neubrandenburg, Greifswald, Schwerin	300+	250 strikers in Schwerin, 25 in Neubrandenburg and 30 in Greifswald.
5 April 2019	Serbia	Belgrade	Dozens	
5 April 2019	Canada	Toronto	100+	At least 100 Canadian strikers marched to Queen's Park in Toronto.
6 April 2019	Switzerland	Multiple locations	26000+	Over 15000 strikers in Zurich, 8000 in Lausanne, and 3000 in Geneva.
11 April 2019	Belgium	Brussels	1000	
12 April 2019	Germany	Berlin and other cities	1000+	About 1000 students in Augsburg and more elsewhere in Germany.
12 April 2019	United Kingdom	Nationwide	Thousands	"Thousands of thousands" students went on strikes across the United Kingdom. There were 400 strikers in Oxford and also hundreds in Liverpool.
12 April 2019	Northern Cyprus	Famagusta	600+	The second strike in Cyprus. The first one was held in March and was smaller than the strike on 12 April.
18 April 2019	Belgium	Ostend, Antwerp	350	200 in Ostend and 150 in Antwerp.
19 April 2019	Italy	Rome	25000	The strike in Rome was led by Greta Thunberg.
20 April 2019	Switzerland	Bern	1500	An estimated 1500 strikers participated in a Critical Mass event on Saturday. The event was organised by the Swiss climate youth movement.
22 April 2019	Canada	Quebec City	Hundreds	
25 April 2019	Belgium	Namur, Antwerp	500	400 strikers in Namur and 100 in Antwerp. A demonstration in Tournai was canceled.
26 April 2019	Slovakia	Bratislava	Hundreds	Hundreds of high school students and university students demonstrated in Bratislava.
27 April 2019	Canada	Montreal, Alma, Gaspé, Sherbrooke, Rouyn-Noranda, Mont-Laurier	Thousands	Canadian students across the province of Quebec held several marches in different locations. There were up to 10000 strikers, according to the organisers.
2 May 2019	Belgium	Brussels	530	About 530 strikers held a march in Brussels and walked from Brussels-North to Brussels Central Station.
3 May 2019	Canada	Nationwide, 85 cities	Thousands	Hundreds of students took part in strikes in both Victoria and Vancouver to protest climate change. About 100 students in Truro and 30 students in Corner Brook did the same. 200 strikers showed up in Sunshine Coast. Over 100 strikers in Peterborough demanded the city to declare a state of emergency on climate change. 250 students struck in Regina. 300 attended in Greater Sudbury.
3 May 2019	United States	Nationwide	Thousands	Students from hundreds of schools across the United States held several rallies and marches in different locations, including Boston, Chicago, Houston, New York City, Philadelphia, Phoenix, and Seattle.
4 May 2019	Switzerland	Seeland	300	300 strikers attended at what is believed to be the first climate strike on the Swiss countryside.
9 May 2019	Pakistan	6 cities	300	This was the eighth protest in Pakistan.
9 May 2019	Belgium	Antwerp, Mons	1200	About 200 strikers in Antwerp and 1000 in Mons.
11 May 2019	Switzerland	Kreuzlingen	500+	Between 500 and 600 student strikers gathered in the Swiss city of Kreuzlingen and marched to the German city of Konstanz.
11 May 2019	Germany	Konstanz	500+	Between 500 and 600 student strikers gathered in the Swiss city of Kreuzlingen and marched to the German city of Konstanz.
17 May 2019	Belgium	Brussels	650	650 strikers marched along with Raoni Metuktire through Brussels.
17 May 2019	Greece	Athens	1300	
24 May 2019	Australia	Sydney, Melbourne	1000+	According to Extinction Rebellion Australia, over 1000 students staged a die-in in Melbourne, There were also climate strikes in Sydney.
24 May 2019	Finland	Nationwide	150+	Between 100 and 150 students struck in Tampere. More strikes were held elsewhere, including in Helsinki, Seinäjoki and Kuopio.
24 May 2019	Sweden	Stockholm	6000	An estimated 6000 went on strike in Stockholm, including over 4000 students. The strikers marched from Humlegården to Kungsträdgården. Appearance by Greta Thunberg.
24 May 2019	Austria	Nationwide	5500	At least 5500 students in Austria went on strike, including 1000 in Graz, 700 in Bregenz, 2000 in Linz,300 in Klagenfurt and 1500 in Vienna.
24 May 2019	Germany	Nationwide	320000	
24 May 2019	Netherlands	Utrecht	1500	An estimated 1500 students struck in Utrecht. A group of over 200 teachers called Teachers for Climate supported them in an open letter.
24 May 2019	Belgium	Brussels	7500	7500 students struck and marched in Brussels during the twentieth and supposedly the last Belgian climate strike.
24 May 2019	France	Paris	21400+	According to an "independent counting" organisation, at least 14800 student strikers marched in the streets of Paris, mostly students. The organisers estimated the number of protesters in Paris to be 27000. There were also 3000 strikers in Lyon and Montpellier, 2600 in Nantes and 1000 in Tours.
24 May 2019	Greece	Nationwide	2000+	Strikers marched in Athens along with the candidate MEP Petros Kokkalis. A march took place in Thessaloniki.
24 May 2019	New Zealand	Auckland, Wellington, Christchurch and other locations	Tens of thousands	New Zealand's second school strike for climate
24 May 2019	Spain	Nationwide, about 50 cities	1000+	500 in Madrid, hundreds in Barcelona and hundreds elsewhere in Spain.
24 May 2019	Portugal	Lisbon	12000	Over 12000 students went on strike in Lisbon, according to the organisers.
24 May 2019	United Kingdom	Nationwide	Hundreds	Protesters gathered outside the Parliament of the United Kingdom in London. Similar demonstrations happened elsewhere in the United Kingdom.
24 May 2019	United States	Charlottesville	100	About 100 students from Charlottesville and Albemarle County schools gathered at the Freedom of Speech Wall, where several of them spoke, followed by candidates for the Charlottesville City Council. The crowd then walked along the Downtown Mall and back, cheered by onlookers.
24 May 2019	Serbia	Belgrade	50	Second strike for climate in Belgrade organised by Petkom za budućnost (Fridays for Future in Serbian) and supported by Educational system Kreativno pero. About 50 strikers attended.
31 May 2019	Austria	Vienna	10000	Appearance by Greta Thunberg.
21 June 2019	Germany	Aachen	40000	According to the organizers the largest single FFF climate strike in a German city that far
28 June 2019	Germany	Berlin	500	Parliament of Germany blocked by protesters
28 June 2019	France	Paris		Police and protesters clashed
5 July 2019	Germany	Cologne	500	
19 July 2019	Germany	Invalid's Park, Berlin		Appearance by Greta Thunberg
9 August 2019	Switzerland	Lausanne	2500	Demonstration ending the "SMILE for Future" conference ("Summer Meeting in Lausanne Europe") which gathered 450 young European activists, including Greta Thunberg, from 5 to 9 August 2019 and resulted in the "Lausanne Climate Declaration".
16 August 2019	North Atlantic Ocean	Malizia II	1	Greta Thunberg holding her sign on board during Transatlantic journey
23 August 2019	North Atlantic Ocean	Malizia II	1	Greta Thunberg holding her sign on board during Transatlantic journey
30 August 2019	United States	New York	Hundreds	In presence of Greta Thunberg, outside the Headquarters of the United Nations led by Xiye Bastida and Alexandria Villasenor.
6 September 2019	United States	New York	Hundreds	In presence of Greta Thunberg, outside the Headquarters of the United Nations led by Xiye Bastida and Alexandria Villasenor.
13 September 2019	United States	Washington, D.C.	Thousands	In presence of Greta Thunberg, White House climate strike led by Jerome Foster II is held.
20 September 2019	185 countries	5,800+ locations	4+ million	First day of the third global strike. Appearance by Greta Thunberg in New York City, while appearing on widescreen in Stockholm. See September 2019 climate strikes for a list of actions by country.
27 September 2019	170 countries	6,400+ locations	2+ million	Last day of the third global strike. Appearance by Greta Thunberg in Montreal, where 300,000–500,000 people gathered. Figures of 1 million protesters in Italy and 170,000 in New Zealand. See September 2019 climate strikes for a list of actions by country.
4 October 2019	USA	Iowa City, Iowa	Hundreds	Demonstrations and protests among students against coal power. Appearance by Greta Thunberg
11 October 2019	Netherlands	Leeuwarden	100	Students and pupils protested in front of the "Provinsjehûs" (province house) on Friday.
11 October 2019	USA	Denver, Colorado	Thousands	Appearance by Greta Thunberg in the Denver Civic Center.
18 October 2019	Canada	Edmonton, Alberta	Thousands	Appearance by Greta Thunberg
25 October 2019	Canada	Vancouver, British Columbia	15 000	Appearances by Greta Thunberg, David Suzuki and Severn Cullis-Suzuki
1 November 2019	USA	Los Angeles, California	1000	Appearances by Greta Thunberg
6 December 2019	Spain	Madrid	500.000	Appearances by Greta Thunberg at the United Nations COP25 Conference in Madrid, Spain
6 December 2019	USA, and 50+ other countries	300+ locations	1+ million	Protests parallel to the main protest in Madrid
17 January 2020	Switzerland	Lausanne	10000	First anniversary of the climate strikes in Lausanne, in presence of Greta Thunberg; same week as the judgement of the "Lausanne action climat" trial
24 January 2020	Switzerland	Davos	Dozens	With Greta Thunberg, invited at the World Economic Forum (for the second consecutive year)
7 February 2020	Netherlands	The Hague	500–1000	Strike organised by youth for climate exactly one year after the first strike on the same location
7 February 2020	Belgium	Brussels	1000	Despite objections by Deputy Minister-President Ben Weyts, a thousand young Belgians went to the streets for the first Belgian climate strike in 2020.
28 February 2020	United Kingdom	Bristol	30000	With Greta Thunberg. Organised by Bristol Youth Strike 4 Climate.
6 March 2020	Belgium	Brussels	Thousands	Thousands march in Brussels for the European Climate Strike as the warmest winter on record comes to a close.
4 September 2020	Switzerland	18 cities	10000	First climate strike after the beginning of the COVID-19 pandemic
25 September 2020	150+ countries	3,500+ locations	Thousands or more	Strikes were scheduled in thousands of locations around the globe, partly digital.
19 March 2021	50+ countries	800+ locations	Thousands or more	Seventh global climate strike, partly online under the banned #NoMoreEmptyPromises, but also in the form of demonstrations such as in Belgium or Switzerland.
21 May 2021	Switzerland	Nationwide	30000	"Strike for the Future", organised by organisations, students and unions to denounce the climate change policy pursued by the Swiss government.
24 June 2021	Netherlands	The Hague	Hundreds	On a Thursday, to celebrate the sixth anniversary of the State of the Netherlands v. Urgenda Foundation court case.
24 September 2021		Multiple locations		Global Climate Strike
25 March 2022		Multiple locations		Global Climate Strike
23 September 2022	Worldwide	450 locations	Tens of thousands	
13 January 2023	Germany	Lützerath	15 000 - 35 000	Protests against the eviction of Lützerath
3 March 2023	New Zealand	Auckland, Wellington, Christchurch, Dunedin, Nelson, Napier, New Plymouth, Palmerston North	Thousands	Protesting in the aftermath of the 2023 Auckland Anniversary Weekend floods and Cyclone Gabrielle.
5 April 2024	New Zealand	20 centres including Auckland, Wellington, Whangārei and Invercargill	Thousands	Protests calling for the retention of the ban on oil and gas exploration, upholding the Treaty of Waitangi, opposing fast track consenting legislation, protecting New Zealand's oceans and conservation land, climate education for all and lowering the voting age to 16 years. The protest was organised by Toitū Te Tiriti, Palestine Solidarity Network Aotearoa and School Strike for Climate.
14 February 2025	Germany	Berlin	10000	Rally and march.

== See also ==
- September 2019 climate strikes
