= Paul Neumann =

Paul Neumann may refer to:

- Paul Neumann (Attorney General) (1839–1901), Attorney General of the Kingdom of Hawaiʻi
- Paul Neumann (basketball) (born 1938), American professional basketball player
- Paul Neumann (swimmer) (1875–1932), Austrian swimmer

== See also ==
- Paul Newman (disambiguation)
