= Louise Mabulo =

Filipino environmentalist

Louise Emmanuelle Mabulo
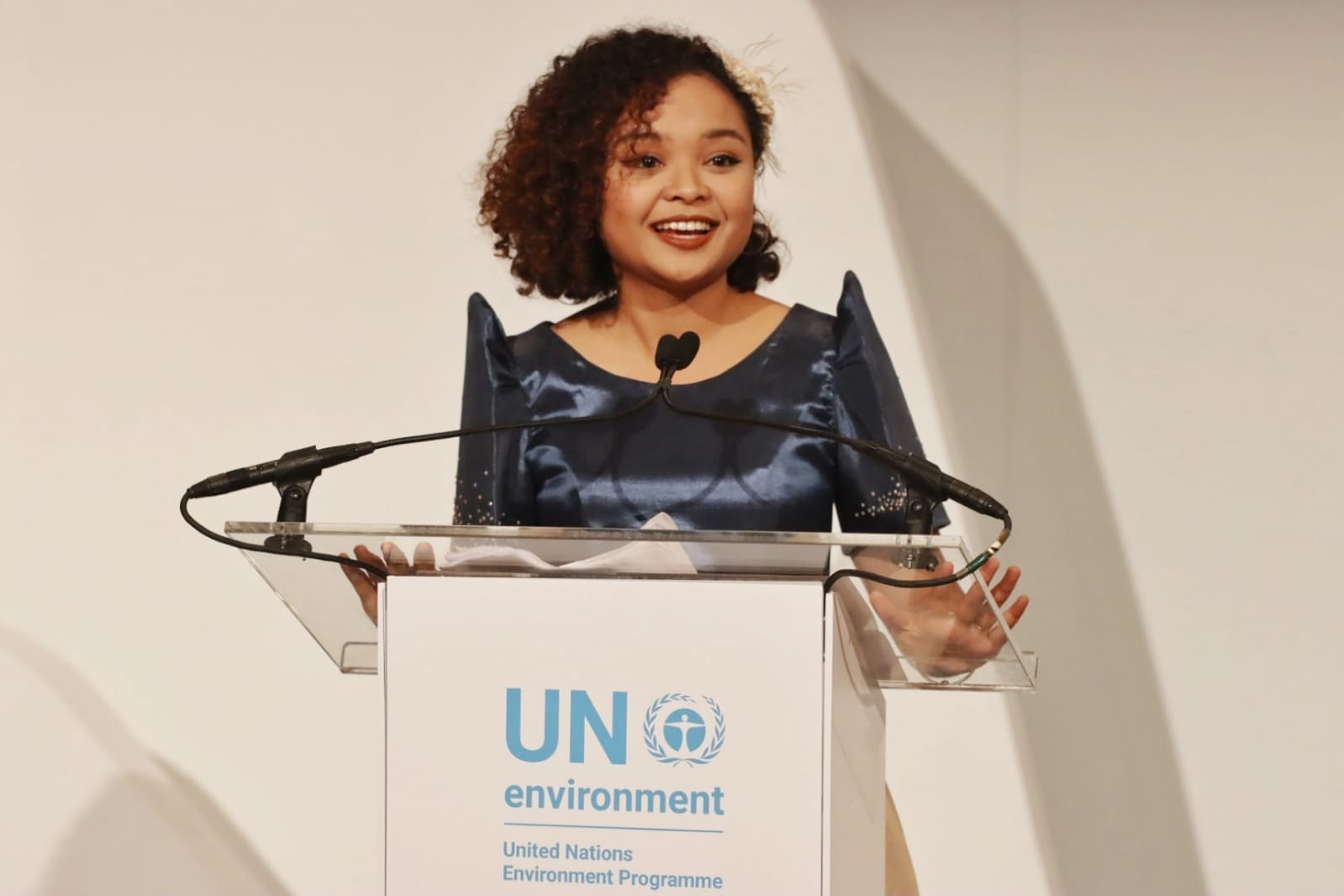
- Born: 12 September 1998 (age 27); Manila, Philippines
- Occupations: Chef, entrepreneur, farmer, environmentalist
- Title: Founder of The Cacao Project and Culinary Lounge
- Awards: United Nations Young Champion of the Earth National Geographic Young Explorer UN Foundation SDG Vanguard Awardee BBC's 100 Most Inspiring and Influential Women of the Year 2023 Forbes 30 Under 30 The World's 50 Best Restaurants Next Game-changing Producer Young Activists Summit Laureate Forbes Under 30 Honoree
- Website: https://louisemabulo.com/

Louise Emmanuelle de Guzman Mabulo (born September 12, 1998) is a Filipino environmentalist, social entrepreneur, and chef. She is the founder of The Cacao Project, an agroforestry and social business that works with over 200 farmers from the San Fernando area in the Philippines.

Mabulo is the TV Presenter of "Tech to Save the World", a documentary series on Channel News Asia that explores AI-powered technological innovations to find solutions around Climate change.

She is a National Geographic Explorer, and presented a National Geographic mini-documentary, Nat Geo Presents: Food Costs: Diet vs. Planet, exploring sustainable diets.

== Biography ==
Mabulo was born in Manila, raised in Swansea, and later moved to Camarines Sur, where she lives.

When Typhoon Nock-ten struck the Philippines in 2016, destroying almost all of the food supply, she organized a social media campaign to raise funds, but identified the need for seeds to re-build the agricultural lands. The trees that remained standing were cacao trees which she knew produced a high-value crop.

This led her to start the Cacao project which helps to mitigate climate change through providing resilient and resistant crops providing farmers with a sustainable, diversified income. The project has trained 200 farmers in agroforestry techniques, planted over 150,000 trees across 150 hectares of land, restored two water sources and uses environmental friendly techniques for pest control and crop fertilization. The project also provides farmers with seeds for staple crops such as bok choy, pumpkin and okra.

Part of her advocacy efforts are directed towards changing the perceptions that people have of farmers and agriculture, particularly removing the stigma that farmers are poor, uneducated and have failed in traditional educational systems. Through her work and advocacy, she builds an environment of respect and empowerment for farmers, since she believes agriculture is fundamental to address climate change:

In the end, our environment and our climate run through the very fiber of our daily lives: in our breakfast, lunch and dinner. And we need to close that gap that separates our consumers from our producers.

— Louise Mabulo, #Youth4ClimateLive Series: Driving Empowerment - Protecting the Most Vulnerable

Mabulo also founded The Culinary Lounge, a project that helps farmers by using local ingredients. She has been invited to speak at international events, including TED Talks.

== Awards and recognitions ==
Mabulo has taken part in culinary competitions since the age of 12, when she was a finalist at the Junior MasterChef Pinoy Edition. She won the Best Dessert in Asia Award at the Disciples des Escoffier Young Talent Trophy at the Restaurant and Bar Show in Hong Kong. Louise is recognised by 50 Next under The World's 50 Best Restaurants Awarding Body as a Game-changing Producer.

In 2018 she was named Outstanding Young Farmer of the Philippines. In 2019, United Nations Environment Programme named Louise a Young Champions of the Earth. She was named part of the Forbes' list '30 under 30 Asia', as a featured honoree.

In 2023, Mabulo was named to the BBC's 100 Most Inspiring and Influential Women of the Year 2023 in their annual 100 Women list.

In 2024, United Nations Foundation awarded Louise with the SDG Vanguard Award, which recognizes leaders whose work and impact reflects the urgency of the SDG agenda and the imperative to leave no one behind. She was awarded alongside Jacinda Ardern, Angélique Kidjo, Amanda Gorman, Time (magazine), and UNOPS at the We The People's event in New York.
