= Charlene Ren =

Chinese environmental engineer

Charlene Ren, also known as Xiaoyuan Ren, is a Chinese environmental engineer and social entrepreneur. She is the founder of MyH2O, an information platform that uses data to monitor water quality and improve access to clean water resources for rural communities in China.

== Early life and education ==
Ren was born and raised in Beijing. Her parents were both the first in their families to attend college.

As a high school student, she became interested in environmental issues and joined a local chapter of Roots and Shoots, the international youth organization founded by Jane Goodall. Her grandparents live outside the capital, and their experiences with unreliable water quality were an influence on her future field of study.

Ren received a Bachelor of Arts degree in physics from Vassar College and two master's degrees in Environmental Engineering and Technology Policy from Massachusetts Institute of Technology. As part of her graduate work, Ren studied rural water monitoring systems in India. This exploration developed into the ongoing MIT/India "Data for Improved Governance" project.

== Career ==
Ren first wrote a business plan for the company that would become MyH2O in 2014 during her postgraduate studies at MIT, with mentorship from engineer John H. Lienard V. She was inspired by the robust network of water quality and sanitation databases that she observed in India while completing her master's degrees. She launched the platform in 2015 with the goal of using similar data collection systems to combat a crisis of poor water quality in rural China.

There are tens of millions of people in China who do not have access to reliably clean drinking water; pollution caused by industrial and agricultural runoff is a significant problem in rural areas. Ren founded MyH2O on the crucial understanding that if environmental pollution is to be remediated, it must first be made visible.

The MyH2O platform collects data on rural water quality and sanitation through a network of youth volunteers. The data collected is shared with policy makers and then used for the provision of clean water resources to rural communities. Data is made available to volunteers and residents via a dedicated mobile app, which also provides resources and guidance about purifying contaminated water. The MyH2O network covers 1,000 villages located across 26 provinces.

Ren emphasizes that beyond the utility of the hard data collected, MyH2O also has the positive effect of empowering residents of rural villages to raise their voices and take action to improve their own circumstances, connecting them in a grassroots network of citizen-scientists.

== Advocacy ==
Ren is a member of the China Youth Climate Action Network. She has worked as an organizer of the International Youth Summit on Energy and Climate Change. Ren represented China during one of Homeward Bound's leadership events for women scientists, joining the group for a journey to Antarctica. She was named an Echoing Green Fellow in 2016.

== Awards and honors ==
In 2019 she appeared in Forbes's "30 Under 30" list in the category of Social Entrepreneurship and on the BBC 100 Women list of inspiring and influential women from around the world. She was honored as one of the United Nations Environment Programme's 2020 Young Champions of the Earth, an award which comes with project funding and mentorship.

== Personal life ==
Ren describes herself as a "proud vegetarian" and a supporter of feminist causes.
