= Anna Luísa Beserra =

Brazilian environmental entrepreneur (born 1997)

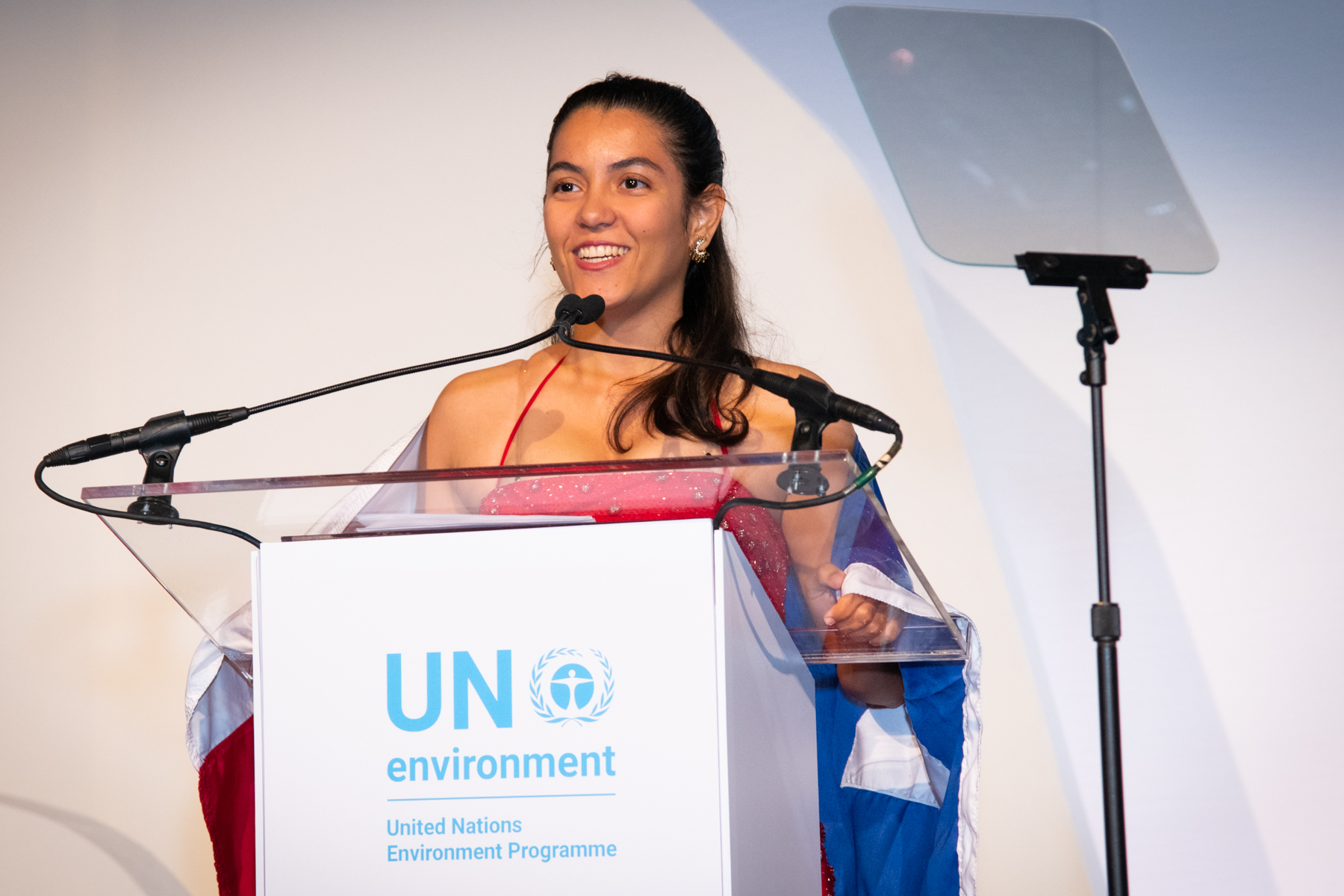
- Born: 24 September 1997 (age 29); Brazil
- Education: Federal University of Bahia
- Occupation: Entrepreneur
- Title: Founder and CEO of Safe Drinking Water of All
- Awards: United Nations Young Champion of the Earth, Prêmio Hugo Werneck de Sustentabilidade & Amor à Natureza, Shell LiveWIRE
- Website: https://annaluisabeserra.com/

Anna Luísa Beserra Santos (Salvador, September 24, 1997) is a Brazilian environmental entrepreneur. She is the founder and CEO of Sustainable Development & Water for All (SDW for all), a filtering system to disinfect rainwater collected in cisterns. She received the award "Young Champions of the Earth" from the United Nations Environment Programme in 2019, being until now the only Brazilian to receive the prize. Shell Company awarded her a prize in their LiveWIRE programme, in the category "Local prosperity" for her work on SDW. Anna Luísa is also a Fellow at the international organization Young Water Solutions.

== Early life and education ==
When she was 15 years old, Anna Luísa developed a product known as Aqualuz, a solar water disinfection filtering system. Her mentor encouraged her to launch a social entrepreneurship around the product. Her business is trying to bring water to some of the most dry areas of Brazil. SDW works with ESG projects focused on sanitation for rural areas, where companies invest in surrounding communities, and it was considered one of the 50 startups that will change Brazil.

She studied Biotechnology at the Federal University of Bahia.'

In 2019, she was awarded the Young Champions of the Earth from the United Environment Programme and the award Hugo Werneck de Sustentabilidade & Amor á Natureza. She was also listed as a 2020 Top 10 Innovator on Shell LiveWIRE.

In 2022, Beserra was selected as a Bloomberg New Economy Catalyst. As part of the program, she attended the annual New Economy Forum held in Singapore and the Bloomberg New Economy Catalyst Retreat that same year.
