= Balgis Osman-Elasha =

Sudanese climate scientist awarded Champion of the Earth in 2008

- Occupation: Climate scientist
- Employer: African Development Bank
- Known for: IPCC Fourth Assessment Report

Balgis Osman-Elasha is a Sudanese climate scientist who studies the effects of climate change in Africa and promotes sustainable development and climate change adaptations. She was a lead writer on the IPCC Fourth Assessment Report that garnered the Intergovernmental Panel on Climate Change a Nobel Peace Prize, and she was named a 2008 United Nations Environment Programme Champion of the Earth.

== Career ==
Osman-Elasha has been a climatologist and climate change expert at the African Development Bank since 2009. She has described the severe effects of climate change in Africa, particularly in the Horn of Africa region; promoted climate change adaptations; and pointed out the disparate contributions to climate change by industrialized countries. She notes that marginalized people, and women, particularly, are disproportionately affected by the negative effects of climate change, due to their dependence on threatened natural resources and because poverty limits their ability to adapt.

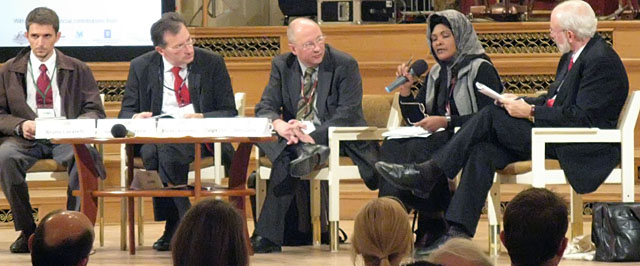
Balgis Osman-Elasha (second from right) participating in a panel on "adaptation of forests to climate change." Organized by IUFRO, CIFOR, ICRAF and PROFOR-World Bank; January 2011.

Osman-Elasha began her career doing forestry work at Sudan's Forests National Corporation in the 1980s. Her Fuelwood Development for Energy project emphasized community forestry, fuel conservation, and sustainable forest management. As part of that project, her team distributed improved cookstoves to reduce firewood use. She credits this work with having introduced her to the climate variability experienced in rural areas of Sudan, and to the problems faced by the rural communities.

Osman-Elasha began her climate change work as a researcher in the Climate Change Unit at Sudan's Higher Council for Environment and Natural Resources. Her work there included conducting greenhouse gas analyses, which caused her to realize the link between rising greenhouse gases and deforestation in Sudan. Her research there addressed climate change vulnerabilities and adaptations in drought-prone regions.

Osman-Elasha is a member of the Intergovernmental Panel on Climate Change and was a lead writer on the IPCC Fourth Assessment Report. She attended the Nobel Prize award ceremony as a representative of the IPCC when the organization was awarded the 2007 Nobel Peace Prize for that work.

Osman-Elasha was awarded the United Nations Environment Programme Champions of the Earth award in 2008. The award citation noted "Dr. Osman-Elasha's emphasis on global warming and adaptation in Sudan is vital given the strong interlinkages between climate change and conflict in the country" and also recognized her work educating university students about climate change.

== Personal life ==
Osman-Elasha is from Sudan. Her father worked for a bank and a restaurant in Khartoum. She has ten siblings.

She attended the University of Khartoum in the 1980s, when there were few female students. She holds a Bachelor of Science in agriculture and forestry, a Master's degree in environmental science, and a Doctorate in forestry science.

Osman-Elasha is married and has three children.

== Selected publications ==
- Osman-Elasha, Balgis (2012-04-17). "In the shadow of climate change". UN Chronicle. 46 (4): 54–55. https://doi.org/10.18356/5d941c92-en
- Elasha, B. O. (2010). Mapping of climate change threats and human development impacts in the Arab region. UNDP Arab Development Report–Research Paper Series, UNDP Regiona Bureau for the Arab States. https://arab-hdr.org/wp-content/uploads/2020/12/paper02-en.pdf
- Nyong, A., Adesina, F. & Osman Elasha, B. (2007). The value of indigenous knowledge in climate change mitigation and adaptation strategies in the African Sahel. Mitigation and Adaptation Strategies for Global Change 12, 787–797. https://doi.org/10.1007/s11027-007-9099-0
- Osman-Elasha, B., Goutbi, N., Spanger-Siegfried, E., Dougherty, B., Hanafi, A., Zakieldeen, S., ... & Elhassan, H. M. (2006). Adaptation strategies to increase human resilience against climate variability and change: Lessons from the arid regions of Sudan. Assessments of impacts and adaptations to climate change (AIACC) working paper, 42. http://www.start.org/Projects/AIACC_Project/working_papers/Working%20Papers/AIACC_WP42_Osman.pdf
- Elasha, B. O., Elhassan, N. G., Ahmed, H., & Zakieldin, S. (2005). Sustainable livelihood approach for assessing community resilience to climate change: case studies from Sudan. Assessments of impacts and adaptations to climate change (AIACC) working paper, 17.
