= Arshak Makichyan =

Russian climate activist

Arshak Arturovich Makichyan (Russian: Аршак Артурович Макичян [ɐrˈʂak ɐrˈturəvʲɪt͡ɕ mɐkʲɪˈt͡ɕʲæn], Armenian: Արշակ Արթուրի Մակիչյան [ɑrˈʃɑk ɑrˈturi mɑkiˈt͡ʃjɑn], born 2 June 1994) is a climate and anti-war activist from Armenia who was based in Russia until the Russian invasion of Ukraine.

== Early life and education ==
Arshak Makichyan was born in Armenia in 1994, but moved with his parents to Russia's capital, Moscow, in 1995. In the early 90s, Armenia was torn apart by the first Nagorno-Karabakh war, which resulted in many leaving the country.

He studied violin at the Moscow Tchaikovsky Conservatory.

== Climate Activism ==
Until he was arrested in December 2019 he staged a solo school strike for the climate every Friday in Pushkin Square, Moscow, for more than 40 weeks. In Russia, individual protests are lawful but anything larger requires police permission. Makichyan has applied to hold a bigger demonstration unsuccessfully more than 10 times.

He has inspired others across Russia to take part in school strike for the climate, including other single person pickets in Moscow. In December 2019 he was jailed for six days, hours after returning from Madrid, Spain, where he spoke at the 2019 United Nations Climate Change Conference (COP 25).

== Anti-War Activism and Exile ==
After Russia's 2022 invasion of Ukraine he expanded his protests, writing "I'm against the war" on dozens of his climate stickers, since he wasn't able to find a shop that would print the word "war." Makichyan was a social media manager, until his job "ceased to exist" after the Russian invasion of Ukraine led to websites being blocked in Russia.

After having to leave the country, he was put on trial while in exile in Germany, losing his Russian citizenship as a result. The Court accuses him of providing false information about himself when applying for his Russian citizenship in 2004, despite being just 10 years old at the time.

== See also ==
- Greta Thunberg
- Individual and political action on climate change
- List of school climate strikes
- Fridays For Future
- 2022 Russian invasion of Ukraine
