= Ant Forest =

Chinese tree planting initiative

Ant Forest (Chinese: 蚂蚁森林; pinyin: Mǎyǐ sēnlín) is a tree planting initiative launched in 2016 by Ant Financial Services Group, an Alibaba affiliate. It encourages users to lower carbon emissions by planting trees when users engage in activities that reduce carbon emissions.

As of the end of 2022, more than 650 million users have participated in a green, low-carbon lifestyle through the 'Ant Forest' initiative, collectively reducing carbon emissions and generating over 26 million tons of 'green energy'.

In 2023, the Hangzhou Asian Games Organising Committee, in collaboration with "Ant Forest," initiated the "Everyone Contributes 1 Kilogram to Support Carbon Neutrality in Asian Games" campaign. This initiative involved over 100 million participants and was recognised as the "Most Participated Environmental Event in a Year" by the Guinness World Records.

== Background ==
The world faces serious environmental challenges. As environmental pressures grow, global ecosystems are severely damaged. The Paris Agreement recognises the collective nature of the historic challenge of reducing carbon emissions. As an important economic force in the world, China also faces great challenges. In the process of transitioning to a more low-carbon lifestyle, the use of digital technology in the financial sector plays a key role and some progress has been made, but green finance still has great potential for development. The development of new digital technologies and the innovation of forms attract more citizens to participate directly in green financing. In this case, in August 2016, Ant Financial launched the Ant Forest Program.

== Application ==
The purpose of ant forest activity is to convert simulated energy into real trees. Ant Forest collaborates with institutions such as the Beijing Environment Exchange and The Nature Conservancy to calculate the values of carbon emission reduction and carbon sequestration. Initially, Ant Forest covered nine scenarios upon its launch, which has since expanded to over 40. These include five major categories: green transportation, online payment (to reduce travel), recycling, reducing paper and plastic use, and energy conservation and efficiency. Convert "avoid carbon emissions" below the scheduled carbon emission standard into a user's virtual energy stored in a personal Ant Forest account, where virtual energy accumulates in a certain amount and can be exchanged online for different types of trees or protected areas, and then Ant Financial works with its ecological partners to plant a real tree in the desert. The forest has a climate-oriented digital feature, where Alibaba is able to turn low carbon actions into green energy points which supports tree planting and related environmental projects. Some analysts felt that this could result in carbon sink prices which means that if carbon credits are cheap, it will allow users to trade sinks inside the system. Ant users are encouraged to record their low carbon footprints which can then be accumulated to actually plant trees in the actual Ant forest. This shows that the main value lies more in environmental branding for Alibaba and behavior change and user engagement, rather than any direct revenue benefit.

Ant Forest implements ecological projects through corporate donations to charitable organisations, maintaining an emotional connection with users through continuously updated, visible, and easily understandable projects. The variety of trees planted has expanded from initially only the saxaul tree to more than ten species, including poplar, willow, and pine. Additionally, Ant Forest's initiatives are not limited to afforestation but have gradually extended to terrestrial and marine ecological restoration and public environmental education.

Users could see the trees they planted through a satellite map. According to Gong Zhang, a former NASA scientist and the founder of GAGO Inc., it should be hard to see the saplings because of the low resolution of the satellite, but millions of saplings have been planted so we could see the changes they brought to the world. Alipay hopes to cultivate and encourage users to stick to a low-carbon lifestyle through this way.

In May 2017, the app reached 200 million users.

As of August 2023, Ant Forest has collaborated with over 20 charitable organizations and has planted 475 million trees. It has participated in the construction of 31 natural reserves and continuously supported ecological projects in 22 provinces. Ant Forest's various ecological charity initiatives have generated over 3.7 million labor income opportunities through planting, maintenance, and patrolling activities. Ant Forest channels corporate funding into preservation and conversation work through structured partnerships with foundations, forestry agencies, and local implementing groups. Rather than relying only on user participation, the program helps to finance large-scale tree planting, protect and manage areas and engage in restoration projects in dry regions where long-term maintenance is imperative as much as tree plantation. The corporate model gives projects more stability and allows them to be tracked with monitoring systems like satellite imagery and third-party oversight. The green initiative also connects Alibaba's ecosystem to measurable outcomes, making the project feel more like ongoing long-term commitment to important environmental objectives rather than some short-lived community engagement plan.

== Development ==
On September 5, 2017, Ant Forest released a plan called "Planet Blue" at its "Bluer Sky" forum of the public benefit activities week. This plan would open product capabilities and technology platform to the whole society and urge everyone to participate in a green future. This project tries to transform itself into an incubator of social charity innovation. The CEO of Ant Financial Services Group Xiandong Jin said:" Public benefit activities are right around us. The power of mobile Internet technology is available to everyone and makes everyone's actions into possible. Technology is the greatest public welfare of this era". He also pointed out that mobile Internet allows individuals to translate their daily low-carbon behaviors into green energy, whilst the use of technologies such as remote sensing satellite and artificial intelligent technology could help commonweal organizations to manage forest ecology better and make public benefits more real and transparent. The new plan of Ant Forest would encourage more access to low-carbon scenarios and await the NPO, government agencies, international organizations and other partners to join into this public benefit innovation.

According to Wang Zu, the product manager of the Ant Financial Services Group, the plan was more than finding trees and preserves and union of brands, it was a vision of achieving the open of the whole industry chain, which could connect all the green scenes and resources with everyone's actions on the platform.

On April 22, 2023, the 'Ant Forest Ecological Green Development Foundation' was established. The scope of this foundation's operations includes funding ecological conservation and restoration projects, supporting ecological education and environmental policy research, assisting other environmental charity initiatives, and providing aid and relief through various philanthropic projects.

== Cooperation ==
On January 19, 2017, Ant Financial and the United Nations Environment Programme (UNEP) launched the world's first green digital financial alliance during the Davos World Economic Forum, with the aim of harnessing digital technology to promoting financing that addresses global environmental challenges. The collaboration marked the UNEP's first joint venture with a Chinese company since it was established 45 years ago. The Sustainable Digital Finance Alliance (The Green Digital Finance Alliance) is registered as not-for-profit in Geneva and focuses on knowledge and policy recommendations and harnessing a global network of actors to undertake rapid and higher risk experimentation and challenges to address the potential for digital finance and fintech-powered business innovations to reshape the financial system in ways that better align it with the needs of sustainable development.

The United Nations Development Program (UNDP) released a report on China's carbon market on February 17 and specifically analyzed Ant Forest, the world's largest platform for gathering data on individuals' efforts to reduce their carbon footprints. The UNDP's report said the Chinese platform has "a special significance in enhancing personal contribution to the global response to climate change".

== Reward ==
The app won the award for Ali Annual Outstanding Public Benefit Activity Project.

On September 19, 2019, the app won the UN Champions of the Earth award, the United Nations' top environmental honour in inspiration and action category.

== Social implications ==
Maosheng Duan (the director of the China Carbon Market Research Center Tsinghua University and the former chairman of the executive board of the Clean Development Mechanism (CDM)) said that Ant Forest have taken a pioneering step towards promoting ordinary people to reduce carbon emissions at consumer-sides. Ant Forest would make more contributions to the environment and public benefits in China and even the world. Also, it would become a typical duplicable project.

Zhenping Huang (the assistant to the president of the Institute For Philanthropy Tsinghua University) believed that in the era of technology, the public benefit activities could reshape personal habits as well as affect cooperation and interactions among social groups profoundly. Such crossover collision provides the most fertile soil to innovation of public benefits.

In 2024, BBC reported that some users had exploited loopholes to accumulate virtual points and questioned whether the programme's reported carbon-reduction figures reflected real user behavior. Apparently many users were gaming Alibaba's Alipay application which was used to rack up 'green points' with the help of work-arounds. Hacks include using devices to swing phones back and forth to mimic walking, using more than one phone to water 'trees', and collaborating with other users to combine activity to increase 'green points' that are used to plant real trees. Ant Forest officially acknowledged the cheating and said that they blocked 26,000 accounts that had violated terms but that in no way takes away from the overall impact of the project which was awarded the UN Champions of the Earth Award in 2019. Ant Forest did clarify that the 'green points' that users collect do not count towards Ant Forest's own carbon neutrality targets.

== Carbon trading ==
Man-induced global climate change has become a prominent political issue. Dangerous climate change caused by rising greenhouse gas concentrations has a serious impact on global ecosystems, and governments are seeking mitigation measures and solutions. Market-based carbon trading is emerging as the most popular government strategy. Carbon trading refers to the economic action of trading carbon dioxide emissions rights as a commodity and in accordance with market mechanisms in order to reduce global greenhouse gas emissions, and in the 1990s European governments began to limit corporate emissions by directly regulating and imposing carbon taxes. In 2005, the EU formed its own carbon trading system. Between 1997 and 2001, The Kyoto Protocol encourages governments to develop carbon trading plans. Carbon permits have rapidly grown into an important financial instrument on the market with billions of dollars a year.

Since 2005 China is the world's largest emitter of greenhouse gases and is regarded by many countries as the most promising market for emission reduction. The Kyoto Protocol limits countries' greenhouse gas emissions in the form of regulations. Ant Forest is the world's largest platform for personal carbon accounts, which record each person's low-carbon behavior in quantitative terms. According to Chenlong, Chief Strategy Officer of Ant Forests, if individual carbon reduction activities can form a nationally recognized methodology and incorporate China's voluntary emission reduction project (CCER), it will become a "carbon account" for individuals to participate in carbon trading in the future, participating in the future trading and investment in the carbon market. In addition, as of August 2019, Ant Forest users have reached 500 million, Ant Financial and the largest entrepreneurial environmental organization, SEE public welfare organization, the actual planting of more than 100 million trees in China's northwest region, a cumulative reduction of carbon emissions of 7.92 million tons, these reduced CO_{2} emissions will also be a huge asset in the carbon market. In the future, sustainable investment will be a means of generating long-term returns.

In early 2018, Ant Financial acquired a stake in the Tianjin Emissions Exchange. Soon after, Ant Financial officially invested in the Beijing Environment Exchange through a capital increase and share expansion. Both entities aim to jointly develop the green inclusive financial market, continuously broaden application scenarios, promote the realization of green and low-carbon quantification, and collaboratively develop carbon neutrality services for individuals and small and micro enterprises.

Chen Long, the Chief Strategy Officer of Ant Financial, disclosed that in its initial phase, Ant Forest acquired 'green energy' through purchasing personal carbon accounts via charitable foundations, converting this into tree-planting activities. In the future, it plans to conduct voluntary emission reduction (VER) project transactions, following the internationally established VER trading mechanism.

However, there are views suggesting that the current carbon market trading is still immature, and integrating Ant Forest's carbon accounts with external carbon markets may not be beneficial. In China, the current carbon price is considerably lower compared to developed countries. If Ant Group were to convert the energy generated by Ant Forest into carbon sink products and sell them in mainstream markets, the revenue credited to each individual's account might only amount to a few cents. With the prevailing carbon sink prices still not high, opening up the trading system to sell carbon sinks may not bring significant value to Alibaba.

When the number of participants in personal carbon accounts reaches a certain scale, it is not ruled out that these accounts may link to financial markets and trading platforms. However, at present, it's important not to overemphasise the yet non-existent financial attributes and investment expectations of these accounts. Doing so might encourage a speculative mindset, leading people to believe that engaging in emission reduction activities is solely for personal gain through trading. This would deviate from the original social value of 'encouraging public participation in low-carbon behaviours. In order to prevent this, Alibaba and Ant Group have vowed to keep Ant Forest's green energy points non-financial and non-tradable. They cannot be sold, converted into cash, or exchanged for any sort of reward. Their only route of redemption is some sort of environmental action where principally the money that goes toward tree planting and conservation is through Ant Forest's nonprofit and ecological partners.

== Related litigation cases ==
In 2021, an article published by a WeChat public account claimed that Ant Forest, a green initiative, utilized the carbon emission savings accumulated by its nationwide users and then sold these credits to heavy polluting companies, allegedly aiding in environmental pollution. The article garnered over 70,000 views, sparking skepticism and criticism among many readers about the "Ant Forest" project. Ant Group issued clarifications to refute the false information related to the incident and sent legal letters to a cultural company and a media company. However, these efforts were not very effective. Consequently, Ant Group filed a lawsuit against the two companies for defamation and damaging the reputation of the "Ant Forest" green initiative. This case became a landmark in 2021 for the protection of private enterprises and entrepreneurs' personal rights in China. It highlighted issues of online self-media chasing trends, fabricating false information, and infringing on the reputation of private enterprises, where legal liability for infringement should be assumed.
