= Paul Newman (accountant) =

American accountant

Paul Newman is an American accountant, currently the Clark W. Thompson Jr. Chair in Accounting at University of Texas at Austin.
