= Women in climate change =

Climate change activists

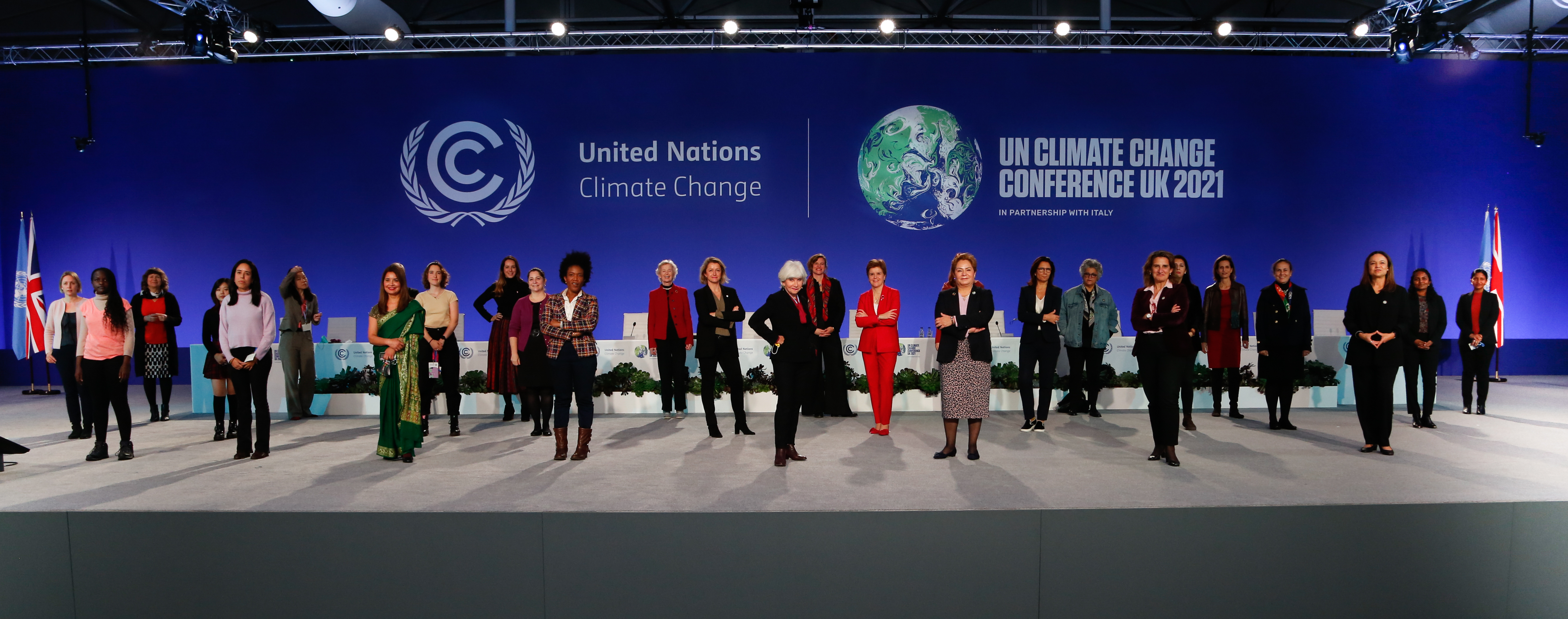
Women world leaders at the 2021 United Nations Climate Change Conference.

The contributions of women in climate change have received increasing attention in the early 21st century. Feedback from women and the issues faced by women have been described as "imperative" by the United Nations and "critical" by the Population Reference Bureau. A report by the World Health Organization concluded that incorporating gender-based analysis would "provide more effective climate change mitigation and adaptation."

Many studies have documented the gender gap in science and investigated why women are not included or represented, particularly at higher levels of research. Despite significant progress, female scientists continue to endure discrimination, unequal pay, and funding inequities, according to a special report published in the journal Nature in 2013. It also states that 70 percent of men and women around the world regard science as a male endeavor. Women encounter hurdles due to their family obligations, and they are underrepresented in publications and citations.

== Overview ==
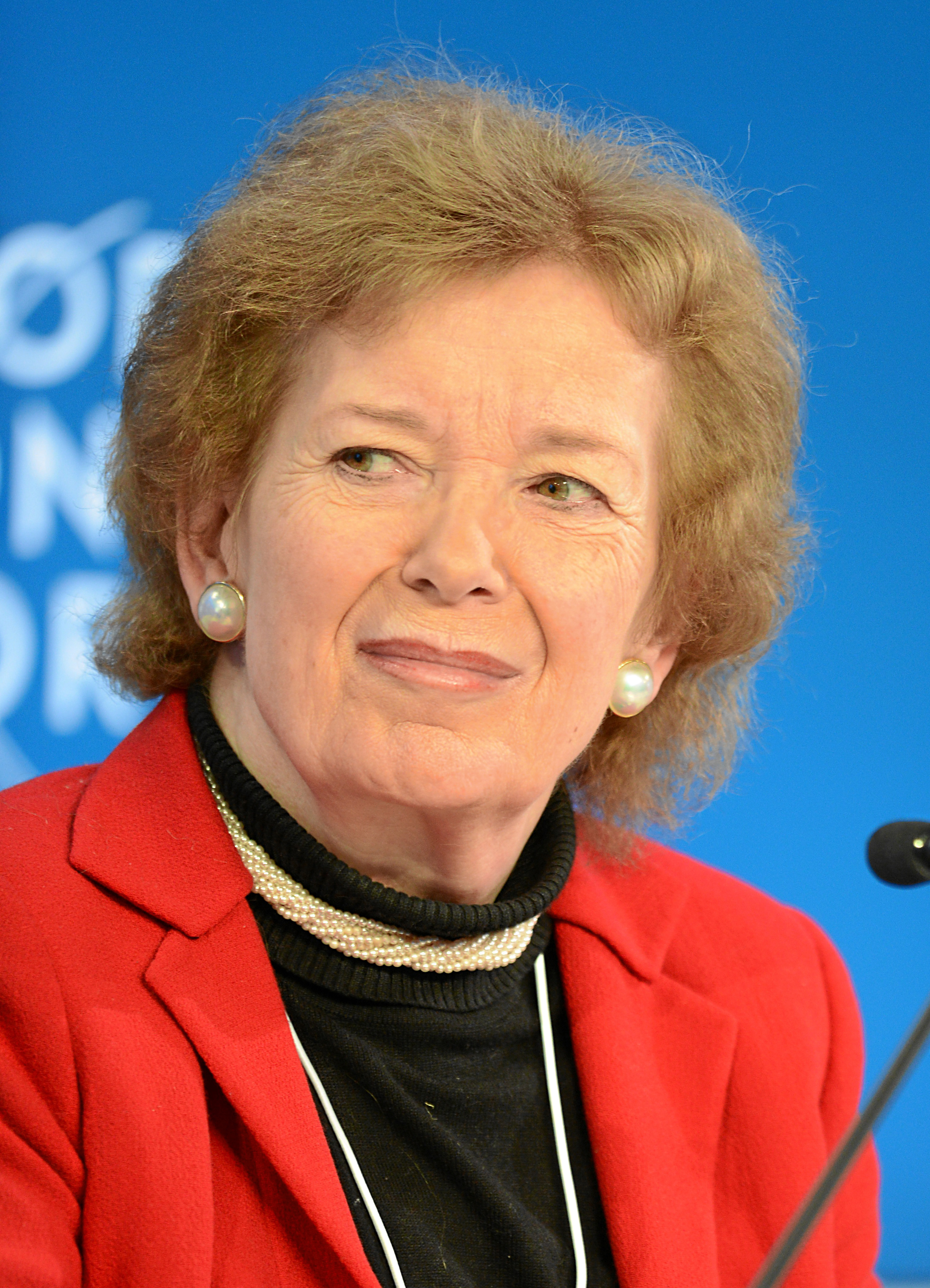
Mary Robinson

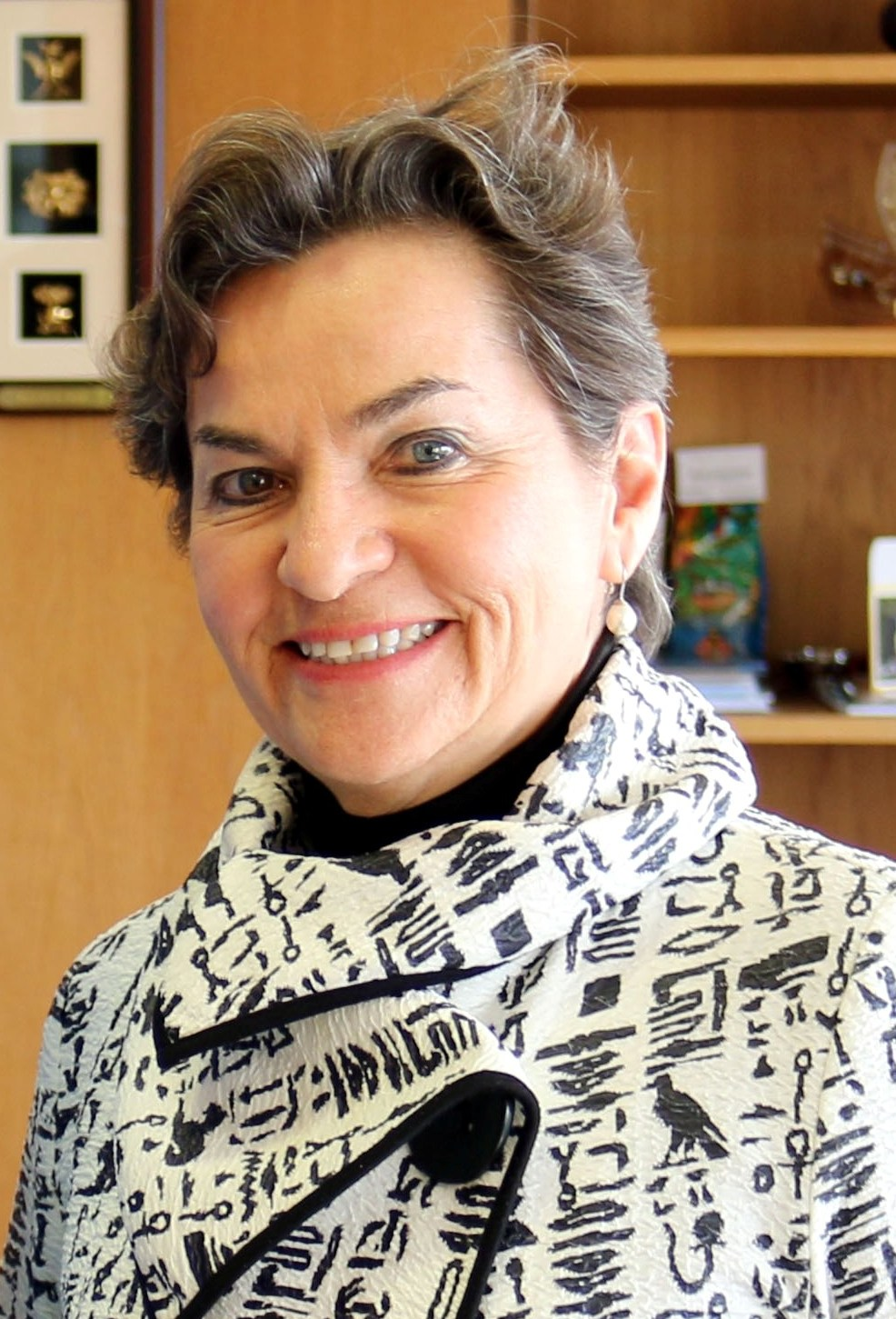
Christiana Figueres

Women have made major contributions to climate change research and policy and to broader analysis of global environmental issues. They include many women scientists as well as policy makers and activists. Women researchers have made significant contributions to major scientific assessments such as those of the Intergovernmental Panel on Climate Change and the Millennium Ecosystem Assessment and are reasonably well represented on key global change committees of the International Council for Science (ICSU) and US National Academy of Sciences. Women have played important leadership roles in international climate policy. For example, Christiana Figueres leads the international climate negotiations as the Executive Secretary of the UN Framework Convention on Climate Change (UNFCCC) and former Irish President Mary Robinson is the UN Special Envoy on Climate Change. Susan Solomon chaired the climate science working group 1 of the Intergovernmental Panel on Climate Change Fourth Assessment in 2007.

== Underrepresentation of women in science ==
Women are generally underrepresented in science and have faced many barriers to their success and recognition. Following the scientific revolution in the 17th century European women became involved in observational science, including astronomy, natural history and weather observations although many universities would not admit women until the late 19th century.

The latest report from the US National Science Foundation shows that while women are now earning half of the undergraduate degrees in science and engineering, most of these are in the biosciences (especially pre-med) compared to physics, computer sciences and engineering (20%). In terms of doctorates, women are also only 20% of the engineering and physics PhDs. Although the proportion of women full professors in the US has doubled since 1993 women occupy less than 1/4 of senior faculty positions in science and engineering and women earn less than men at the same level.

It has been noted that women of color, indigenous women and women from the global south are even more likely to be overlooked, to be poorly represented in the academy and leadership. This is associated with a legacy of discrimination, lack of educational opportunities, language barriers, and a lack of effort to identify and cite them.

== Women in climate change disciplines ==
Women are underrepresented in key disciplines for the study of climate change. For example, women are a minority in the earth sciences where surveys reveal that less than 20% of meteorologists and geoscientists are women. A recent analysis of US atmospheric science doctoral programs reveals that women were 17% of tenure track and tenured faculty, with even smaller proportions at higher rank, and 53% of departments had two or fewer women faculty. Women are slightly better represented in the ecological sciences. One study reports that women are 55% of graduate students in ecology but only 1/3 of tenured faculty are women and that 3/4 of the articles in the flagship international journal - Ecology - are written by men. Women received proportionally less research funding and were less likely to be cited by their colleagues. Women members of the Ecological Society of America increased from 23% in 1992 to 37% in 2010.

The United Nations Educational, Scientific and Cultural Organization publishes data on women in science worldwide. Overall women are better represented as a share of total scientific researchers in Latin America, Oceania and Europe (30%+) and least in Asia (19%).

== Arguments for women in science and climate change ==
It is argued that when women are overlooked as scholars and decision makers the world fails to take advantage of its full human capacity, which is needed for issues as urgent as climate change. Women may also take more collaborative approaches, especially in negotiations, and may pay more attention to disadvantaged groups and to the natural environment.

Gender has become an issue because of women's essential roles in managing resources such as water, forests and energy and as women lead fights for environmental protection.

A general concern has been expressed about the need to highlight the work of women and to include more women in major committees in order to provide gender balance, social justice, and inspiration to young women to enter careers in science. This reflects more general arguments about the barriers to women's advancement and the need for women to "Lean in" to leadership positions.

Another argument focuses on the effects climate change on reproductive health. It was not until recently that these issues were discovered and brought to light however, they are currently affecting many women all around the world and in turn will eventually have population effects. The pollutants and toxic chemicals that in air, food, and ecosystems are causing lots of health issues. Developing countries are currently suffering the most as they tend to be the waste dump sites from more developed countries as they are seen as more disposable. Not only can these pollutants cause infertility, they can create issues with formation of babies and the overall weight and health as well as cause miscarriages. Not only is our future generation suffering the consequences the mothers of these children are suffering health issues. This is another important reason why women should be brought into the climate change discussion.

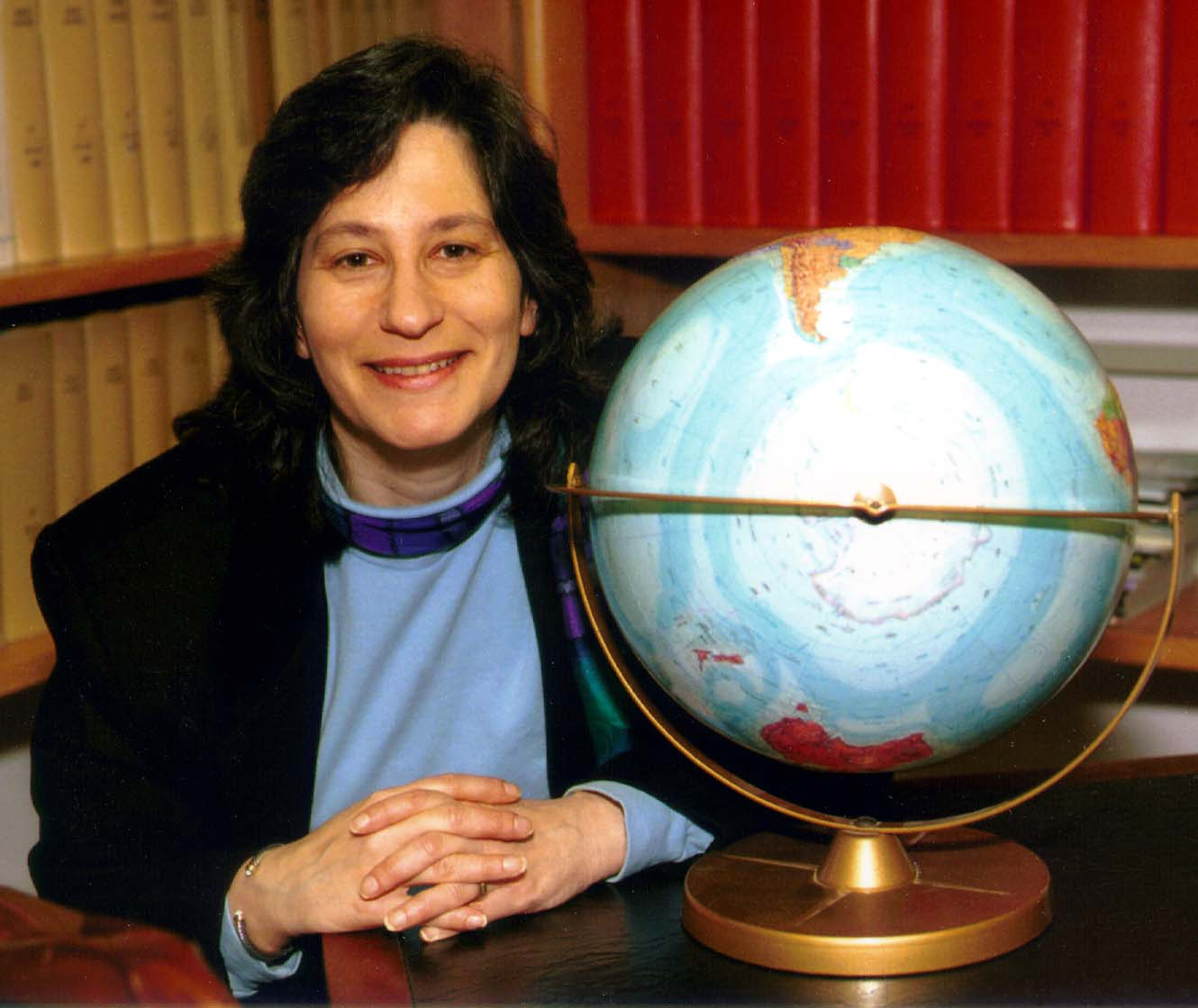
Susan Solomon

== Women and international climate policy ==
The outcome document of the Rio+20 Conference on Sustainable Development - the Future we Want - recognized the need to remove barriers to the full and equal participation of women in decision making and management and the need to increase women in leadership positions. A report prepared by UN Women, the Mary Robinson Foundation - Climate Justice, the Global Gender and Climate Alliance and the UNFCCC recognizes the structural inequalities that impede the representation of women in climate science, negotiations and policies and recommends greater gender balance in the UNFCCC and national delegations. The report argues that the "challenges of climate change cannot be solved without empowering women" and that women have been marginalized in international negotiations. It reports data that show weak representation of women in the institutions of the UNFCCC including the Adaptation Committee (25%), the GEF Council (19%) and the Expert Group (15%) and that overall women constitute less than 20% of delegation heads and less than 30% of delegation members at UNFCCC conferences.

== The Manthropocene ==
A call for international science to pay greater attention to the inclusion of women scholars was made by Kate Raworth and then in her article "Must the Anthropocene be the Manthropocene?" She pointed out that the working group of 36 scientists and scholars who convened in Berlin in 2014 to begin assessing evidence humanity was entering a new epoch, the Anthropocene, was composed almost entirely of men. She stated: "Leading scientists may have the intellect to recognize that our planetary era is dominated by human activity, but they still seem oblivious to the fact that their own intellectual deliberations are bizarrely dominated by white northern male voices".

== Women working in climate change ==
There are a variety of ways to identify women who have made major contributions to climate change. The first is the list of authors of the high level international assessments for the UN and other organizations such as the Intergovernmental Panel on Climate Change and the UN Framework Convention on Climate Change (UNFCCC). The second is to examine women who have been invited to join the editorial boards of climate change refereed journals. A third is to look at the membership of the global change committees of the International Council for Science (ICSU). And a fourth is to recognize women that are members of their National Academy of Sciences who work on climate change. Many of them are IPCC or other report authors, and also members of ICSU committees, members of their National Academy and other marks of accomplishment.

Seven cities around the world have appointed women as Chief Heat Officers (CHOs) to take action against extreme heat due to climate change.

In February 2024, the EIB Group established the Women Climate Leaders Network, bringing together 47 women leaders from the commercial sector from all 27 EU Member States, to collaborate on innovative business models and strategies to facilitate the low-carbon and green transition.

Women are statistically more likely to live in conditions of poverty in today's world. Women tend to work within the household cooking, cleaning, and taking care of children. Women have a lack of access to resources as well as environmental services in comparison to the rest of the population. Despite these setbacks, there has been a push for women to get more involved in climate change activism. Many Indigenous communities have put more of an emphasis on passing environmental knowledge down through generations. This provides knowledge of the past and how to effectively go forward with more sustainable practices. There is a push to understand how genders are differently affected by climate change and use the various perspectives that are not always seen to initiate change. Overall there is a general push to push for more genders to be involved in bigger climate issues to see how best to attack issues.

Women in climate change have taken on many roles to help the fight against climate change in the field today. For example, Hindou Oumarou Ibrahim is an Indigenous activist that is working in Chad. She is working to spread the word of the people actively fighting climate change today in Chad and educate people about their conditions. She is trying to spread the knowledge of indigenous people as their in-depth knowledge of the environment can help us adapt to the changes. She has won many awards for her work and has been working within the UN on indigenous issues as well as indigenous advocacy. Katharine Wilkinson is an educator around the country. She is working to educate people on climate change and the impacts that it is having on the Earth. She aims to create an encouraging positive environment for women to work within the climate movement. Katharine Wilkinson has worked on a book called the All We Can Save Project that brings together the voices of 60 women that are doing work within climate change on the ground today. She aims to bring in more voices of women in order to open up the climate change discussion to different perspectives as well as show the readers the ways that we can help to combat climate change together.

== Ecofeminism ==
Ecofeminism is a branch of feminism that sees environmentalism and the relationship between women and the earth as interlinked. According to Françoise d'Eaubonne in her book Le Féminisme ou la Mort (1974), ecofeminism relates the oppression and domination of all marginalized groups (women, people of color, children, the poor) to the oppression and domination of nature (animals, land, water, air, etc.).

Ecofeminism first came to be in the 1970s when there were major changes in policy in terms of sustainability and gender inequality. Ecofeminism work originates in peace movements, women’s health care, and women labor movements. Ecofeminists aim to show connection with nonhuman life. The Ecofeminists argue that patriarchy gives the view that men are ‘developed' and women and other underrepresented groups are ‘underdeveloped’ which normalizes the oppression of these ’underdeveloped’ groups. Ecofeminism aims to open up the woman view of the interconnected sense of self that women hold versus males that tend to be more disconnected. Adding women’s views within the work of climate change brings a different perspective that lacks within the current male dominated discussion of climate change.

== The Greta Thunberg effect ==
Greta Thunberg has been credited with inspiring young girl to take more action on climate change, which has become known as the "Greta Thunberg effect." Thunberg is well known for her work on fighting climate change. In Kazakhstan, a group of young girls named Team Coco have come together to fight the ecological problems that pollute their nation, in order to accomplish this they have created an app known as TECO which is an "augmented reality game that merges educational and entertainment tools to help players change their behavior and become more eco-conscious". More girls have been taking action against climate change by using technology, and in turn help encourage other political leaders to take action for climate change and business corporations to reduce the carbon foot print they leave behind.

== Women climate researchers ==
Following is a comprehensive list of women researchers in the climate change field. Note that not all women researchers have their individual Wikipedia pages that showcase their work (red text indicates no Wikipedia page). You can amplify their work by creating individual Wikipedia pages and updating them if they already exist.

- Ibidun Adelekan: Associate Professor in the Department of Geography at University of Ibadan, Nigeria. Her research focuses on climate-society interactions, human dimensions of global environmental change, vulnerability and resilience of human-environment systems to climate change. She is a lead author of the IPCC AR6 and a contributing author to the IPCC AR5 - Africa Chapter.
- Carolina Adler: Executive Director of Mountain Research Initiative (MRI), Switzerland where she oversees the work of the MRI coordination office, promotes global change research agenda and supports regional and thematic collaborations across mountain communities worldwide. She is an Environmental Scientist and Geographer by background and has vast experience in international career, both in public and private sector. She is a lead author of the IPCC Special Report on Ocean and Cryosphere and Working Group II of IPCC AR6.
- Paulina Aldunce: Associate Professor of the Department of Environmental Science and Natural Resources and the Deputy Director of the Center of Disaster Risk Reduction, CITRID at University of Chile, Chile. Her research interests include the social and institutional dimension of disaster management and climate change, with a focus on adaptation, resilience, transformation, and local and community management. She is a leading author of three IPCC reports including the latest IPCC Sixth Assessment Report.
- Elham Ali: Professor of Oceanography at the University of Suez, Egypt where she is the head of the Department of Aquatic Environment Sciences and Director of Suez University International Relations Office. Her expertise includes aquatic ecology, marine biodiversity, coastal ecology and water quality assessment and monitoring. She is the lead author of the IPCC AR6 and the coordinating lead author of the Mediterranean cross chapter.
- Paola A. Arias: Associate Professor at the Environmental School of University of Antioquia, Colombia. Her research interests include climate dynamics, climate change, climate variability and surface hydrology in Colombia and South America. She is a lead author for Working Group I of the IPCC AR6.
- Laura Astigarraga: Professor at the Department of Animal Production and Pastures at the University of Republic, Uruguay. Her research expertise includes climate change, dairy science, pasture management, agricultural economics and environmental science. She is an author of the IPCC AR6.
- Karin Bäckstrand: Professor of Political Science at Stockholm University, Sweden who has written extensively on climate and environmental governance and advises the ICSU Earth System Governance project.
- Sallie Baliunas: retired astrophysicist. She formerly worked at the Harvard-Smithsonian Center for Astrophysics and at one point was the deputy director of the Mount Wilson
- Rondrotiana Barimalala: Postdoctoral Researcher in the Department of Oceanography, University of Cape Town, South Africa. Her research interests include climate variability, modeling and change, air sea interaction and African climate. She is a lead author of the IPCC AR6: The Physical Basis. Her current projects are CRISTAL project (Climate ResilIent development for SoutheasTern African isLands) where she serves as a Principal Investigator and a study of "uncertainty reduction in climate models for understanding development applications" over central and southern Africa.
- Birgit Bednar-Friedl: Associate Professor at the Department of Economics, University of Graz, Austria. Her expertise includes environmental economics, natural resource management, climate change impacts, energy economics, and biodiversity and conservation. She is a coordinating lead author of the IPCC Sixth Assessment Report.
- Michele Betsill: Professor of Political Science at Colorado State University in the USA who is an expert on cities and climate change and transnational forms of climate governance. She is a member of the Scientific Steering Committee for the ICSU Earth System Governance project and was a contributing author to Working Group III of the IPCC Fifth Assessment Report.
- Suruchi Bhadwal: Director of Earth Science and Climate Change at TERI (The Energy and Resource Institute), India. She leads climate change research focusing mainly on impacts, vulnerability, and adaptation assessment and works closely with local communities. She was a lead author of the IPCC AR2, and a review editor for the IPCC AR5 WGII report and the IPCC Special Report on Extreme Events. She is also a lead author of the IPCC AR6 Working Group II report.
- Preety Bhandari: Director for Climate Change and Disaster Risk Management Division of the Sustainable Development and Climate Change Department (SDCC) at Asian Development Bank, Philippines. She also serves as the Chief of Climate Change and Disaster Risk Management thematic group. Her expertise include providing policy and strategic direction, accessing finance from Climate Investment Funds and Green Climate Fund, and supporting international negotiations on climate finance, in addition to the focus on environment, climate change and sustainable development. She is also a lead author of the upcoming IPCC AR6 report.
- Mercy Borbor-Cordova: Associate Professor at Escuela Superior Politécnica Del Litoral (ESPOL) in Ecuador. Her research focuses on ocean, human health, and interaction between climate and health. She is particularly interested in transferring knowledge to decision makers and practitioners especially in the field of climate services for coastal marine resources and human health. She is a lead author of the IPCC AR6 Working Group III which focuses on mitigation.
- Lidia Brito: Professor of Forestry at Eduardo Mondlane University in Mozambique who is the former Minister of Higher Education, Science and Technology of Mozambique and has worked closely with UNESCO on global change issues and chaired the Planet under Pressure conference in 2012.
- Harriet Bulkeley: Professor of Geography at the University of Durham in the UK who is an expert on cities and climate change, energy and environmental governance.
- Jane Burston: Managing Director of the Clean Air Fund. She was previously Head of Energy and the Environment at the National Physical Laboratory and Head of Science for climate change and energy in the United Kingdom central government.
- Mercedes Bustamente: Ecologist and Full Professor at University of Brasília, Brazil. She is widely known for her contributions to the ecological knowledge of threatened tropical ecosystems and their interactions with human-induced changes. Her research lab focuses on studying the natural ecosystem's responses to changes in disturbance regimes, land use, biogeochemical cycles and climate. She is a lead author of IPCC AR6 and is an international member of the US National Academy of Sciences.
- Inés Camilloni: Professor at the Department of Atmospheric and Ocean Sciences at the University of Buenos Aires, Argentina and an independent researcher at the Center for Research on the Sea and Atmosphere. Her research focuses on Climate Variability and Change in South America. She was a lead author for the IPCC AR5-WG1 and SR1.5 reports and is currently a review editor of IPCC AR6-WG1.
- Pasha Carruthers: Environmental Sustainability Adviser with a focus on sustainable development and global change issues. She was formerly a Cook Islands National Coordinator at RedCross Office in Cook Islands. She has wide experience in international negotiations, project proposal development, and participatory approaches through her work with the Government of the Cook Islands National Environment Service and Secretariat of the Pacific Community. She is a review editor of the IPCC AR6.
- Anny Cazenave: Deputy director of the French Laboratory for Geophysical Studies and Spatial Oceanography who is an expert on sea level rise and IPCC lead author.
- Ruth Cerezo-Mota: Researcher at the Laboratory of Engineering and Coastal Processes at National Autonomous University of Mexico, Mexico. Her research interests include climatology, climate change, regional climate models and extreme events. She is a lead author of the IPCC AR6 Working Group I: The Physical Science Basis. She completed her PhD from University of Oxford in Atmospheric, Oceanic and Planetary Physics.
- Noemí Chacón: Researcher at Instituto Venezolano de Investigaciones Científicas (IVIC), Venezuela. She is a lead author of the IPCC AR6 report.
- Elizabeth Chatterjee: She is an Environmental Historian expert. She works with a focus on energy histories, specifically in India. She wrote one book called Electric Democracy about the history of India's energy- centered transformation over time and is currently working on her second book about worldwide energy and environmental crises starting from the 1970s. She is currently teaching at the University of Chicago.
- Lynette Cheah: Associate Professor at Singapore University of Technology and Design, Singapore. She leads the Sustainable Urban Mobility research group to reduce environmental impacts of passengers and urban freight transport. Her expertise lies in transport modeling and simulation, life cycle energy and environmental assessment of products and systems, and urban metabolism. She is a review editor of the IPCC AR6.
- Ying Chen: Professor at Chinese Academy of Social Sciences (CASS) Graduate School and a Senior Research Fellow at Institute for Urban and Environmental Studies (IUE), CASS, China. She is also the Deputy Director of CASS Research Center for Sustainable Development. Her research interests include international climate governance, energy and climate policy. She is a lead author of the IPCC AR6.
- Wenying Chen: Professor in Energy, Environment and Economics Research Institute, Tsinghua University, China. Her research focuses on energy system modeling, energy development, and climate change mitigation strategy. She also researches CCS (Carbon Capture and Storage) to develop an Arc-GIS based Decision Support System to map carbon emission sources and sinks. She is well known for her work in the area of energy environment, economy modelling, carbon permit allocation and more. She is a review editor for both IPCC AR5 and AR6.
- So Min Cheong: Associate Professor in the Department of Geography and Atmospheric Sciences at the University of Kansas, USA. Her research focuses on the social consequences of environmental disasters and climate change adaptation. She is a lead author of the IPCC Sixth Assessment Report and the IPCC special report on ocean and cryosphere. She has also worked on a number of commissioned reports for the Korean government, UNESCO and WMO on the topic of coastal management, climate change adaptation and boundary issues and disaster management.
- Julia Cole: Professor of Earth & Environmental Sciences at the University of Michigan, USA. Expert on climate history, variability and corals. Leopold Leadership Fellow (2008), IPCC contributor and Google Science Communication Fellow (2011).
- Cecilia Conde: Professor of Atmospheric Science at UNAM, Mexico, who works on climate impacts on agriculture. She is the director of climate adaptation for the Mexican Institute of Ecology and Climate, contributor to IPCC.
- Leticia Cotrim Da Cunha: Assistant Professor at the Faculty of Oceanography at Rio de Janeiro State University in Brazil. As a chemical oceanographer, her research focuses on the Southwestern Atlantic region and co-leads the Brazilian Ocean Acidification Research Network. She is a lead author of the IPCC AR6 Working Group I.
- Faye Abigail Cruz: Laboratory Head of the Manila Observatory, Philippines. Her research is focused on regional climate and climate change, extreme weather events, and interactions between land surface and climate. She is also involved in the Coordinated Regional Climate Downscaling Experiment (CORDEX)-Southeast Asia project of the World Climate Research Programme (WCRP). She is a lead author of the IPCC AR6 Working Group I.
- Heidi Cullen: Director of Communications and Strategic Initiatives and director of the Information and Technology Dissemination (ITD) Division at MBARI, formally the chief scientist for Climate Central. Expert on climate change communication. Formerly climate change expert for weather channel. Science advisory board for NOAA
- Judith Curry: Professor at the School of Earth and Atmospheric Sciences, Georgia Institute of Technology. She has written or co-authored over 140 research papers, mainly in the field of atmospheric science. She also runs her own climate blog, and has testified before the US House of Representatives.
- Gretchen Daily: Professor of Environmental Science at Stanford University, director of the Center for Conservation Biology at Stanford, and senior fellow at Stanford Woods Institute for the Environment. Co-founder, Natural Capital Project. She is a fellow of the U.S. National Academy of Sciences, the American Academy of Arts and Sciences, and the American Philosophical Society. She is a board member of the Beijer Institute for Ecological Economics and The Nature Conservancy and was a MacArthur fellow.
- Purnamita Dasgupta: Chair Professor and Head of Environmental Economics Unit at Institute of Economic Growth, India. Her research focuses on the relationship between environment and economic development. She has been an author and advisor to the international research assessments including the IPCC 1.5C Special Report and International Panel on Social Progress; the IPCC's Scientific Steering Group on Economics, Costing and Ethics; Collaborative Adaptation Research Initiative in Africa and Asia (CARIAA) and the Association of Commonwealth Universities. She is a lead author of the IPCC AR6.
- Ruth DeFries: Professor of Sustainable Development Department of Ecology, Evolution, and Environmental Biology, Columbia University. She is a faculty affiliate of the Earth Institute, Columbia University. She is a member of the United States Academy of Sciences and was a MacArthur Fellow in 2007. Defries specializes in using remote sensing to study earth's habitability in the context of deforestation and other human drivers that influence biophysical and biogeochemical regulatory processes.
- Fatima Denton: Director of the United Nations University, Institute for Natural Resources in Africa (UNU-INRA), Ghana. Her expertise lies in natural resource management, research and policy development and the African region. Formerly, she worked with the United Nations Economic Commission for Africa (UNECA), Canada-based International Development Research Centre (IDRC) and United Nations Environment Programme. She is a lead author for the IPCC Special Report on Climate Change and Land, and a coordinating lead author for the IPCC AR6 Working Group III.
- Claudine Dereczynski: Professor at Institute of Geosciences, Federal University of Rio De Janeiro, Brazil. Her research expertise include numerical weather prediction, regional climate modeling, climate variability, atmospheric science and climate change. She is a lead author of the IPCC AR6 report.
- Sandra Diaz: Professor of Community and Ecosystems Ecology at Córdoba National University, and Senior Principal Researcher of the National Research Council of Argentina. She studies plant interactions with global change drivers and their effects on ecosystem properties. She was a Guggenheim Fellow in 2002 and is a Foreign Associate Member of the USA National Academy of Sciences. She participated in the Millennium Ecosystem Assessment and the IPCC. She is a member of the Science Committee of the international programme on biodiversity science DIVERSITAS, and the founder and director of the international initiative Núcleo DiverSus on Diversity and Sustainability.
- Aïda Diongue-Niang: Adviser of the National Agency for Civil Aviation and Meteorology, Senegal. She has more than 20 years of experience in interacting with a wide range of stakeholders at all levels and has expertise in numerical weather prediction, atmospheric physics, climate, monsoon and extreme events. She is a lead author of the IPCC Sixth Assessment report Working Group I.
- Riyanti Djalante: Assistant Director/Head of Disaster Management and Humanitarian Assistance Division at the ASEAN Secretariat, Indonesia. She is also a visiting lecturer at United Nations University - Institute for the Advanced Study of Sustainability. Her research focuses on sustainable development, governance, disaster risk reduction and climate change adaptation. Currently, she is a fellow of the Earth System Governance Network and is a lead author of IPCC AR6.
- Fatima Driouech: Associate Professor and the Executive Coordinator of the Adaptation Metrics and Techniques Cluster at the Mohammed VI Polytechnic University, Morocco. Her research interests include climate variability, regional climate modeling and climate science. Previously, she was the Head of the Meteorological Research Center of the Moroccan Meteorology and the National Climate Centre. She was also Vice-Chair of Working Group I of the IPCC and she was lead author of the fifth IPCC report. For the recent IPCC AR6, she serves as a review editor. She is currently acting as co-coordinator of MedECC, the independent network of Mediterranean Experts on Climate and environmental Change.
- Opha Pauline Dube: Professor of Environmental Science, University of Botswana. Dube has expertise in sustainable development, community-inclusive environmental management, and climate change adaptation. She is an IPCC contributing author.
- Carolina Dubeux: Social Scientist and a Senior Researcher at the Federal University of Rio de Janeiro, Brazil. Her research focuses on environmental analysis, climate change, sustainability, and ecological economics. Her work related to the mitigation of climate change and socio-economic development especially with Brazilian cities is recognized as pioneering. She was a lead author of the IPCC AR5 and is a review editor of the IPCC AR6.
- Kris Ebi: Professor of Global Health, University of Washington. Expert on climate change impacts on health, IPCC coordinating lead author.
- Tamsin Edwards: British climate scientist, lecturer at King's College London and a popular science communicator.
- Hannah Fluck is a Senior National Archaeologist at the National Trust, UK and the former Head of Environmental Strategy at Historic England. She is a member of the Climate Heritage Network (CHN) Steering committee and Europe and the Commonwealth of Independent States (CIS) Vice Chair at CHN.
- Eunice Newton Foote: Conducted early studies on warming of air containing carbon dioxide, presented in 1856 at a meeting of the American Association for the Advancement of Science.
- Sha Fu: Assistant Professor at the National Center for Climate Change Strategy and International Cooperation, National Development and Reform Commission, China. She has expertise in GHG emission inventory and trends, GHG policies, emission reduction strategies including the financial, technological and capacity building aspects. She is a lead author of the IPCC AR6.
- Inez Fung: Professor of Atmospheric Science, University of California, Berkeley. She studies interactions between climate change and biogeochemical cycles and models climate co-evolution with atmospheric CO_{2}. She contributed to the IPCC and is a member of the National Academy of Sciences. She has been a fellow of NASA, the American Geophysical Union, and the American Meteorological Society.
- Laura Gallardo: Professor at the Geophysics Department (DGF), University of Chile and was the former Director for the Center of Excellence for Climate and Resilience Research, Chile. Her research interests include atmospheric modeling and data assimilation, air quality in mega cities, and aerosol-cloud-climate interactions. She is a lead author of the IPCC AR6.
- Jacquelyn Gill: paleoecologist researching climate change and extinction in the ice age fossil record and Assistant Professor of Paleoecology and Plant Ecology at the University of Maine.
- Genevieve Guenther: Affiliate Faculty at the Tishman Environment and Design Center at The New School, she researches climate-change communication. She is an expert reviewer for the working group III of IPCC's Sixth Assessment Report.
- Joyeeta Gupta: Professor of environment and development in the global south at the Amsterdam Institute for Social Science Research of the University of Amsterdam and UNESCO-IHE Institute for Water Education in Delft. She is a member of the Amsterdam Global Change Institute. She is a lead author of the IPCC and author of several books about global climate governance.
- Heide Hackmann: Chief Executive Officer, International Council for Science and former executive director, International Social Science Council (ISSC). She is a specialist in science policy studies, the governance of science, and research evaluation.
- Joanna Haigh: BBC Womans Hour Top 30 Power List of 2020, retired professor of Atmospheric Physics at Imperial College London and co-director of the Grantham Institute for Climate Change and the Environment. She is a Fellow of the Royal Society, a former head of the Department of Physics at Imperial College London, and a former president—now a vice-president—of the Royal Meteorological Society. She is an expert in solar variability and climate modelling.
- Sharina Abdul Halim: Environmental Sociologist at the Institute for Environment and Development, University Kebangsaan Malaysia, Malaysia. Her research focuses on islands and indigenous communities, sustainable livelihoods, tourism development and heritage conservation. She is a lead author for Chapter 5 on the IPCC 1.5-C Special Report and Chapter 10 for the Working Group II of the IPCC AR6.
- Sandy Harrison: Professor in Global Palaeoclimates and Biogeochemical Cycles at the University of Reading.
- Katharine Hayhoe: Professor at Texas Tech University where she is director of the Climate Science Center. She is well known for her efforts to communicate faith based, especially Christian, concern about climate change and was an author of the US National Climate Assessment.
- Ann Henderson-Sellers: Emeritus Professor of the Department of Environment and Geography and founding director of the Climate Impacts Center at Macquarie University, Sydney. Former director of the World Climate Research Programme and the Environment Division at ANTSO. She was a convening lead author for the IPCC SAR. She is an elected Fellow of Australia's Academy of Technological Sciences and Engineering. Her research comprises an intentional re-development of traditional climate science to communicate directly in the language of economics, policy, and regulation.
- Ellie Highwood: Professor of Climate Physics at the Department of Meteorology, University of Reading and Dean for Diversity and Inclusion at the University of Reading in the UK. Her research interest focus around atmospheric aerosols, climate change, science outreach, diversity and inclusion.
- Kathryn Hochstetler: Professor of International Development at London School of Economics. Her research is on the role of emerging powers in global climate politics, with a special focus on renewable electricity in Brazil and South Africa.
- Marika Holland: Senior scientist at the National Center for Atmospheric Research (NCAR) USA and until recently the chief scientist of the Community Earth System Model. Her research is on the role of sea ice in the climate system. IPCC author.
- Lesley Hughes: Distinguished Professor of Biology, a former federal Climate Commissioner and former Lead Author in the IPCC's 4th and 5th Assessment Report and Pro Vice-Chancellor (Research Integrity & Development) at Macquarie University. Her research has mainly focused on the impacts of climate change on species and ecosystems.
- Antonina Ivanova Boncheva: Professor at the Department of Economics, Autonomous University of Baja California Sur, Mexico. Her expertise and interest include renewable energy, sustainable tourism, sustainable development, climate change policies, development economics and development planning. She is a lead author of the IPCC AR6.
- Katharine Jacobs: Director of the Center for Climate Adaptation Science and Solutions (CCASS), Institute of the Environment, University of Arizona. CCASS builds and supports climate change adaptation and assessment capacity at regional, national and international scales. Jacobs is a full professor in Soil, Water and Environmental Science at the University of Arizona. From 2009 - 2013 Jacobs served as director of the U.S. National Climate Assessment and Assistant Director, Energy and Environment Division, Office of Science and Technology Policy, Executive Office of the President, USA.
- Jill Jager (Williams): Independent Scholar, former executive director of the International Human Dimensions Programme on Global Environmental Change (IHDP) (1999 until 2002) and senior researcher at the Sustainable Europe Research Institute (SERI), Austria (2004 until 2008). She studies research themes ranging from energy and climate, biodiversity, global responsibility, public and stakeholder participation, integrating policies to linkages between knowledge and action for sustainable development.
- Hui Ju: Based at the Institute of Environment and Sustainable Development in Agriculture, Chinese Academy of Agricultural Sciences, China. Her research includes studying wheat quality, drought characteristics and impacts of climate change on evapotranspiration in the Huang-Huai-Hai plain in China. She is a lead author of the IPCC AR6.
- Suzana Kahn Ribeiro: Professor at COPPE, Federal University of Rio de Janeiro, Brazil. She researches renewable energy, climate change, urban mitigation alternatives and sustainable mobility. She is the coordinator of UFRJ Green Fund and the president of the Scientific Committee of Brazilian Panel on Climate Change. She served as a vice president of Working Group III for the IPCC AR5 report and currently serves as a coordinating lead author of the IPCC AR6.
- Mary Therese Kalin Arroyo: Director of the Institute of Ecology and Biodiversity at the University of Chile in Santiago and winner of the Chilean National Prize in Natural Science in 2010. Her research interests center on the conservation of biodiversity of Mediterranean ecosystems and temperate forests of South America. She is a foreign associate of the US National Academy of Sciences, a member of the Chilean Academy of Sciences, and an honorary member of the Royal Society of New Zealand.
- Astrid Kiendler-Scharr: Director of the Institute for Energy and Climate Research IEK-8: Troposphäre, Germany. Her research interests include organic aerosol, atmospheric chemistry, aerosol and climate interactions, and atmospheric-biosphere exchange and feedback. She is a lead author of IPCC AR6.
- Şiir Kilkis: Associate Professor of Energy Systems Engineering at METU, Turkey and a senior researcher and advisor to the President at The Scientific and Technological Research Council of Turkey. Her research includes development of SDEWES Index, novel net-zero district concepts and the Rational Exergy Management Model to curb carbon dioxide emissions. She is also a lead author of the IPCC AR6.
- Nana Ama Browne Klutse: Senior Lecturer at the Department of Physics, University of Ghana. Her research focuses on understanding climate dynamics and variability from observations, mainly of West Africa and the African Monsoon. Previously she worked at the Ghana Space Science and Technology Institute of the Ghana Atomic Energy Commission as a senior research scientist. She currently serves as a lead author of the IPCC AR6.
- Sari Kovats: Associate Professor in the Department of Social and Environmental Research in the Faculty of Public Health and Policy. She is the knowledge mobilization lead for the NIHR Health Protection Research Unit in Environmental Change and Health, led by the London School of Hygiene & Tropical Medicine in partnership with Public Health England (PHE). She researches the effects of weather and climate on human health, including health impact assessments of climate change and epidemiological studies of the effects of climate, weather and weather events in urban and rural populations. She was a co-coordinating lead author of the Chapter 23 on Europe for the 5th IPCC Assessment Report.
- Svitlana Krakovska: Head of Applied Climatology Laboratory at Ukrainian Hydrometeorological Institute and senior scientist at National Antarctic Scientific Centre, Ukraine. Her expertise includes numerical modeling, atmospheric physics, climate change, climate variability and meteorology. She is a review editor of IPCC 1.5 C Special Report and a lead author of IPCC AR6.
- Won-Tae Kwon: Managing Director of APEC Climate Center and Science Advisor of National Institute of Meteorological Research, Korea. Her research interests include climate variability, precipitation, time series analysis, climate change and statistical modeling. She is a lead author of the IPCC AR6 report.
- Alice Larkin: Professor of Climate Science and Energy Policy. Head of the School of Engineering] at the University of Manchester (UK) and member of the Tyndall Centre for Climate Change Research. Trained as a physicist, Professor Larkin's research now focuses on reducing emissions from the energy system, with specialist interest in the aviation and shipping sectors.
- Corinne Le Quéré: Professor of Climate Change Science at University of East Angelia and former director of the Tyndall Center for Climate Change at the University of East Anglia, UK whose research has made major contributions to carbon sciences and contributed to the annual carbon budgets of the ICSU Global Carbon project. She is the chair of France's High Council on climate and she is also a member of the UK Committee on Climate Change.
- June-yi Lee: Assistant Professor at IBS Center for Climate Physics, Pusan National University, Korea. Her research interests include paleo monsoon variability, earth system predictability including biogeochemical cycle with physical variables, and nearterm climate predictability and projection. She is a coordinating lead author of the IPCC AR6 report.
- Margaret Leinen: Director of the Scripps Institution of Oceanography at the University of California, San Diego. She is an expert in paleoclimate, climate impacts on the ocean, climate engineering. She also serves as UC San Diego's vice chancellor for marine sciences and dean of the School of Marine Sciences. She formally served as Vice Provost for Marine and Environmental Initiatives and executive director of Harbor Branch Oceanographic Institute, a unit of Florida Atlantic University.
- Maria Fernanda Lemos: Professor of Urban Planning and Design at Pontifical Catholic University of Rio de Janeiro, Brazil. Her research focuses mainly on cities adaptation for climate change, urban resilience and sustainability and social housing. She is the lead author of Urban Areas in Coastal Zones, ARC3-2, and of the UCCRN-LA and a member of UCCRN (Urban Climate Change Research Network). She is also the coordinating lead author of IPCC AR6, Central and South America Chapter.
- Maria Carmen Lemos: Professor of Natural Resources and Environment at the University of Michigan and her broad research interest include climate adaptation and role of knowledge in building adaptive capacity. She was a lead author of IPCC's 5th Assessment Report and the 4th US National Climate Assessment.
- Debora Ley: Economic Affairs Officer of Energy and Natural Resources at the Economic Commission for Latin America and the Caribbean (ECLAC), Chile. She is a lead author of IPCC 1.5 C Special Report and the IPCC AR6 report. She is an experienced renewable energy and climate change specialist who worked across different sectors and at different scales from grassroots to regional level in the field of clean energy and climate change mitigation and adaptation.
- Hong Liao: Professor at Nanjing University of Information Science and Technology, China. Her research focuses on global and regional modeling of air pollutants and their effects on climate change. She is a member of the World Climate Research Programme and a lead author of the IPCC AR6 report.
- Diana Liverman: Professor of Geography and Development and formerly co-director of the Institute of the Environment at the University of Arizona USA and expert on the human dimensions of climate change. IPCC author. ICSU.
- Emma Liwenga: Senior Lecturer at the Institute of Resource Assessment, University of Dar es Salaam, Tanzania. Her research focuses on agriculture, food and livelihood security, natural resource management and climate change adaptation. She was an author of the IPCC Special Report on Land and Climate Change and currently serves as a coordinating lead author of IPCC AR6 report.
- Jane Lubchenco: Professor of environmental science and marine ecology at Oregon State University. Former Administrator of NOAA and Under Secretary of Commerce for Oceans and Atmosphere (2009-2013). Her research interests include interactions between the environment and human well-being, biodiversity, climate change, and sustainable use of oceans and the planet. Nominated by President Obama in December 2008 as part of his "Science Dream Team".
- Amanda Lynch: Professor of Earth, Environmental and Planetary Sciences at Brown University and the founding director of the Institute at Brown for Environment and Society. She is an expert in polar climate system modelling, indigenous environmental knowledge and climate policy analysis. She is a Fellow of the American Meteorological Society, the Australian Academy of Technological Sciences and Engineering and the Norwegian Scientific Academy for Polar Research.
- Graciela Magrin: Researcher at the Institute of Climate and Water at Instituto Nacional de Tecnologia Agropecuaria (INTA) in Argentina. She participated in the IPCC and served as Training Material Reviewer of vulnerability and adaptation assessment related to climate change in the agriculture sector at the UNFCCC Secretariat in Germany. She specializes in climate change, vegetal ecophysiology, and agrometeorology.
- Jennifer Marohasy: Australian biologist, columnist and blogger. She was a senior fellow at the free-market think tank, the Melbourne-based Institute of Public Affairs between 2004 and 2009 and director of the Australian Environment Foundation until 2008.
- Paulina Martinetto: Researcher at National Scientific and Technical Research Council, Buenos Aires, Argentina. Her research focuses on ecology of nearshore marine ecosystems, climate change, and answering fundamental questions related to carbon budget in coastal and shelf ecosystems of the South West Atlantic. She is a lead author of the IPCC AR6 report.
- Kate Marvel: New York City based climate scientist and science writer. She is an Associate Research Scientist at NASA Goddard Institute for Space Studies and Columbia Engineering's Department of Applied Physics and Mathematics. She writes regularly in her column "Hot Planet." for Scientific American.
- Catherine Masao: Lecturer at the Institute of Resource Assessment, University of Dar es Salaam, Tanzania. Her research interests include conservation biology, ecology, biodiversity management and impact assessments. Currently, she is contributing as a lead author for the IPCC AR6 report.
- Valerie Masson-Delmotte: leading French climate scientist and research director at the Climate and Environment Sciences Laboratory of the French Alternative Energies and Atomic Energy Commission (Commissariat à l'énergie atomique et aux énergies alternatives, CEA)
- Valérie Masson-Delmotte: Senior researcher at the Laboratoire des Science du Climat et de l'environnement, France. Co-chair of IPCC Working Group I. She specializes in reconstructing and understanding past climate variations using natural archives, stable isotopes and climate models.
- Ritu Mathur: Director of Integrated Assessments and Modelling at The Energy and Resource Institute (TERI), India. She is also an Adjunct Faculty in the Department of Energy and Environment at TERI School of Advanced Studies. For the past two decades, she has been working in the field of sustainable development, energy security, mitigation and climate change. She has experience with IPCC assessments and has contributed to other national and global scientific assessments. Currently, she serves as a lead author to the IPCC AR6 report.
- Pamela Matson: Professor of Environmental Studies and former Dean of Earth Sciences at Stanford University, US; scholar of land use and sustainability science and member of the US National Academy of Sciences.
- Rachel McCarthy (1984-) Former expert scientist at the Met Office, specialising in Disaster Risk and Reduction. Special Advisor to the UK Government. Advisor to the European Commission on the scientific veracity of bids for part of €20M public funding. She is a pioneer in combining science and the arts.
- Shannon McNeeley: Senior Researcher at the Pacific Institute and formerly a research scientist at the North Central Climate Adaptation Science Center at Colorado State University. She focuses on water and climate environmental justice for frontline communities and incorporates both natural and social sciences approach in her research. She was an author of third and fourth U.S. National Climate Assessment and currently serves on the steering committee of upcoming fifth National Adaptation Forum.
- Linda Mearns: Senior scientist at the National Center for Atmospheric Research (NCAR) USA who works on regional climate models and climate impacts. IPCC author.
- Liliana Raquel Miranda Sara: Founder and Executive Director of Cities for Life Foro, Peru. She is an architect, urban environmental planner, researcher and an activist. Her research focuses on climate change, cities, water, sustainable construction and justice issues. She is an Ashoka Fellow who designed and implemented pilot projects to promote sustainable building. Currently, she is serving as a lead author of Chapter 6 on Cities for the IPCC AR6 report.
- Mariana Moncassim Vale: Associate Professor at the Department of Ecology of the Federal University of Rio de Janeiro, Brazil. She works in the Brazilian Atlantic Forest, the Amazon and focuses mainly on systematic conservation planning, ecosystem services, climate change, roadless areas, and GIS to prioritize species and area conservation. She is also a lead author for the IPCC AR6 report.
- Linda Mortsch: Senior Researcher, Adaptation and Impacts Research Division, Environment Canada. Adjunct in the Faculty of Environment at the University of Waterloo. She researches on the impact of climate change on water resources and wetlands in Canada, climate change scenario development, and "effective" communication of climate change information. She is a contributing author of the IPCC.
- Suzanne Moser: Consultant and researcher from Santa Cruz, California, USA who works on climate change impacts on coastal regions and on communication of climate information. ICSU committees.
- Aditi Mukherji: Principal Researcher at International Water Management Institute, India. Her expertise lies in climate change adaptation, groundwater institutions and policies, community management for water resources, political ecology, and water-energy-food nexus. Before IWMI, she was a theme leader of water and air at the International Centre for Integrated Mountain Development (ICIMOD). Currently, she serves as a coordinating lead author of the IPCC AR6 report.
- Maria Silvia Muylaert De Araujo: Based at Federal University of Rio de Janeiro, Brazil. Her research focuses on land use change and renewable energy. She is the Assistant of the Rio de Janeiro State Government's Environment Secretary since 2007. She has contributed to IPCC work as a lead author in the IPCC AR5 and currently serves as a lead author of the IPCC AR6 report.
- Michelle Mycoo: Professor of Urban and Regional Planning in the Department of Geomatics Engineering and Land Management, The University of the West Indies, Trinidad and Tobago. She is the coordinating lead author of the IPCC AR6 chapter on small islands and has served as Senior Technical Expert to various international, regional and local agencies in the field of urban planning, sustainable land, climate change and more. Her research focuses on strengthening science, policy and practice alignment/interface for optimal land use, infrastructure provision and environmental management.
- Soojeong Meong: Senior Research Fellow at Korea Environment Institute, Korea. She is a review editor of the IPCC AR6 report.
- Sarah Myhre: climate and ocean scientist with expertise in the physical, biological, and chemical consequences of abrupt climate warming. A Ph.D. holder from the University of California at Davis, and has worked as a research associate at the University of Washington's School of Oceanography. She is a Kavli Fellow with the National Academy of Science.
- Sasha Naidoo: Researcher at the Council for Scientific and Industrial Research, South Africa. Her expertise lies in forest, wood anatomy, silviculture, wood science, climate change and environmental science. She is a lead author of the IPCC AR6 report.
- Sunita Narain: Director general of the India-based Centre for Science and Environment and the director of the Society for Environmental Communications and publisher of the bimonthly magazine, Down To Earth. She is an influential environmental activist with interests in democracy at different scales, climate change, and natural resource management.

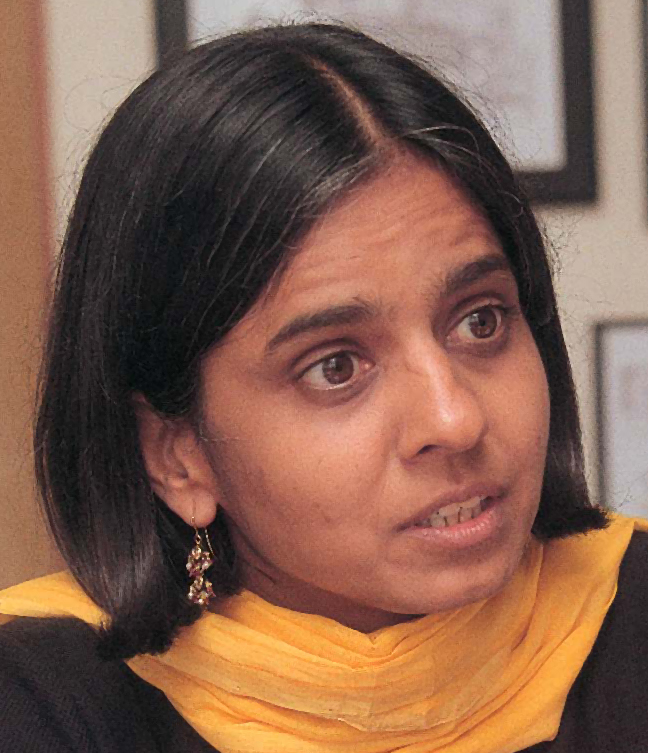
Sunita Narain CSE

- Gemma Terersa Narisma: Executive Director of the Manila Observatory, Philippines and the Head of the Regional Climate Systems programme from 2017 - 2021. She was also an associate professor of the Physics Department at Ateneo de Manila University. She served as a coordinating lead author of the IPCC AR6 Working Group I.
- Grace Ngaruiya: Head of the Ecology and Conservation Biology Section and a Lecturer in the Department of Plant Sciences at Kenyatta University, Kenya. She is also an IPCC AR6 lead author. Her research is focused on the relationship between climate change and Africa's heritage.
- Isabelle Niang: Professor at the University of Chiekh Anta Diop in Dakar. An expert in coastal erosion and climate change; coordinating lead author of the chapters on "Afrique du Groupe de travail II" for IPCC, in the 4th and 5th reports. Since 2008, she has been coordinating regional project ACCC (Adaptation au Changements Climatiques et Côtiers en Afrique de l'Ouest) and is based in BREDA/UNESCO. She is also Chair of the Pan-African Regional Committee for START (PACOM) through the Pan-African START Secretariat (PASS) based at the Institute for Resource Assessment (IRA) of the University of Dar es Salaam, Tanzania.
- Andrea J. Nightingale: Professor of Geography at the University of Oslo, Norway. An expert on the politics of climate change adaptation and mitigation, gender and intersectionality in relation to climate change and the politics of climate knowledge.
- Intan Nurhati: Senior Scientist at the Research Centre for Oceanography, Indonesian Institute of Sciences, Indonesia. Her research focuses include indo-pacific climate variability, marine pollution and ocean acidification, and coral calcification in changing oceans. She is a lead author of the IPCC AR6 report.
- Karen O'Brien: Professor of Geography at the University of Oslo, Norway who works on the human dimensions of global environmental change and societal transformation. IPCC author, ICSU committees
- Adenike Oladosu is a Nigerian climate activist and initiator of the school strike for climate in Nigeria, In 2019, she was selected for the first UN Youth Climate Summit in New York. Recognized by UNICEF Nigeria as a young change-maker, she's leading a grassroots movement called ILeadClimate, advocating for the restoration of Lake Chad and youth involvement in climate justice through education.
- Chioma Daisy Onyige-Ebeniro: Fellow at Kate Hamburger Centre for Advanced Study in the Humanities, The University of Bonn, Germany. She was an Assistant Professor of Sociology at University of Port Harcourt, Nigeria. Her expertise lies in criminology, gender and crime, and environmental issues. She is a lead author of IPCC Sixth Assessment Report.
- Naomi Oreskes: world-renowned geologist, historian and a Henry Charles Lea Professor of the History of Science at Harvard university. She is a leading voice on the role of science in society and the reality of anthropogenic climate change.
- Elinor Ostrom: Professor of Political Science at Indiana University, USA who won the Nobel Prize for Economics and worked on the management of common property resources and sustainability.
- Bette Otto-Bliesner: Senior Scientist at the National Center for Atmospheric Research (NCAR) in Boulder, Colorado, and serves as head of NCAR's Paleoclimate Modeling Program. She is an expert in using computer-based models of Earth's climate system to investigate past climate change and climate variability across a wide range of time scales. IPCC author.
- Jean Palutikof: Founding Director of the National Climate Change Adaptation Research Facility (NCCARF) at Griffith University, Australia. Her research focuses on the application of climatic data to economic and planning issues, especially extreme events and their impacts. IPCC author.
- Swapna Panickal: Scientist at the Centre for Climate Change Research, Indian Institute of Tropical Meteorology, India. Her research focuses on the state-of-the-art earth system models to better predict the impact of climate change on the Indian monsoon. She is also a lead author of the IPCC Sixth Assessment Report.
- Jyoti Parikh: Executive Director of Integrated Research and Action for Development IRADe. She is an expert on energy and environment problems of developing countries. She served as an energy consultant to the World Bank, the U.S. Department of Energy, EEC, Brussels and UN institutions such as UNIDO, FAO, UNU, UNESCO, and as an Environment Consultant to UNDP. IPCC author.
- Joyce E. Penner: Professor of Atmospheric Science at University of Michigan. She studies cloud and aerosol interactions and cloud microphysics, climate and climate change, global tropospheric chemistry and budgets, and modelling. IPCC co-ordinating lead author.
- Joy Jacqueline Pereira: Vice Chair of the Working Group II of the IPCC Sixth Assessment Report. She is a professor and Principal Research Fellow at the Southeast Asia Disaster Prevention Research Initiative of the Institute for Environment and Development in University Kebangsaan Malaysia (SEADPRI-UKM), and Fellow of the Academy of Sciences Malaysia. Her research focuses on disaster risk reduction, climate change adaptation and mineral resource management for sustainable development, with a focus on linking science to policy. She has previously served as a coordinating lead author for Chapter 24 on Asia of the IPCC Fifth Assessment Report, Lead Author for the IPCC AR5 Synthesis Report and a Review Editor for the 2012 IPCC Special Report on Managing the Risks of Extreme Events and Disasters to Advance Climate Change Adaptation.
- Rosa Perez: Senior Research Fellow at the Manila Observatory and a climate scientist specializing in hydro-meteorology, disaster risk reduction and adaptation policies on climate change. She is a lead author in Chapter 18 of the Working Group II of the 6th IPCC assessment report. She served as reviewer and lead author in the earlier IPCC assessment reports. At the Philippines Climate Change Commission, she is a member of the National Panel of Technical Experts.
- Patricia Fernanda Pinho: Visiting Professor/Researcher at Institute of Advanced Studies, University of São Paulo, Brazil. Her research focuses on analysis of ecosystem services, human wellbeing, governance and climate change through socio-ecological lens. She is a lead author of Working Group II of IPCC AR6 and IPCC 1.5C Special Report. She has extensive experience in integrated impact analysis, vulnerabilities and adaptation to extreme events related to global environmental change.
- Vicky Pope: Head of the Climate Prediction Programme at the Hadley Centre, which provides independent scientific advice on climate change. Her research interests include developing and validating climate models.
- Joana Portugal Pereira: Senior Scientist at the IPCC Working Group III on Mitigation of Climate Change and holds a Visiting Researcher position at Centre for Environmental Policy, Imperial College, London, UK. Her research focuses on energy system innovations that mitigate local and global environmental impacts and her expertise includes energy scenario modelling, bioenergy, life cycle assessment and environmental modeling. She is a lead author of IPCC AR6 Report.
- Laura Ramajo Gallardo: Researcher at Center for Advanced Studies in Arid Zones, Chile. Her research interests include ocean observation, biological oceanography, biogeochemistry, climate change, ocean acidification, extreme events, fisheries and aquaculture and coastal communities. She is a lead author of the IPCC AR6.
- Kate Raworth: She is an American economist who says that the human world and the nonhuman environment can work together economically. She created the doughnut economics concept. She explains that the outside of the doughnut is our Earth's ecological barrier and the inside circle is our social foundations. She says that in order to create a sustainable economy we must work within the rings. There is a give and take from each side that cannot be passed without consequences. She founded Doughnut Economics Action Lab which works to bring communities around the country to work within these donut rings.
- Maureen Raymo: Paleoclimatologist and marine geologist. Interim Director of the Lamont–Doherty Earth Observatory. She is the G. Unger Vetlesen Professor of Earth & Environmental Sciences and the director of the Lamont–Doherty Core Repository. She is best known for the Uplift-Weathering Hypothesis.
- Katherine Richardson Christensen: Professor in Biological Oceanography at the University of Copenhagen's Sustainability Science Center. She was one of the main organizers of the scientific conference, "Climate Change: Global Risks, Challenges and Decisions," which sought to inform the 2010 United Nations Climate Change Conference. She studies carbon cycling in the upper ocean and how biological processes impact food webs. She also researches planetary boundaries.
- Maisa Rojas: Associate Professor at the Department of Geophysics, University of Chile, Chile. Her research interests include paleoclimate study of the evolution and dynamics of the climate system in the southern hemisphere over the last 25,000 years, regional climate modeling and climate change impacts on different sectors of society. She contributed to IPCC's work during the 5th Assessment Report as a lead author and currently serves as a coordinating lead author of the IPCC AR6 report.
- Patricia Romero Lankao: Senior Research Scientist at NREL's Center for Integrated Mobility Sciences in joint appointment with University of Chicago's Mansueto Institute for Urban Innovation. Previously worked as a Scientist II at Research Applications Laboratory and Institute for the Study of Society and the Environment, National Center for Atmospheric Research (NCAR UCAR), former deputy director, Institute for the Study of Society and the Environment, NCAR, and former professor at the Metropolitan Autonomous University in Mexico City. She studies the intersection among energy and water systems, mobility, and the built environment in cities.
- Terry Root: Senior Fellow at the Woods Institute for Environment at Stanford University who works on ecosystems and climate change especially birds. IPCC author.
- Cynthia Rosenzweig: Researcher at the Goddard Institute for Space Studies (GISS) New York who works on climate impacts on agriculture and on cities. IPCC author.
- Joyashree Roy: Professor of Economics, Jadavpur University in India who is an expert on the Economics of Climate Change and IPCC author, awarded the Prince Sultan Bin Aziz Prize.
- Madilte Rusticucci: Full Professor at the Department of Atmospheric and Ocean Sciences, University of Buenos Aires, Argentina. She is an expert of Climate Change and has been part of the IPCC Assessment Report - Working Group I since 2007. Currently, she is a lead author of the IPCC AR6 - Physical Science Report.
- Nahla Samargandi: Associate Professor of Economics and Finance at King Abdulaziz University, Saudi Arabia. As an applied economist, she researches areas of economic growth, financial development, tourism, labor economics, environment and energy, and macroeconomics policy shocks. She is also a lead author of the investment and finance chapter of the upcoming IPCC Sixth Assessment Report - Working Group III.
- Lisa Schipper: Environmental Social Science Research Fellow at the Environmental Change Institute at the University of Oxford. With a PhD in Development Studies, she looks at the links between adaptation and development. She is a Co-ordinating Lead Author of Chapter 18 "Climate Resilient Development Pathways" in WG2 of the IPCC AR6 and co-Editor-in-Chief of the journal Climate and Development.
- Mary Scholes: Professor at the University of the Witwatersrand, Johannesburg who has served on several international global change committees. Studies plant physiology and biology, especially nutrient cycling, sustainable agroforestry, and soil biology. She is a fellow of the Royal Society of South Africa.
- Miranda Schreurs: Professor of Environmental and Climate Policy, Bavarian School of Public Policy, Technical University of Munich specialises in comparative environmental and climate governance. She has written on climate policy making in multiple world regions including Canada, China, the European Union, Germany, Japan, and the United States.
- Sybil P. Seitzinger: Professor of Nutrient Biogeochemistry at the Rutgers University Institute of Marine and Coastal Sciences and executive director of the International Geosphere-Biosphere Programme. Her Rutgers research group focuses on the sources and transport of nutrients (N, C, P) in watersheds and airsheds and their effect on aquatic ecosystems.
- Sonia I. Seneviratne: Swiss climate scientist, professor at the Institute for Atmospheric and Climate Science of the ETH Zurich. She is a specialist of extreme climate events.
- Maria Isabel Serrano Diná: Environment and Sustainability Consultant at Eco By Serrano and a Teacher of Architecture and Environment at Pontificia Universidad Catolica, Madre y Maestra, Dominican Republic. Her expertise lies in passive architecture, ecological design, environment, organic agriculture, recycling, sustainability, urban resilience, regenerative landscaping and climate change. She is also a review editor of the Building Chapter of the IPCC AR6 Working Group III.
- Karen Seto: Professor of Geography and Urbanization Science at Yale University. She is a geographer, urban and land change scientist; Her research focuses on the human transformation of land and the links between urbanization, global change, and sustainability. She co-founded and co-chaired the Urbanization and Global Environmental Change Project (UGEC) of the International Human Dimensions Programme on Global Environmental Change (IHDP) from 2004 to 2016. She was Coordinating Lead Author for the IPCC Fifth Assessment Report and co-lead the urban mitigation chapter. She is a Coordinating Lead Author for the urban mitigation chapter for the IPCC Sixth Assessment Report. She is a member of the US National Academy of Sciences.
- Joanne Simpson: (1923 – 2010) First woman to ever receive a Ph.D. in meteorology. She was graduated from the University of Chicago and taught and researched at numerous universities. She was a member of the National Academy of Engineering. Simpson contributed to many areas of the atmospheric sciences and helped develop the Tropical Rainfall Measuring Mission (TRMM).
- Chandni Singh: Senior Research Consultant at the Indian Institute for Human Settlements (IIHS), India. Her research focuses on climate change adaptation, differential vulnerability and wellbeing, disaster risk, and rural-urban migration. She was a contributing author of the IPCC 1.5 C special report and is currently a lead author of the IPCC AR6 report.
- Julia Slingo: Meteorologist, climate scientist, visiting Professor at the University of Reading, and Chief Scientist at the British Met Office between 2009 and 2016. Her specific interests include tropical climate variability and its influence on the global climate and climate modelling. Slingo was the first female Professor of Meteorology in the UK as well as, in 2008, the first woman President of the Royal Meteorological Society.
- Amy Snover: Director of the University of Washington Climate Impacts Group, University Director of the Northwest Climate Science Center and Assistant Dean for Applied Research in the University of Washington's College of the Environment. Snover is a recognized leader for her work connecting decision-makers and stakeholders to the scientific data, tools, and guidance necessary for managing the climate risks facing the people, communities, and ecosystems across the Northwest of the United States. Amy was a 2015 White House Champion of Change for Climate Education and Literacy, a co-convening lead author for the Third US National Climate Assessment, and lead author of the groundbreaking 2007 guidebook, Preparing for Climate Change: A Guidebook for Local, Regional, and State Governments.
- Susan Solomon: Ellen Swallow Richards Professor of Atmospheric Chemistry & Climate Science known for her work on atmospheric chemistry and ozone and for leading the IPCC 4th assessment report on climate science. Member US National Academy of Sciences. She won the Volvo Environment and Blue Planet prizes.
- Anna Amelia Sörensson: Researcher at the Center for Ocean and Atmospheric Sciences (CIMA / CONICET-UBA), Argentina. Her research interests include climate change, climate modeling and variability, hydrology and precipitation. In the latest IPCC Sixth Assessment Report, she is serving as a coordinating lead author of Working Group I - Chapter 10: Linking global to regional climate change.
- Tannecia Stephenson: Senior Lecturer/Professor of Physics at The University of West Indies, Jamaica. Her research focuses on climate variability and seasonal prediction, climate extremes, climate change impacts and solar energy. She is a lead author of the IPCC AR6 report - Working Group I.
- Nicole Stevens: Ecologist and Trapnell Fellow at Environmental Change Institute, University of Oxford, UK. She is also affiliated with Stellenbosch University, South Africa. Her work examines the impact of global change on non-forested ecosystems in Africa and seeks to understand the mechanisms that shape plant distribution ranges. She is a lead author of the IPCC AR6 report.
- Leah Stokes: Professor in the Department of Political Science at UC Santa Barbara. Senior policy consultant at Evergreen Action and Rewiring America. Hosts the climate podcast A Matter of Degrees. Her research focuses on political behavior, public opinion, and the politics of energy and environmental policy in the United States.
- Linda Yanti Sulistiawati: Senior Research Fellow at APCEL and also an Associate Professor of Law in Universitas Gadjah Mada, Indonesia. Her research focuses on climate change, REDD+, land issues and customary (adat) issues. She was a member of the Indonesian delegation at the Paris Climate Agreement in 2015. Currently, she serves as a lead author for the IPCC Sixth Assessment Report.
- Ying Sun: Works at the National Climate Center, China Meteorological Administration, Beijing, China. She is a lead author of the IPCC AR6 report.
- Xianchun Tan: Professor at the Institute of Policy and Management, Chinese Academy of Sciences, Beijing, China. She is a lead author of the IPCC Sixth Assessment Report.
- Adelle Thomas: Senior Fellow at University of The Bahamas, Bahamas. She is a human environment geographer, focused on climate change adaptation and loss and damage. At Climate Analytics, she is the Vulnerability, Adaptation and Gender Expert, along with her position as Senior Caribbean Research Associate. She is a lead author for the IPCC Sixth Assessment Report, Working Group II and also served as a lead author for the IPCC Special Report on 1.5C.
- LuAnne Thompson: Professor of Oceanography at the University of Washington known for her work in communicating climate science and drawing connections between climate change and environmental sustainability, health and socioeconomic inequities.
- Sirintornthep Towprayoon: Associate Professor at the Joint Graduate School of Energy and Environment, King Mongkut's University of Technology Thonburi, Thailand. Her research interests include greenhouse gas inventories, municipal solid waste management, biogas from waste, methane emission and low carbon scenario. She is a lead author of the IPCC AR6 Report.
- Diána Ürge-Vorsatz: Director, Center for Climate Change and Sustainable Energy Policy (3CSEP) and Professor of Environmental Sciences and Policy, Central European University. She specializes in environmental and energy studies especially energy efficiency and buildings. IPCC author.
- Kripa Vasant: Based at the Central Marine Fisheries Research Institute, Indian Council of Agricultural Research, India. She is a lead author of the IPCC Sixth Assessment Report.
- Isabella Velicogna: Professor of Earth System Science at the University of California Irvine known for her work on time-variable space borne gravity to study the mass balance of ice sheets and changes in terrestrial water storage. IPCC. Thomson Reuters HCR. EGU Vening Meinesz Medal. Kavli fellow of NAS.
- Carolina Vera: Director of the Center for Atmosphere and Ocean Sciences (CIMA) and UMI/IFAECI, a joint institute with the University of Buenos Aires (UBA), Argentina's National Council of Sciences (CONICET) and CNRS (France). She is also Full Professor of the School of Exact and Natural Sciences of the University of Buenos Aires. IPCC special report on extremes author.
- Maria Virginia Vilariño: Climate and Energy Manager at the Argentinian Business Council for Sustainable Development, Argentina. Her expertise includes sustainability, climate change and sustainable management tools for different economic sectors. She leads the Circular Economy Initiative in Argentina, in cooperation with GIZ to identify circular models and practices in different economic sectors and assess the contribution of the circular economy to climate goals in Argentina. She is a lead author of the IPCC 5th Assessment WG3 report on climate mitigation and a lead author of the IPCC 1.5C Special Report (SR1.5). She is also a lead author of the IPCC AR6 Report.
- Coleen Vogel: Independent Consultant and previously Professor of Sustainability at the University of Witwatersrand, Johannesburg. She chaired the International Scientific Committee of the International Human Dimensions Programme on Climate Change and is an IPCC author. Her research has focused on climate vulnerability and southern Africa.
- Penny Whetton (1958–2019): Climatologist and an expert in regional climate change projections due to global warming their impacts. Her primary scientific focus was Australia. IPCC author.
- Kathy Willis: Ecologist who is the director of science at Kew Gardens, UK, and a professor at Oxford University who works on ecology, environmental history and biodiversity.
- Julie Winkler: Professor at Michigan State University and past president of the Association of American Geographers; her work focuses on climate change impacts in the Great Lakes and midwestern United States.
- Libo Wu: Managing Director of the Center for Energy Economics and Strategy Studies and an associate professor at the School of Economics, Fudan University, China. Her research interests include natural resource economics, economic modeling, and climate change. She serves as a lead author of the IPCC AR6 Report.
- Zelina Zaiton Ibrahim: Associate Professor at the Department of Environmental Management, University Putra Malaysia, Malaysia. Her research focuses on catchment pollution estimation, estuarine and coastal processes to physical oceanography. She is a coordinating lead author of the IPCC AR6 report.
- Sumaya A. Zakieldeen: Assistant Professor at the Institute of Environmental Studies, University of Khartoum, Sudan. She researches climate change impacts and was part of the Sudanese delegation to the COP. She is also a lead author of the IPCC AR6 report.
- Azar Zarrin: Associate Professor at the Department of Geography, Ferdowsi University of Mashhad, Iran. She is the Director of Climate Research Institute, ASMERC, Iran and Eco Regional Center for Risk Management of Natural Disasters in Mashhad, Iran. Her research interests include regional and meso-scale climate modeling, climate variability and change, extreme weather, climatology of arid lands and Middle East. She is a review editor of the Chapter 2 of IPCC AR6, Working Group I.
- Hua Zhang: Professor at the National Climate Center, China Meteorological Administration, China. Her research interests include greenhouse gas effects, aerosol-cloud-radiation interaction, radiative forcing, modeling simulation and integration study. She is a lead author of the IPCC AR6 report.
- Yan Zheng: Based at the Chinese Academy of Social Sciences, China. Her research interests include climate change, urban vulnerability, adaptation, and risk governance. She is a lead author of the IPCC AR6 report.
- Kirsten Zickfeld: Associate Professor at Simon Fraser University, Canada, working on the effects of anthropogenic emissions of greenhouse gases and aerosols on climate on centennial to millennial timescales.
- Gina Ziervogel: Associate Professor in the Department of Environmental and Geographical Science at the University of Cape Town, South Africa. Her research interests include climate change adaptation and resilience across scales, multi-level governance of urban adaptation, and social justice. She is a lead author of the IPCC AR6 report.
- Zinta Zommers: Mercy Corp's Head of the Zurich Flood Resilience Alliance and is a Rhodes and Commonwealth Scholar from Latvia. Her work experience includes providing support to the United Nations' Secretary-General's support team during the Paris Negotiation with the United Nations Environment and Food and Agriculture Organization, advising the United States' Government and the Government of Sierra Leone and co-editing a book on early warning systems for climate change. She is a review editor of the IPCC AR6.
- Zhiyan Zuo: Professor in the Department of Atmospheric and Ocean Sciences, Fudan University, China. She was formerly a researcher at the Chinese Academy of Meteorological Sciences. Her research focuses on land-atmosphere interaction, climate change, extreme events and asian monsoon. She currently serves as a lead author to the IPCC AR6 report.

== Women climate change policy makers and activists ==
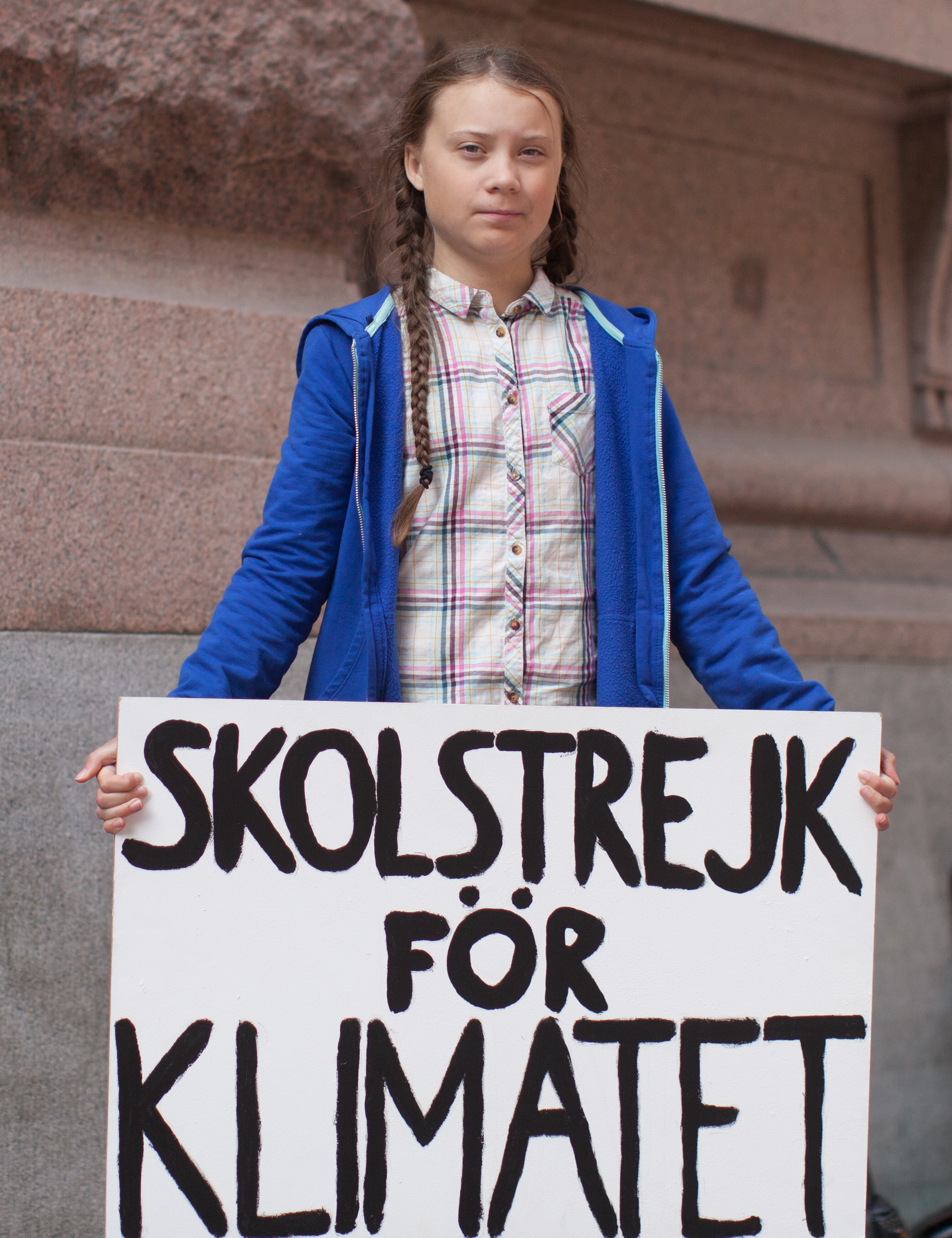
Thunberg on strike in 2018

- Franny Armstrong: British documentary film director known for films including The Age of Stupid, a reflection from 2055 about climate change. She founded the carbon reduction campaign 10:10 in 2009.
- Gro Harlem Brundtland: Former prime minister of Norway and author of the Brundtland report on Sustainable Development who has served on countless international committees on the environment.
- Kotchakorn Voraakhom: Thai landscape architect, public green space campaigner, Echoing Green Climate Fellow and chief executive officer of Porous City Network. She is also the founder of the Koungkuey Design Initiative.
- Helen Clark: Administrator of the United Nations Development Programme (UNDP), and the 37th Prime Minister of New Zealand (1999-2008). Clark's government implemented several major economic initiatives including the New Zealand Emissions Trading Scheme.
- Sheila Watt-Cloutier: Canadian Inuit activist who has focused on persistent organic pollutants and global warming, among other issues.
- Christiana Figueres: Costa Rican diplomat who has served in negotiations over climate change instruments since 1995. She became the Executive Secretary of the UN Framework Convention on Climate Change (UNFCCC) in 2010. She was the founder of the Global Optimism group and was also the head of the UN climate change convention which led to the Paris agreement in 2015.
- Fiona Godlee: Anglo-American doctor, editor and journalist. Founder member and board director of the Climate and Health Council. Executive committee for the UK Health Alliance on Climate Change.
- Genevieve Guenther: Founder and director of End Climate Silence and a nominee for the 2020 EcoAmerica American Climate Leadership Awards.
- Katharine Wilkinson: a writer and climate change activist and vice president at Project Drawdown. She is among the 2019 Time magazine's list of women who will save the world.
- Marie Christina Kolo: Climate activist, ecofeminist, and social entrepreneur from Madagascar, who has raised global awareness of the effects of climate change in Madagascar and requested international solidarity in addressing its impacts. She is the founder of Green N Kool and Ecofeminism Madagascar.
- Anne Simpson: CalPERS' director of board governance & strategy. She was part of Time magazine's list of 15 women leading the global fight on climate change, GreenBiz's list of 25 "kickass" women on climate change and Barron's (Dow Jones) list of 100 Most Influential Women in US Finance. She was previously senior faculty fellow and lecturer at the Yale School of Management, World Bank's head of the global corporate governance forum, first executive director of the International Corporate Governance Network and joint managing director of Pensions and Investment Research Consultants Limited.
- Wu Changhua: Chinese policy analyst and China/Asia Director of Office of Jeremy Rifkin. She is the Greater China director of The Climate Group, director of China studies of World Resources Institute, and editor of the English edition of China Environment News.
- Julia Marton-Lefevre: Hungarian environmentalist and academic who was Director General of IUCN, the International Union for Conservation of Nature, from 2007 to 2014 and formerly Rector of the UN University for Peace.
- Jacqueline McGlade: Marine biologist and environmental informatics professor. Her research focuses on the spatial and nonlinear dynamics of ecosystems, climate change and scenario development. She was head of the European Environment Bureau.
- Catherine McKenna: Canadian human rights and social justice lawyer and Minister of Environment and Climate Change in Justin Trudeau's cabinet.
- Mary Robinson: Former president of Ireland and UN Commissioner on Human Rights who now serves as the UN special envoy on climate change
- Margaret Klein Salamon: Executive Director of the Climate Emergency Fund, founder and principal of Climate Awakening, co-founder of The Climate Mobilization, and the author of the book, "Facing the Climate Emergency: How to Transform Yourself with Climate Truth."
- Marina Silva: Brazilian environmentalist, politician, Minister of Environment and former colleague of Chico Mendes. She ran in the 2010 and 2014 Brazilian elections.
- Greta Thunberg: Swedish activist who began protesting outside the Swedish parliament about the need for immediate action to combat climate change, also credited with initiating the school strike for climate movement in 2018 and 2019. She spoke for the UN Climate Action Summit in New York in September 2019.
- Hindou Oumarou Ibrahim: Chadian environmental activist and geographer, coordinator of the Association des Femmes Peules Autochtones du Chad (AFPAT, the association of indigenous Fulani women of Chad) and served as the co-chair of the International Indigenous Peoples Forum on Climate Change.
- Miranda Wang: Co-founder and CEO of BioCellection, 2018 UN Environment Programme's Young Champions of the Earth award for North America. She is also an Echoing Green Fellow, TED Speaker, and CNN Tomorrow's Hero.
- Jeanny Yao: Co-founder and CEO of BioCellection
- Rhiana Gunn-Wright: Director of climate policy at the Roosevelt Institute, formally the policy director for New Consensus. she is a Chamberlain Fellow of Women and Public Policy at the Institute for Women's Policy Research, and served on the policy team for former First Lady Michelle Obama. Worked with Alexandria Ocasio-Cortez as an author of the Green New Deal.
- Hilda Heine: First female president of the Republic of the Marshall Islands elected in January 2016, she served as Minister of Education during the tenure of former President Christopher J. Loeak. She is the co-founder of the women's rights group Women United Together Marshall Islands (WUTMI). She is one of the Pacific leaders who are focal about climate crisis and the chair of the Climate Vulnerable Forum.
- Tessa Khan: co-director of the Climate Litigation Network, and received an award from the Climate Breakthrough Project in 2018. She is known for her focus on international human rights law as a tool to dramatically increase national climate mitigation ambition.
- Rachel Kyte: Chief executive officer of the Sustainable Energy for All (SE4All), and Special Representative of the UN Secretary-General for Sustainable Energy for All. She previously served as World Bank Group vice president and Special Envoy for Climate Change and International Finance Corporation Vice President for Business Advisory Services. She is currently the dean at Fletcher School Inc.

== See also ==
- Climate change and gender
- Climate justice
- List of women climate scientists and activists
- List of climate scientists
- Women in science
- Women4Climate (C40 Cities)
