= CHN =

CHN may stand for:

== Places ==
- China's country code
  - People's Republic of China's ISO 3166-1 alpha-3 and IOC country code
  - Republic of China's IOC country code 1932–1956, now TPE
- Chennai, state capital of Tamil Nadu, India
- Jeonju Airport, South Korea, IATA airport code
- Cheshunt railway station, Hertfordshire, UK, by National Rail station code

== Networks ==
- Canadian Health Network
- City Hindus Network, London, UK
- Anglican religious orders
  - Community of the Holy Name, an Anglican religious order for women in England, Lesotho and South Africa
  - Community of the Holy Name (Australia), an Anglican religious order for women in Australia, unrelated to the English order
- Climate Heritage Network

== Chemistry ==
- CHN analyzer, measuring carbon, hydrogen, and nitrogen
- Chemical formula of hydrogen cyanide and hydrogen isocyanide

== Language ==
- Chinook Jargon (ISO 639: chn), trade language in the Pacific Northwest region of the U.S. and Canada
