= Ying Sun =

Ying Sun or Sun Ying may refer to:

- Ying Sun (environmental scientist)
- Ying Sun (mechanical engineer)
- Sun Ying (born 1936), Chinese politician

== See also ==
- Yin Shun (1906–2005), Chinese Buddhist monk
