= The Language of Climate Politics =

2024 non-fiction book by Genevieve Guenther

- Author: Genevieve Guenther
- Genre: Non fiction
- Publisher: Oxford University Press
- Publication date: 10 July 2024
- Pages: 280
- ISBN: 978-0-197-64223-8

The Language of Climate Politics: Fossil-Fuel Propaganda and How to Fight It is a 2024 non-fiction book by American author and climate activist Genevieve Guenther, published by Oxford University Press. The book deals with the phenomenon of climate change and public reactions to it, with Guenther suggesting ways to combat climate change denial through climate communication.

Yunyou Wang in a review for the Journal of Language and Politics wrote that Guenther's "timely exploration of climate rhetoric thus bridges environmental politics and discourse analysis, offering insight into how propaganda operates through everyday words." Kate Yoder of Grist wrote that "What Guenther’s book gets right is that conversations about climate change have to be steered away from tired talking points toward new, productive ground. But the book is positioned not so much as a guide to communication, but as a guide to taking a side in a battle of words." Gerald Kutney of the National Center for Science Education wrote that " the message in The Language of Climate Politics needs to be heard. Choosing the right words and new phrases, and finding common ground, to discuss climate change are good steps to take."
