= Jyoti Kirit Parikh =

Indian Climate Change Council member

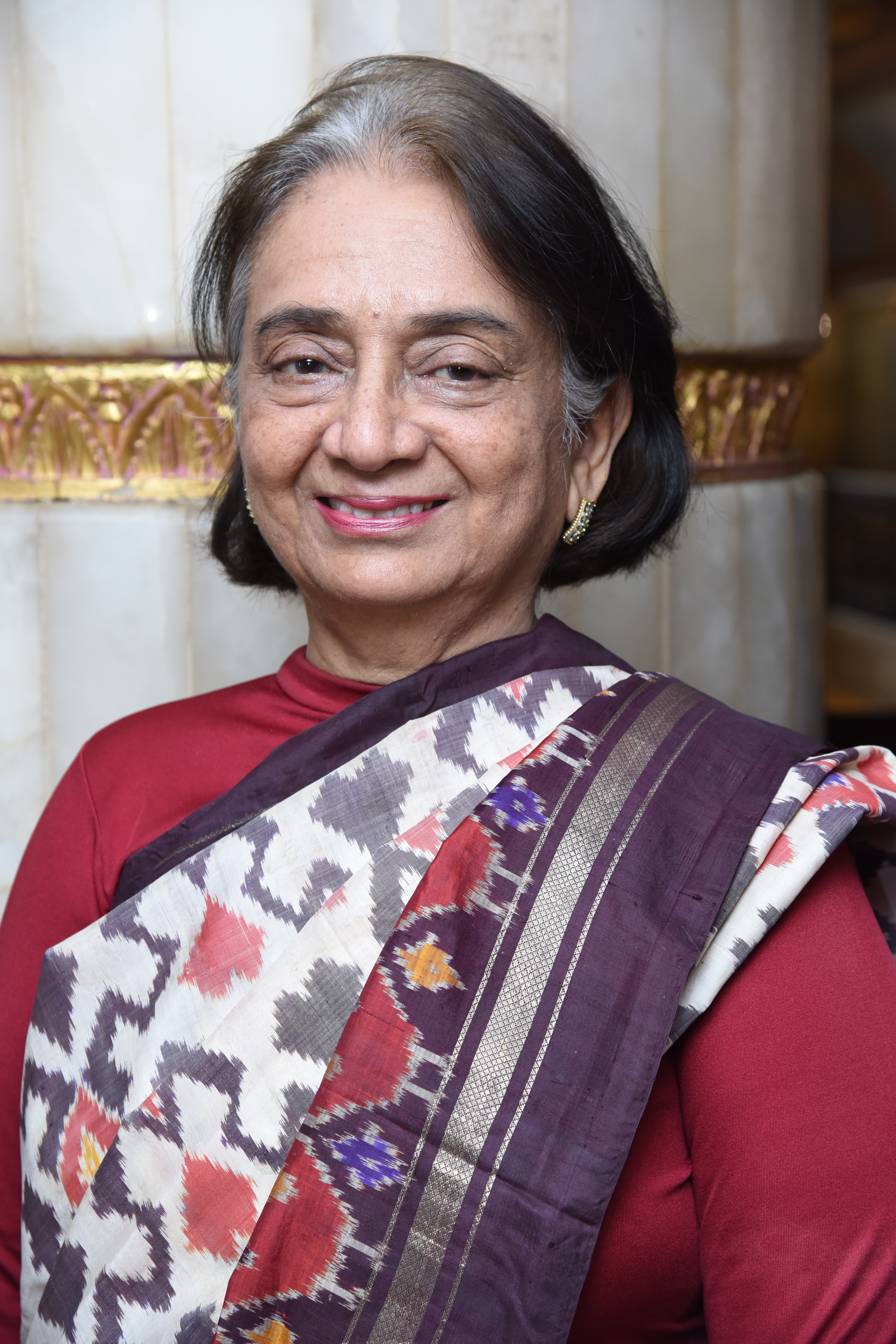
- Jyoti Parikh
- Born: 20 March 1941 (age 85); Ahmedabad, India
- Citizenship: India
- Education: UC Berkeley, University of Maryland, College Park
- Spouse: Kirit Parikh
- Awards: Nobel Peace Prize awarded To IPCC authors in 2007, Boutros Ghali Award, Bhasin Award
- Scientific career
- Workplaces: TIFAC, DST, IIASA, National Institution for Transforming India (Niti Aayog), UNU, IGIDR

Jyoti Kirit Parikh is the current Executive Director of Integrated Research and Action for Development (IRADe). She was a Member of the Prime Minister’s Council on Climate Change –India and is a recipient of Nobel Peace Prize awarded To IPCC authors in 2007. She was a Senior Professor at Indira Gandhi Institute of Development Research (IGIDR), Mumbai. She also worked at the International Institute for Applied Systems Analysis (IIASA), Austria and served as a senior energy consultant at the National Institution for Transforming India (Niti Aayog) (1978–80). She was a visiting professor at the Institute of Advanced Studies (IAS) of UNU, Tokyo (1995–96). She was the Acting Director of IGIDR for 1997-98. She has experience for nearly thirty years on energy and environment problems of the developing countries.

== Education ==
She received her M.Sc. in Physics and Mathematics from University of California, Berkeley, in 1964 and PhD in Theoretical Physics from University of Maryland, College Park in 1967.

== Career ==
Parikh has served as an energy consultant to the World Bank, the U.S. Department of Energy, EEC, Brussels and UN institutions such as UNIDO, FAO, UNU, UNESCO, and as an Environment Consultant to UNDP. From 1976-78 and 1980–86, she worked at the International Institute for Applied Systems Analysis (IIASA) in Austria, and from 1978–80, she served as a senior energy consultant for the Planning Commission of India in New Delhi. From 1986-2003, she served as Senior Professor and Acting Director of the Indira Gandhi Institute of Development Research (IGIDR) in Mumbai.

She has published more than 250 research papers and edited and co-authored 25 books and monographs. The publications are in the areas ranging from policy analysis of energy and environment, climate change policies, modeling, technology assessment, power sector, natural resource management, agriculture, health, poverty and gender. and natural resource management.

She has carried out a number of national and international projects. Her work spans over areas such as environment, energy demand modeling, power system simulations, biomass allocation in rural energy systems, energy policy, demand-side management in the electricity sector, impacts of climate change, mitigation, negotiations, adaptation, power system planning, natural resource accounting, sustainable development and restructuring consumption patterns, incremental costs and Global Environment Facility (GEF), supporting globally efficient projects by GEF, North-South issues in IPCC response strategies, Joint implementation of climate change projects: opportunities for North-South cooperation, trade and environment, and large scale survey on rural energy, water and sanitation, environmental economics for sustainable development into the decision-making process. It covers four major focal areas: Air Quality; Water Quality; Community Land Regeneration and Biodiversity within the overall framework of sustainable development.

Dr Parikh was a member of the Indian Prime Minister’s Council on Climate Change which is tasked with coordinating national action for assessment, adaptation, and mitigation of climate change.

As head of IRADe, she has motivated the institution to pursue independent social, economic, and scientific policy research with a focus on development and inclusive growth. The research is conducted within a multidisciplinary, multi-stakeholder framework in order to integrate different socio-economic perspectives and build on policy-level understanding by working on South Asia Power Tarde, Urban climate resilience and urban environment, Energy, Power and Climate Change.

== Personal ==
Parikh is married to Dr. Kirit Parikh. Her son Maulik Parikh is at Arizona State University and her daughter Anokhi Parikh is at Johannesburg, South Africa.

== Honors and awards ==
- As one of the IPCC authors, an organization whose work was recognized by the joint award of the 2007 Nobel Peace Prize
- Recipient of Women achievers award - 2000
- Recipient of Special Energy Award by IBPL Urja Research Foundation on the occasion of 50 years of independence of India - 1998
- Golden Jubilee for India's independence award for energy efficiency (1997)
- Recipient of second prize IFORS in "Operations Research for Development" (1996)
- Fellow of the National Academy of Sciences, India
- Recipient of a Gold Medal from the Systems Society of India
- Recipient of Boutros Ghali award by Japan Foundation for United nations
- Recipient of O P Bhasin prize for Science and Environment
