= Hannah Fluck =

British archaeologist

Hannah Fluck BA MA PhD, FSA AIF ACIfA
- Occupation: Archaeologist

Academic background
- Education: University of Oxford; University of Southampton
- Thesis: Non-biface assemblages in Middle Pleistocene Western Europe. A comparative study (2011)

Hannah Fluck is a British archaeologist specialising in heritage management in research and climate change policy and action as it relates to heritage practice. Fluck is Senior National Archaeologist at the National Trust and the former Head of Environmental Strategy at Historic England. Fluck works in climate heritage as a founding steering committee member of the Climate Heritage Network.

== Education ==
Fluck graduated from the University of Oxford with a Bachelor of Arts in Archaeology and Anthropology in 2000. She got completed a PhD in the archaeology of human evolution at the University of Southampton in 2011, with a thesis titled Non-biface assemblages in Middle Pleistocene Western Europe. A comparative study.

== Career ==
Fluck served as the Events Secretary for the Lithics Study Society from 2006 to 2010. Fluck worked as the Historic Environment Intelligence Officer in the Research Department of Historic England from 2015 to 2016, becoming the Head of Environmental Research in 2016 and the Head of Environmental Strategy in 2019. During her time at Historic England, Fluck was elected a Fellow of the Society of Antiquaries. In 2022, Fluck joined the National Trust as Senior National Archaeologist.

Fluck has worked as an External Advisor for Newcastle University's Centre for Landscape research, and an Affiliate of the Land, Environment, Economics and Policy Institute (LEEP) at University of Exeter. Fluck is on the steering committee for the Climate Heritage Network – which was founded at UN Climate Action Summit in 2018 – and serves as the Europe and the Commonwealth of Independent States (CIS) Vice Chair. Fluck is a Co-Investigator on two AHRC-funded research projects on heritage and climate change. She is one of the contributing authors for the UK Climate Change Risk Assessment 2022, and co-author of Historic England's Climate Change Adaptation Report with Ruth Knight. Fluck is also a trustee of the Council for British Archaeology.

== Selected publications ==
- UK Climate Risk Assessment (2022) By: Fluck, Hannah.
- Climate Change Adaptation Report (2024) By: Kate Guest, Claire Marchetti, Lucy More, Paul Lankester Other contributors: Claire Hedley, Tamsin Foster, Benedict Lyte. Historic England. : ISSN 2059-4453
- Quaternary palaeoecology and the historic environment: Challenges and opportunities for preserving England's wetlands (2023) By: Hazell, Zoë & Last, Jonathan & Campbell, Gill & Corcoran, Jane & Fluck, Hannah. Proceedings of the Geologists' Association. 134. 10.1016/j.pgeola.2022.11.002.
- Climate Change and Archaeology. An Introduction. Internet Archaeology (2022) By: Fluck, Hannah & Guest, Kate. 10.11141/ia.60.1.
- Climate Change and the Historic Environment (2021) By: Fluck, Hannah & Dawson, Michael. The Historic Environment: Policy & Practice. 12. 263-270. 10.1080/17567505.2021.1990492.
