= Fiona Godlee =

First female editor of The British Medical Journal

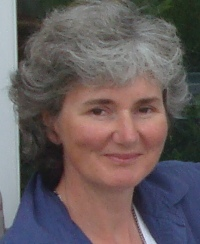
- Born: August 4, 1961 (age 65); San Francisco, California
- Education: University of Cambridge
- Scientific career
- Fields: Medicine
- Workplaces: Royal College of Physicians

Fiona Godlee (born August 4, 1961) was editor in chief of The British Medical Journal from March 2005 until 31 December 2021; she was the first female editor appointed in the journal's history. She was also editorial director of the other journals in BMJ's portfolio.

== Career ==
Fiona Godlee attended Bedales and Marlborough College boarding schools. She qualified as a doctor in 1985 at the University of Cambridge School of Clinical Medicine, having studied at Trinity College, Cambridge.

She trained as a general physician in London, and is a Fellow of the Royal College of Physicians. Since 1990 she has written on a broad range of issues for BMJ, including the impact of environmental degradation on health, the future of the World Health Organization, the ethics of academic publication, and the problems of editorial peer review.

In 1994, she spent a year at Harvard University as a Harkness Fellow evaluating efforts to bridge the gap between medical research and practice. On returning to the UK, she led the development of BMJ Clinical Evidence, which evaluates the best available evidence on the benefits and harms of treatments. In 2000, she moved to Current Science Group to help establish the open access online publisher BioMed Central as Editorial Director for Medicine. In 2003, she returned to the BMJ Group to head up its new Knowledge division. She has served as president of the World Association of Medical Editors (from January 2000 to December 2001) and Chair of the Committee on Publication Ethics (from 2004 on) and is co-editor of Peer Review in Health Sciences. From 2003 to 2005 she was head of BMJ Knowledge. She was editorial director, BioMed Central, Current Science Group.

Godlee was director and member of the board of BMJ, a founder and board member of the Climate and Health Council and on the executive committee for the UK Health Alliance on Climate Change.

At the BMJ she was succeeded by Kamran Abbasi.

She was elected a Fellow of the Academy of Medical Sciences in 2024.

In September 2025, she was arrested at a demonstration in Parliament Square supporting the proscribed terrorist group Palestine Action. She said, "It also feels particularly essential for health professionals to take a stand against the killing, maiming, and starvation of civilians, but it’s a big ask for working doctors who risk losing their licence to practise. Retired doctors like me have little or nothing to lose."

== Personal life ==
She lives in Cambridge with her husband and two children. Her paternal grandmother was born Barbara Lodge, youngest of the six daughters of the physicist Sir Oliver Lodge. On her paternal grandfather's side, she is a great great great grand daughter of Joseph Jackson Lister, pioneer of the compound microscope and father of Joseph Lister, 1st Baron Lister.
