= Indira Gandhi Institute of Development Research =

Civil Service Educational institution in India

- Type: Education and Research Institute
- Established: 1987; 39 years ago
- Parent institution: Reserve Bank of India
- Affiliations: UGC; NAAC
- Chairman: Governor of Reserve Bank of India
- Director: Basanta Kumar Pradhan
- Faculty: ~26
- Postgraduates: ~80
- Doctoral students: ~60
- Location: Mumbai, Maharashtra, India; 19°09′58″N 72°52′39″E
- Campus: Urban (14 acres)
- Website: www.igidr.ac.in

Indira Gandhi Institute of Development Research (IGIDR) is an advanced research and educational institution in Mumbai, India. The institute's mission is to carry out research on developmental issues from a multi-disciplinary point of view. This includes economics, energy and environmental policy.

The institute offers Ph.D. programmes in Development Studies and also a Master of Science programme in Economics. The institute has one of the largest social sciences libraries in Asia.

== History ==
The institute was the brainchild of Prof. Jyoti Parikh and Prof. Kirit Parikh and was funded by the Reserve Bank of India. It was formally opened upon the occasion of the bank's golden jubilee in 1987.

After its registration as an autonomous society on 14 November 1986 and as a public trust on 15 January 1987, then Prime Minister Shri Rajiv Gandhi inaugurated the campus at Goregaon, Mumbai on 28 December 1987. Subsequently, the institute was recognized as a deemed university under Section 3 of the UGC Act. It has its jurisdiction over entire state of Maharashtra.

Starting as a purely research-oriented institution, the institute quickly developed into a full-fledged teaching cum research organisation when in 1990 it launched a Ph.D. programme in the field of development studies under agreement with Bombay University. The objective of the Ph.D. programme is to produce analysts with diverse disciplinary background who can address developmental issues of policy. In 1995, accreditation for its own Ph.D. programme was obtained and a master's programme was started to help meet the growing need of the country for more development economists. The mission to address development issues has been the driving force and motivation behind the growth of the institute.

IGIDR also has a full-fledged Masters of Science programme which draws applicants from all over India. This programme normally has over 60 participants at a time.

== Management ==
Dr. Kirit S. Parikh was the first director of the institute.

Dr. Basanta Kumar Pradhan is the current director of the institute. There were 26 full-time faculty members, 25 non-academic staff, 60 M.Phil/Ph.D. students and 80 M.Sc. Economics students.

- Sanjay Malhotra, Chairman
- Prof. Basanta Kumar Pradhan, Director (Vice Chancellor)
- Dr. Michael D. Patra, Member
- Shri. T. Rabi Shanker, Member
- Prof. Sandip Trivedi, Member
- Prof. Ravindra H. Dholakia, Member
- Dr. Shubhro Sarkar, Member
- A. Ganesh Kumar, Member
- G. Mythili, Member
- Shri Saurabh Bhargava, Member
- Dr. Satya Narayan Mohanty, Member
- Jai Mohan Pandit, Registrar

== Vision and values ==
The aims and objectives of the institute are to promote and conduct research on developmental issues from a broad inter- disciplinary perspective (economic, technological, social, political and ecological). It aspires to gain insights into the process of development and alternative policy options and to further disseminate the knowledge acquired.

The primary objectives of the institute are :

- To promote and conduct research on development from a broad inter-disciplinary perspective.
- To promote co-operative endeavour and interaction between research scholars and institutions in India and abroad.
- To undertake projects or activity which renders itself useful for the furtherance of development and social welfare.
- To carry out training for advanced degrees viz. Master's and Doctorate award.

Special emphasis will be laid on the following areas:

- The comparative study of development and policy in different regions and countries.
- The growing interdependence among nations in the world economy and its impact on development strategies and policy options.
- The influence of international trading, financial and economic systems on countries.
- The examination of energy, technology and environment problems in global setting.
- The analytical foundations of the positions adopted by India and other developing countries in international forums and negotiations.
- Economic and technological cooperation among developing countries and India's development experience and policies.
- Planning techniques and methodology.
- Issues in the choice of technology and social well-being.
- The role of innovation and diffusion of technology in development.
- Resource utilisation and environment implications of technological alternatives.
- Social, legal, organisational and institutional aspects of development.
- The Institute shall also serve as a centre for promoting co-operative endeavour and interaction in research activities between Indian scholars and institutions as well as between Indian and foreign scholars and institutions

== Campus ==
The institute is located on a 14-acre (57,000 m^{2}) site on a hillside in Goregaon (East), 15 minutes by public bus from Mumbai's suburban Goregaon railway station and 20 minutes drive from Mumbai's national and international airports. The campus, whose architecture is inspired by the art in the Elephanta and Jogeshwari caves, includes office buildings for research and administrative staff, several seminar rooms, a 500-seat auditorium, a library, a computer centre, a cafeteria and a guest house where visiting scholars are accommodated.

The students and staff of the institute are provided accommodation on campus. There are also some recreational facilities which include a 20-metre swimming pool, a tennis court, an indoor badminton court, a table tennis room, a small jogging track, a fully equipped gym and a children's park at the institute.

The institute also has an Alumni Association, which conducts an annual meet in the month of March.

== Programs offered ==
=== M.Sc. in Economics ===
The Masters in Economics is a two-year programme, which provides students with rigorous hands-on training in Economics, special emphasis on analytical and problem solving skills, and exposure to emerging national and international policy issues. Students have an option for a Master's thesis in their 4th semester

=== Ph.D. ===
The Ph.D. programme is designed to create academic researchers as well as professionals who are capable of conducting policy analysis, relating to national and global economic and development issues, from a quantitative and inter-disciplinary perspective. While an interdisciplinary approach is encouraged, the programme lays somewhat larger emphasis on economics to provide an integrated framework within which various development issues can be addressed. Ph.D. students are expected to submit their dissertations within four years of joining the institute. Ph.D. programmes involve successful completion of course work as well as submission of a dissertation.

=== Visiting Scholars Programme ===
There is a programme for visiting scholars which is part of the institute's outreach to other colleges and universities in India. The programme's scholarships enable up to five selected scholars to spend three months at a stretch at IGIDR to work on a research proposal that can be satisfactorily completed during their stay.

=== Post-Doctoral Fellowship ===
The Post-Doctoral Fellowship (PDF) Programme has been instituted in IGIDR as part of its outreach activities. Its objective is to support high quality research by scholars with a doctoral degree and an outstanding academic record. Up to three fellowships are available per year. The fellowships are granted for an initial period of one year, which can be extended by a maximum of one more year.
