= Mary Scholes =

South African environmental scientist

Mary Catherine Scholes
- Born: Mary Catherine Scholes; South Africa
- Education: University of the Witwatersrand
- Known for: Research in climate change, soil fertility, food security, and biogeochemistry
- Spouse: Bob Scholes
- Children: 1
- Awards: Fellow of the Royal Society of South Africa; Fellow of the South African Academy of Science; Fellow of the African Academy of Sciences; Fellow of The World Academy of Sciences; Foreign Member of the Royal Swedish Academy of Agriculture and Forestry
- Scientific career
- Fields: Environmental science, systems analysis, climate change, soil science, food security
- Workplaces: University of the Witwatersrand

Mary Catherine Scholes is a South African environmental scientist and professor known for her work in systems analysis, climate change, soil science, and food security. She is a professor in the School of Animal, Plant and Environmental Sciences at the University of the Witwatersrand.

== Early life and education ==
Scholes obtained her Bachelor of Science, Bachelor of Science (Honours), and PhD degrees from the University of the Witwatersrand.

== Career and research ==
Scholes is a full professor at the University of the Witwatersrand, where she holds a research chair in systems analysis and global change. Her research focuses on soil fertility, food security, and biogeochemistry across ecosystems such as savannas, forests, and agricultural lands.

She has contributed to research on climate change, including the environmental and health impacts of industrial activities and energy production.

Her work also involves monitoring water pollution, forestry systems, and the interaction between ecological and social systems in environmental management.

== Academic leadership and affiliations ==
Scholes has held several leadership roles in international scientific organizations. She has served as vice-chairperson of international initiatives on climate change, agriculture, and food security, and has been involved with global environmental research networks.

She has also contributed to scientific advisory boards and international research collaborations, including work with institutions such as the Max Planck Institute for Chemistry.

== Honors and awards ==
Scholes is a fellow of several prestigious scientific academies, including:

- The Royal Society of South Africa
- The South African Academy of Science
- The African Academy of Sciences
- The World Academy of Sciences

She has also been elected as a foreign member of the Royal Swedish Academy of Agriculture and Forestry.

In 2018, she was elected a Fellow of the African Academy of Sciences in recognition of her contributions to biosciences.

== Teaching and mentorship ==
Scholes has supervised and mentored more than 70 postgraduate students and has received awards for teaching, research, and academic citizenship at the University of the Witwatersrand.

== Personal life ==
She is married to systems ecologist Bob Scholes, and they have a son.
