= Canadian Health Network =

The Canadian Health Network (CHN) was established in 1999 as a national, bilingual health promotion service operated by the Public Health Agency of Canada and major health organizations across Canada. It was an on-line collaborative service and includes health information providers such as national and provincial/territorial non-profit organizations, as well as universities, hospitals, libraries and community organizations.

The CHN offered dependable, up-to-date information on health promotion and disease and injury prevention, to help individuals and communities make healthy choices that improve the quality of their life. It was known to be of the most comprehensive networks of its kind in the world. It was a called a 'network' since the information was amalgamated from a variety of Canadian health organizations.

In November 2007, the Public Health Agency of Canada announced that the service would end, and on April 1, 2008, the website was replaced with a redirect notice.
