= Jeonju Airport =

Coordinates: 35°52′42″N 127°07′10″E

- IATA: CHN; ICAO: RKJU

Summary
- Airport type: Military/Public
- Owner/Operator: Republic of Korea Army
- Serves: Jeonju, South Korea
- Elevation AMSL: 96 ft (29 m)
- Interactive map of Jeonju Airport

Runways
Direction	Length		Surface
Direction	ft	m	Surface
07/25	4,800	1,463	Asphalt
- Source: DAFIF

Jeonju Airport (IATA: CHN, ICAO: RKJU) is a small military airport located near Jeonju (Chonju), South Korea. Before, it used to serve civilian transport aircraft.
