= Kirit Parikh =

Indian economist

Kirit S. Parikh is emeritus Professor (on retirement as Director) and Founder Director of Indira Gandhi Institute of Development Research (IGIDR), Mumbai, India. He has also served as Senior Economic Advisor to United Nations Development Programme from October 1997 to September 1998. He has been a member of the Economic Advisory Council (EAC) for multiple Prime Ministers of India: Rajiv Gandhi, V.P.Singh, Chandra Shekhar, P.V. Narasimha Rao and Atal Bihari Vajpayee.

Parikh is a Gujarati. He completed his B.E. in Civil Engineering from Gujarat University, India in 1956. In 1957 he did his M.Tech. (Structures) from Indian Institute of Technology Kharagpur. He has a D.Sc. in civil engineering and a master's degree in economics from MIT, USA. He is also a Fellow of the National Academy of Sciences, India. He has been the editor of "India Development Reports" which provide a non-governmental assessment of India's development and policy options. Apart from these, he has been a member of numerous other boards of directors. He has also authored and co-authored more than 15 books in the areas of planning, water resource management, appropriate technology for housing, optimum requirement for fertilizers, energy systems, national and international food policies, trade policies, general equilibrium modeling and natural resources accounting. He has also published numerous articles. The Government of India awarded him the third highest civilian honour of the Padma Bhushan, in 2009, for his contributions to public affairs.
