= Genevieve Guenther =

American author and climate activist

Genevieve Juliette Guenther
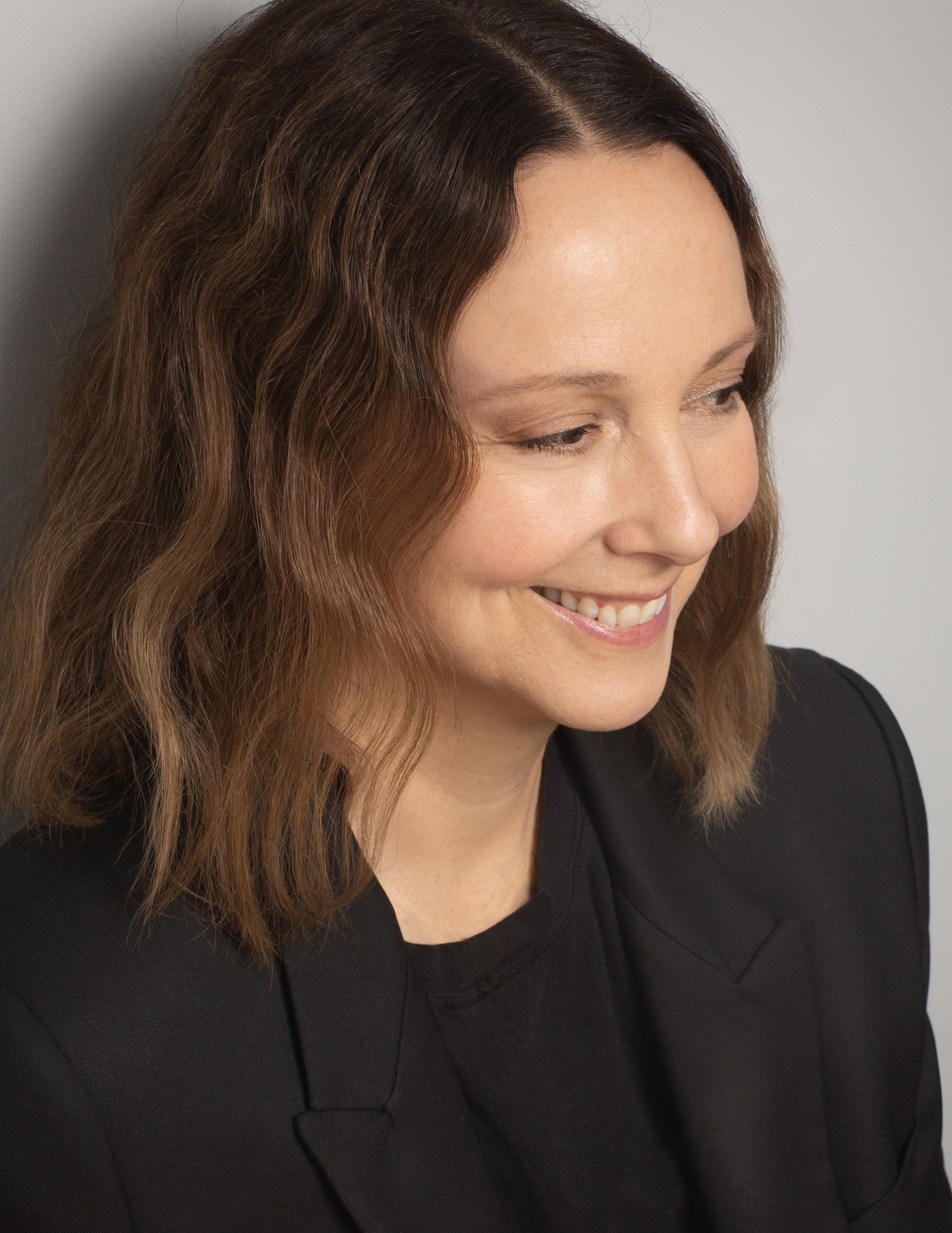
- Education: Columbia University; University of California, Berkeley (PhD)
- Organization(s): End Climate Silence; The New School
- Website: https://www.genevieveguenther.com/

Genevieve Juliette Guenther is an American climate change activist, consultant, author, and speaker. A former Renaissance scholar, she is the founding director of the media watchdog organization End Climate Silence. She is currently affiliate faculty at the Tishman Environment and Design Center at The New School.

Oxford University Press published her climate book The Language of Climate Politics: Fossil Fuel Propaganda and How to Fight It. The book debunks the new climate denial, threaded into science, economics, and geopolitics, that says we can keep using coal, oil, and methane gas and still halt global heating anyway. The book offers practical tips and clear, actionable messages to counter this denial.

== Early life and education ==
Guenther received her bachelor's degree from Columbia University and her Ph.D. from the University of California, Berkeley, in 2004, in Renaissance literature. She is the daughter of actress and 1952 Miss Denmark Greta Thyssen and Theodore Gunther. She was married to Neal Cardwell in 2007.

== Career ==
=== Literature ===
Guenther started her career as a tenure-track English professor at the University of Rochester. Her book on English Literature, Magical Imaginations: Instrumental Aesthetics in the English Renaissance, analyzes works by Spenser, Marlowe, and Shakespeare.

=== Climate-related work ===
Guenther consults with advocacy organizations, climate-conscious businesses, and Democratic elected officials, advising them on navigating climate disinformation and increasing support for climate policies and initiatives.

Guenther speaks regularly on the dangers of fossil fuel propaganda, the myths of climate economics, the future of climate politics and clean-energy development, climate policy in China, and solutions for climate communication. Venues have included the United Nations, Fortune 500 companies, climate NGOs and clean energy industry associations, and US and UK universities including Duke, Columbia, and Harvard.

In addition, Guenther writes scholarly and popular articles about the language of climate politics, media coverage of climate change, and the cultural aspects of the climate crisis, drawing on sociology, psychology, philosophy, and literary theory to update outmoded paradigms for climate communication (see Bibliography below for examples).

She writes a weekly newsletter about the language of climate politics and the news media, where she recommends effective climate talking-points and climate actions to help counter that disinformation.

She is the founding director of the volunteer organization End Climate Silence, which advocates for increased coverage of climate change in news media, and has been cited as an "incredibly effective advocate for persuading journalists to include the climate emergency in their stories." The group's advisory board is Brad Johnson, Michael Mann, Peter Kalmus, and Margaret Klein Salamon.

Guenther has been noted especially for her media activism and for her book, The Language of Climate Politics: Fossil Fuel Propaganda and How to Fight It, published by Oxford University Press in July 2024. The climate journalist and activist Bill McKibben called the book "a gift to the world." In a starred review, Publishers Weekly called the book a "revelatory study." The Los Angeles Review of Books called the book a "manifesto and de facto minicourse in critical thinking, an often uncanny hybrid that nevertheless equips and empowers climate communicators to expose fallacies and disinformation in fossil-fuel interests' rhetoric."

Guenther was an Expert Reviewer of the IPCC Sixth Assessment Report.

=== Media appearances ===
Guenther has been interviewed by a number of media outlets. In 2018 she appeared on the CNN show Reliable Sources. In 2019 she was interviewed by Brian Lehrer on "The Brian Lehrer Show," on WNYC public radio. In October 2020 her work was profiled in The New Yorker. In 2021 Guenther was interviewed on a climate-focused episode of The New York Times podcast, "The Argument." On her 2024 book tour, she was interviewed at The United Nations by Eric Roston of Bloomberg, and David Wallace-Wells of The New York Times.

== Bibliography ==
=== Books ===
- The Language of Climate Politics: Fossil-Fuel Propaganda and How to Fight It (2024) ISBN 0197642233
- Magical Imaginations: Instrumental Aesthetics in the English Renaissance (2012) ISBN 978-1442642416

=== Selected Essays ===
- — (2024-06-24). "The New Climate Denial Is Based on These Six Terms" The New Republic. Retrieved 2024-08-04.
- — (2023-12-19). "The Secret Weapon of Climate Negotiations: Language" The New Republic. Retrieved 2024-08-04.
- — (2023-03-22). "The New UN Climate Report Airs the Dirty Truth about Fossil Fuels" MSNBC. Retrieved 2024-08-04.
- — (July 1, 2022). "The Practice of Anger in a Warming World". The Kenyon Review.
- — (2022-04-19). "We Need to Talk About the Carbon Footprints of the Rich" Noema Magazine. Retrieved 2024-08-04. (Winner, Best Commentary Award, 65th SoCal Journalism Awards, 2022)
- — (April 4, 2022). "Carbon Removal Isn't the Solution to Climate Change". The New Republic.
- — (October 18, 2021). "Fossil Fuel Branded Content Is a Form of Climate Denial and Propaganda". Teen Vogue.
- — (December 11, 2020). Claude Henry; Johan Rockström; Sir Nicholas Stern (eds.). "Communicating the Climate Emergency: Imagination, Emotion, Action". Standing up for a Sustainable World. Edward Elgar: 401–408. doi:10.4337/9781800371781.00071. ISBN 978-1-80037-178-1. S2CID 234932267.
- Guenther, Genevieve Juliette (September 10, 2020). "Americans Want Climate Change News. Media Should Give it to Them". The Boston Globe.
- — (December 19, 2019). "What Climate Change Tells Us about Being Human". Scientific American.
- — (October 10, 2018). "Who is the 'We' in 'We are Causing Climate Change'?". Slate.
