= UK Health Alliance on Climate Change =

UK organisation of health institutions

- Formation: 2016
- Purpose: Climate change mitigation to improve public health
- Headquarters: BMJ Publishing Group, Tavistock Square
- Region served: UK
- Fields: Healthcare
- Members: Over 650,000 people (2020)
- Co-Chairs of the Alliance: Hugh Montgomery and Sandy Mather
- Director: Elaine Mulcahy
- Website: ukhealthalliance.org

The UK Health Alliance on Climate Change (UKHACC), also referred to as the Alliance, is an organisation in the United Kingdom of several major health institutions that give it a collective membership of over 650,000 people including doctors, nurses and other healthcare professionals, with the aim to better public health by combatting climate change. It was founded in 2016 and its founding members include the British Medical Journal (BMJ), the British Medical Association (BMA), The Lancet, the Royal Society of Medicine (RSM) and the Royal College of Physicians (RCP).

Its activities have included producing reports pertinent to air pollution, coal phase-out and carbon footprints. "A Breath of Fresh Air" (2016), proposes a series of actions to clean up the air and tackle climate change, and "All-Consuming: Building a Healthier Food System for People & Planet" (2020), makes a series of recommendations, including calling for campaigns to inform the public on diet and putting labels on food to show what impact that food has on the environment.

Since 2025, the Alliance has been chaired by Hugh Montgomery and Sandy Mather.

== Origin ==
The UK Health Alliance on Climate Change (UKHACC), also referred to as the "Alliance", is an organization in the UK of several major health institutions that collectively aim to promote public health by combatting climate change. It was formed in 2016 to lead the health profession's response to climate change in the United Kingdom, and is an effort to encourage healthcare professionals as campaigners for health and climate.

Its founding members include the British Medical Journal (BMJ), the British Medical Association (BMA), The Lancet, the Royal Society of Medicine and the Royal College of Physicians (RCP).

== Purpose ==
Its purpose is to protect and promote public health by recruiting doctors, nurses and other healthcare professionals to advocate for better responses to climate change.

== Organisation ==
It is a member of the Global Climate and Health Alliance, which formed in 2011. Other similar organisations include Physicians for Social Responsibility, the American Public Health Association, Australia's Climate and Health Alliance, the US Climate and Health Alliance, the Canadian Association of Physicians for the Environment (CAPE), and the Alliance of Nurses for Healthy Environments (ANHE), collectively with a significant proportion of their national medical workforce.

In 2025, Hugh Montgomery and Sandy Mather became co-chairs of the Alliance, following on from former editor-in-chief of the BMJ, Richard Smith, who in turn took over from Linda Luxon. Its director is Elaine Mulcahy.

Smith wrote in 2020 that "health professionals have global networks, and mitigating climate change demands global action". As of 2020 its affiliated associations collectively cover over 650,000 people.

== Activities ==
In 2016, building upon "Every Breath We Take", a document published by the Royal College of Physicians and Royal College of Paediatrics and Child Health, which attributed 40,000 premature deaths per year to polluted outdoor air, the Alliance published its first report, "A Breath of Fresh Air". The report proposed a series of actions to clean up the air and tackle climate change. It considers how methods that use collaboration can deal with climate change challenges, particularly for cutting carbon dioxide and improving air quality, by coal phase-out. In a letter to then Health Secretary Jeremy Hunt, the Alliance highlighted threats of extreme weather events and the need for preparedness.

In 2017 the Alliance collaborated with King's College London to show that polluted air covered more than 50% of NHS facilities in London.

In June 2019 the Alliance was one of several concerned environmental organisations to write to the then Prime Minister, Theresa May, urging her to urgently commit to the recommendation of the independent Committee on Climate Change for the UK to set a target for net-zero greenhouse gas emissions before 2050. In June 2019, the Prime Minister responded by confirming that a 2050 target would be set in law, the legislation being passed later that month.

In early 2020 the Alliance supported Sir Simon Stevens' announcement that the NHS would aim for "net zero", call on hospitals to reduce carbon from their premises, switch to better asthma inhalers and encourage staff to take more active travel. Later in the year, its report "All-Consuming: Building a Healthier Food System for People & Planet" (2020) makes a series of recommendations, including calling for campaigns to inform the public on diet, relaying messages relating to climate and putting labels on food to show what impact that food has on the environment. It calls for a food carbon tax on all food producers calculated according to the carbon footprint of their products.

== Members ==
Members of the UK Health Alliance on Climate Change include more than 20 institutions including royal colleges and medical journals. Its members include the Climate and Health Council, and as listed on the Alliance's official website, members include:

- British Medical Association
- Faculty of Public Health
- Faculty of Sexual & Reproductive Healthcare
- Royal College of Anaesthetists
- Royal College of Emergency Medicine
- Royal College of General Practitioners
- Royal College of Nursing
- Royal College of Obstetricians and Gynaecologists
- Royal College of Paediatrics and Child Health
- Royal College of Physicians
- Royal College of Psychiatrists
- Royal College of Surgeons
- Royal Society of Medicine
- Royal College of Veterinary Surgeons
- The British Medical Journal
- The Lancet
