= Ying Sun (environmental scientist) =

Chinese-American agricultural and environmental scientist

Ying Sun is a Chinese-American agricultural scientist and environmental scientist whose research combines space-based sensing and land surface modeling to study the interactions between climate and agricultural ecosystems. She is an associate professor in the School of Integrative Plant Science Soil and Crop Sciences at Cornell University.

Sun is originally from Yangquan. She is a 2008 graduate of Beijing Normal University, and completed a doctorate at the University of Texas at Austin in 2013. Her doctoral dissertation, Role of Mesophyll CO_{2} Diffusion and Large-Scale Disturbances in the Interactions between Climate and Carbon Cycles, was supervised by Robert E. Dickinson. She was a postdoctoral researcher, jointly between the University of Texas and with Christian Frankenberg at the Jet Propulsion Laboratory, before taking her present faculty position at Cornell in 2016.

In 2024, Sun's research group developed a remote sensing method to assess and predict crop yield by measuring the solar-induced chlorophyll fluorescence (SIF). This approach using satellite data is cost-effective and has the potential to inform policy making, crop insurance, and poverty forecasting. Another study used a machine learning algorithm that is used to effectively reduce noise and artifacts in a satellite data product, solar-induced fluorescence (SIF) from chlorophyll.
