= Climate Heritage Network =

The Climate Heritage Network (CHN) was set up in 2018 and launched in 2019 in response to the Global Climate Action Summit and the impacts of climate change on the arts, culture and heritage sectors. It aims to support its members in contributing to the fulfilment of the Paris Climate Agreement through the inclusion of culture. The network also aims to introduce cultural heritage into discussions about climate change.

The global network consists of over 250 non-governmental organizations, government agencies, universities, businesses and other organizations working with culture in its various forms.

In September 2022, the CHN released an Action Plan that specifically defines two goals for 2022-24: "Increase the quantity and quality of culture-based climate action" and "Transform climate policy". To support these goals, the CHN names 12 key issues, such as Buildings and Infrastructure, Food and Agriculture, Waste and Consumption.

To this end, the network is also increasingly present at international climate conferences, such as the 26th UN Climate Change Conference (COP26) in Glasgow, Scotland and the 27th UN Climate Change Conference (COP27) in Sharm El-Sheikh, Egypt.
