= Ambassador Award =

The Ambassador Award is one of the most prestigious union-level awards of the American Geophysical Union (AGU) and recognizes individuals whose excellence and leadership in research, education, and innovation have significantly advanced Earth and space science. The Ambassador Award recognizes the value of AGU members’ outstanding contributions that benefit society above and beyond their own research.

The award was established by the AGU in 2013 to recognize the groundbreaking contributions of individuals whose achievements extend beyond the scope of traditional scientific honors. The award is annually given to between one and five individuals with notable achievements in societal impact, service to the Earth and space communities, scientific leadership, and promotion of the talent and career pool.

The Ambassador Award is the only union-level award of the AGU whose recipients are automatically made AGU Fellows.

The Ambassador Award was approved by the AGU Board of Directors on September 20, 2013, as a step forward by the AGU in building the community of scientists whose dedication to reaching across boundaries has made science visible and compelling, empowered new voices, and inspired future generations of researchers.

== Past recipients ==
The following list is based on the information provided by the AGU.

Year	Recipients
2025	Ken Buesseler, James Crawford, Carol Finn, Dalal Najib, F Martin Ralph
2024	Newsha Khodatalab Ajami, Dennis Baldocchi, Minhan Dai, Veronika Eyring, Jessica Lundquist
2023	Jose D. Fuentes, Nick Van De Giesen, Jill Karsten, Rosemary Knight, Carlos Afonso Nobre
2022	Katharine Hayhoe, Toshio Koike, Marino Protti, Roger S Pulwarty, Mary A Voytek
2021	Fatima Abrantes, Madhulika Guhathakurta, Susan Joy Hassol, Ambrose Jearld Jr., Aradhna Tripati
2020	Karletta Chief, Kaveh Madani, Martha E. Maiden, Erika Marin-Spiotta, Gerald R. North
2019	Alik Ismail-Zadeh, Lixin Wu, Margaret Leinen, Constance Millar, Sunanda Basu
2018	Rosaly M. C. Lopes, Christopher M. Reddy, Esteban G. Jobbágy
2017	Jean M. Bahr, Robert A. Duce, Richard C.J. Somerville
2016	Ashanti Johnson, Anne S. Meltzer, Naomi Oreskes, M. Susan Lozier
2015	Lucile Jones, Charles R. Chappell, Gordon McBean
2014	Ghassem Asrar, James Overland, Scott Mandia, Paul Hsieh, Michael Wysession

== See also ==
- American Geophysical Union
