= Sierra Nevada subalpine zone =

Biotic zone in California, United States

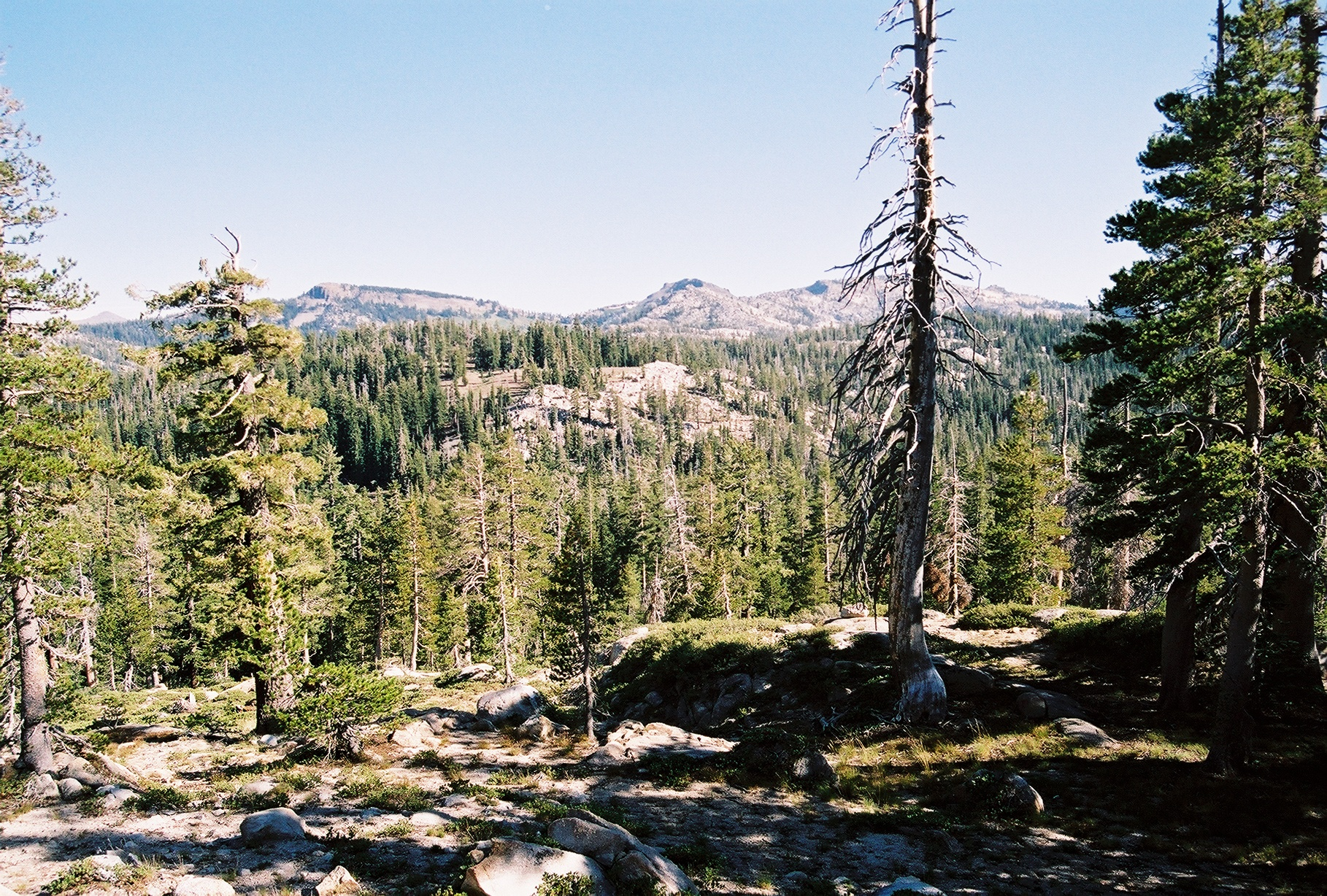
Typical subalpine woodland stand in the Sierra Nevada

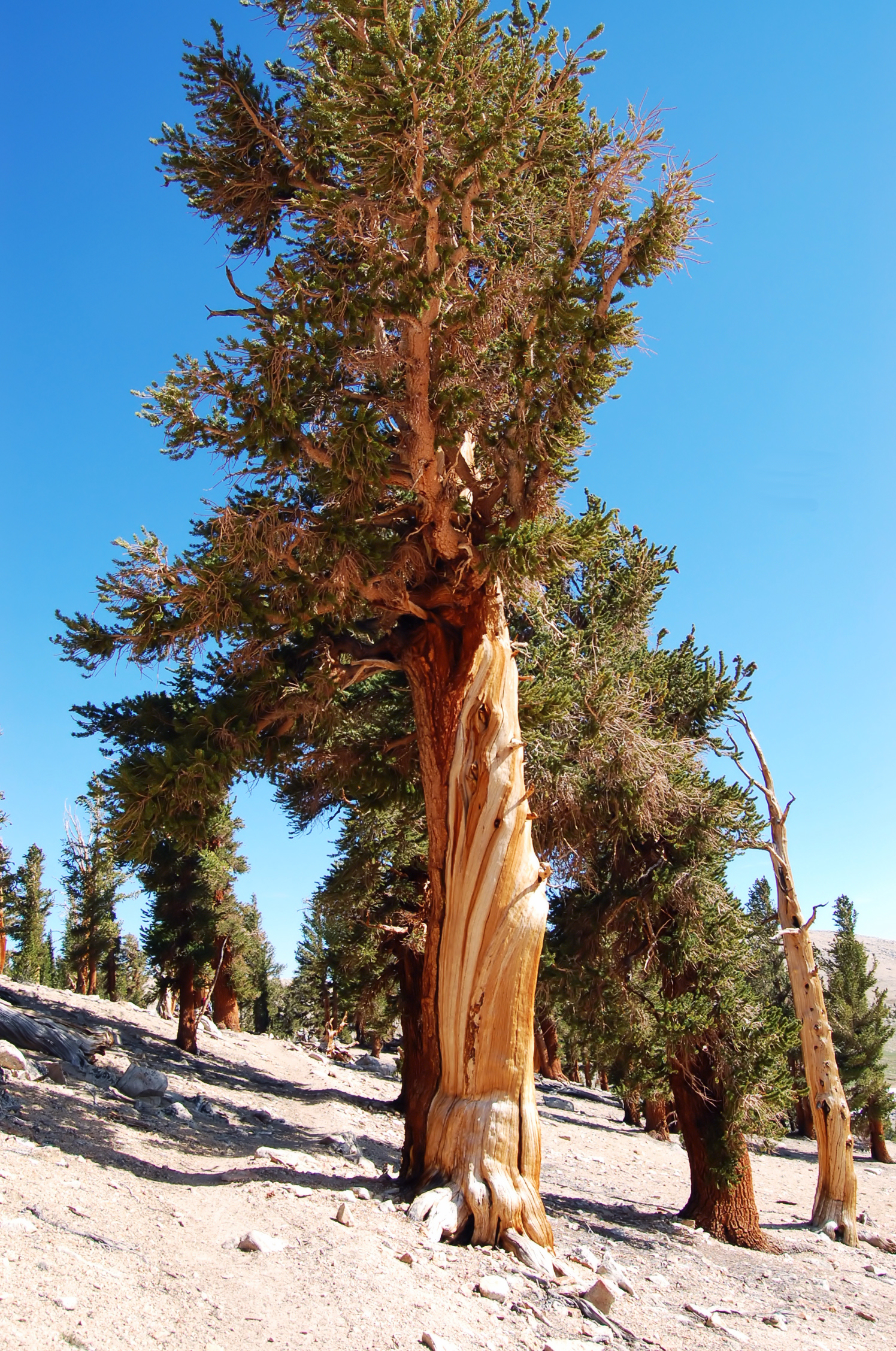
A foxtail pine at 3,450 metres (11,320 ft) in Sequoia National Park.

The Sierra Nevada subalpine zone refers to a biotic zone below the tree line in the Sierra Nevada mountain range of California, United States. This subalpine zone is positioned between the upper montane zone (such as red fir forest) at its lower limit, and tree line at its upper limit.

The Sierra Nevada subalpine zone occurs between 2,450–3,660 metres (8,000–12,000 ft), and is characterized by an open woodland of several conifer species, including whitebark pine, lodgepole pine, western white pine, mountain hemlock, and Sierra juniper. The vegetation and ecology is determined by the harsh climate, with extensive snow and wind. In addition, soils are thin and nutrient-poor. Due to these harsh conditions, vegetation grows slowly and to reduced heights. In addition, the stressful environment suppress species competition and promotes mutualism.

The marginal conditions make the Sierra Nevada subalpine zone sensitive to environmental changes, such as climate change and pollution. The long-lived nature of the subalpine species make the zone a good study system to examine these effects.

== Location ==
The subalpine zone of the Sierra Nevada occurs between 2,900–3,660 metres (9,500–12,000 ft) in the southern part of the range and 2,450–3,100 metres (8,000–10,200 ft) in the north. Because the Sierra is higher in the south, the majority of subalpine occurs in the central and southern portions of the range, south of the Lake Tahoe basin. A few isolated patches occur in the north on mountain peaks higher than 2,400 metres (7,900 ft).

== Climate and physical factors ==
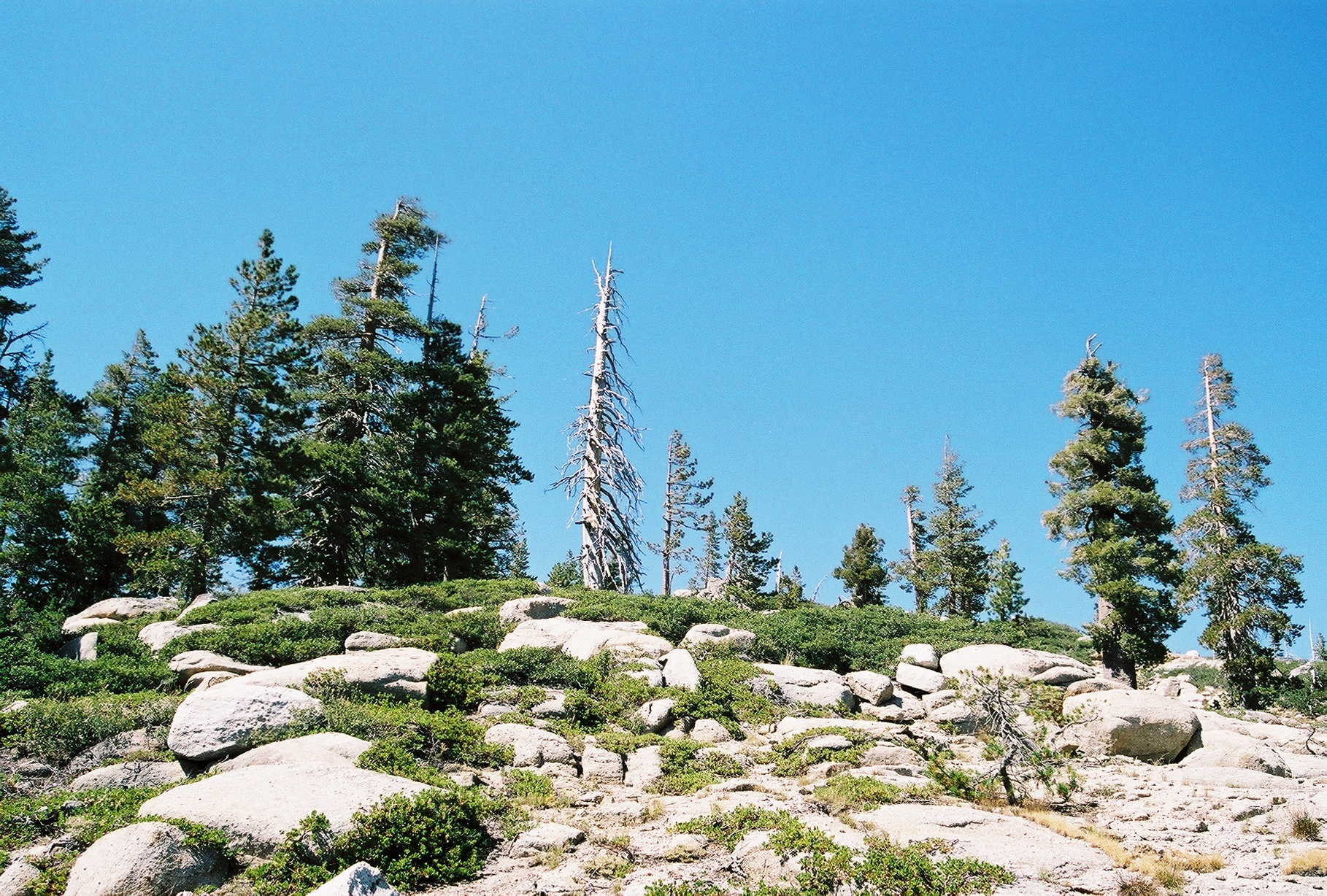
South-facing slope in subalpine zone

The climate of subalpine ecosystems is dominated by very long winters and short growing seasons of 6–9 weeks. Temperatures are cool even during the growing season and frost can occur 12 months of the year. Precipitation ranges from 750–1,250 millimetres (30–50 in) per year, which falls mostly as snow during the winter. Temperatures average −11.5 to 1.5 °C (11 to 35 °F) in January and 5.5 to 19.5 °C (42 to 67 °F) in July, with a mean annual temperature around 4 °C (39 °F). Snow depths often exceed 3 metres (10 ft), but average 2 metres (7 ft) by the end of March.

Winds can be high throughout the year and are a major factor limiting plant growth near the upper limit of the subalpine zone (tree line). Wind limits vegetative growth chiefly in two ways: by physically battering plants, including blowing snow and ice, and by increasing evapotranspiration in an environment that is already water-stressed.

Soils are thin, coarse and relatively nutrient-poor, owing to the unproductive climate and repeated glaciation events during the Pleistocene. Moisture retention is usually high, due to the presence of underlying granite bedrock, and soils often become waterlogged early in the growing season. However, because very little precipitation falls during the summer months, soils can dry quickly once snow melts and vegetative growth and reproduction is limited late in the growing season by drought.

Compared to subalpine zones in the Cascade Range, Sierran subalpine experiences less annual precipitation, with a longer drought period during the summer months, but similar temperature ranges throughout the year. Compared to Rocky Mountains subalpine zone, Sierran subalpine experiences a narrower (more mild) range of temperatures and higher annual precipitation, with more winter snow and less summer rain.

== Vegetation ==
=== Physiognomy ===
Generally, Sierran subalpine is dominated by woodland, which means the canopy cover averages between 30 and 60% closure (>60 % closure is considered forest). However, some species, particularly in protected sites with deeper soils and reduced wind, form closed-canopy stands. Growth form of trees is also variable; single-stemmed, large individuals are more abundant at lower elevations and protected sites, while multi-stemmed, stunted (krummholz-form) individuals are more abundant near tree line. Herb and shrub-dominated communities also occur, but comprise a small proportion of the total land area within the subalpine zone. Meadows can occur where water is more available.

=== Composition ===
Shrubs and herbs are usually sparse, but can be common in stands where snow melts earlier in the growing season. Diversity of herbs in the subalpine zone is usually less than lower-elevation zones such as upper and lower montane. Broad classifications of herb and shrub communities can be found in Sawyer and Keeler-Wolf. For a fine-scale classification of subalpine meadow communities, see Benedict.

The composition of tree species within Sierran subalpine is variable with comparatively high diversity for subalpine. Subalpine stands in the Rocky Mountains, for example, are usually dominated by a single tree species. Stands in the Sierra may be mixed, with up to five species present, or pure, monospecific stands, depending on the range of the species and microsite conditions.

Whitebark pine (Pinus albicauls) is possibly the most widespread component of subalpine woodland in the central and northern regions of the Sierra. This species is found at higher elevations than all other species in this region, forming dense monospecific stands of krummholz near the tree line and near ridgetops. At lower elevations, whitebark pine can co-occur with lodgepole pine, Sierra juniper (Juniperus occidentalis ssp. australis) and mountain hemlock (Tsuga mertensiana).

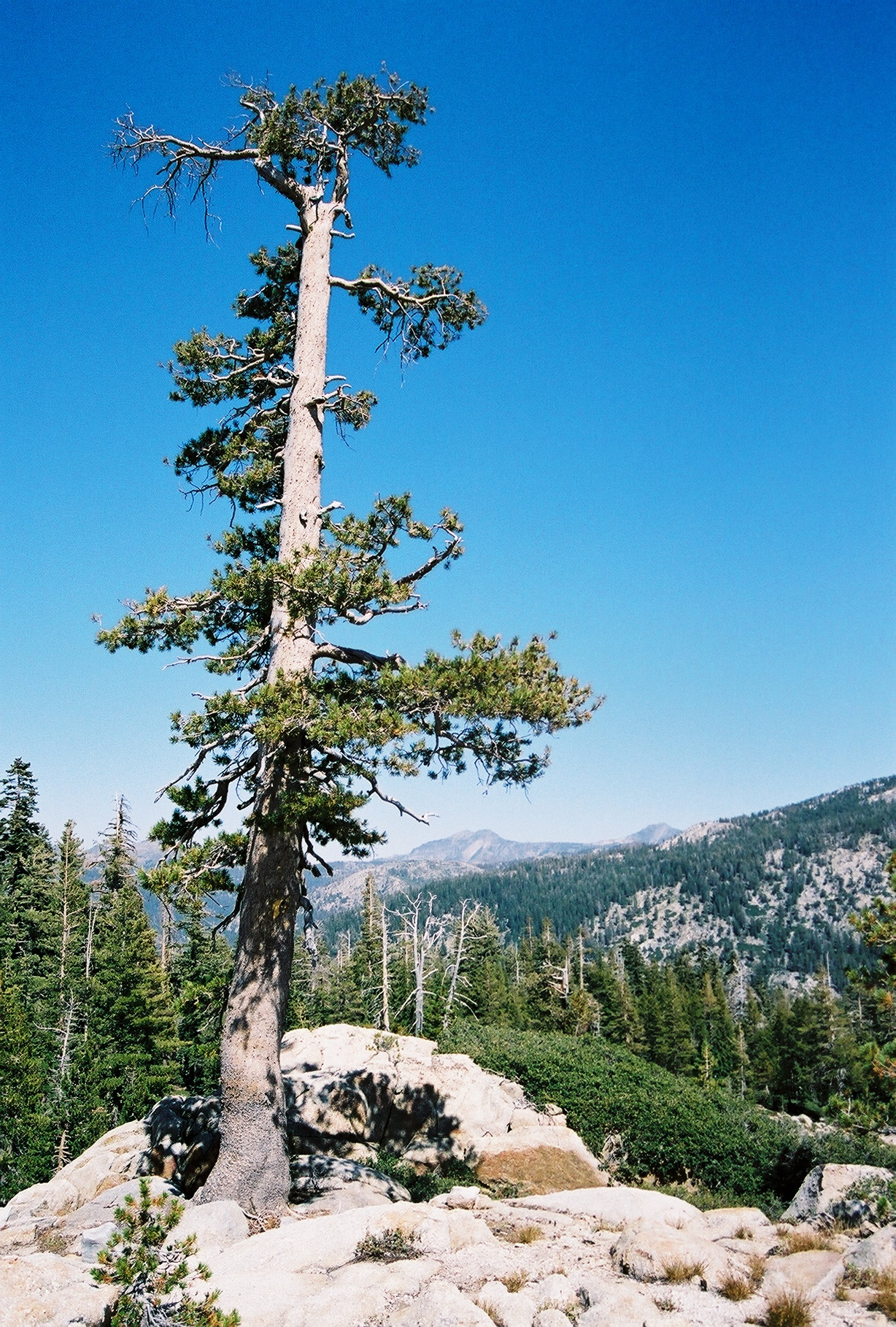
Lodgepole pine growing on granite outcrop.

Lodgepole pine (Pinus contorta ssp. murrayana), which occurs in vast stands in the upper montane zone, is found mostly in mixed stands in subalpine woodland, particularly with whitebark pine. Lodgepole is not usually found near tree line, although it does occasionally form krummholz.

Western white pine (Pinus monticola) can be found in pure stands, especially on exposed slopes, where snowpack is shorter-lived. More commonly however, western white pine grows in mixed stands with lodgepole, mountain hemlock, Jeffrey pine (Pinus jeffreyi) and/or red fir (Abies magnifica)

Mountain hemlock may be the most common tree species in the subalpine zone, especially in the central and northern Sierra. This species forms dense, pure stands on protected slopes with moist soil, but can also co-occur with Sierra juniper and whitebark pine. Mountain hemlock often exhibits two growth forms on the same individual, with one stem upright and several branches at the base extending out along the ground. It forms a hedge-like growth form near tree line.

Sierra juniper is sparse in subalpine, occurring strictly on exposed, rocky slopes, usually among granite boulders. Limber pine (Pinus flexilis) occurs in pure stands on nutrient-poor, often steep slopes along the east side of the Sierra, and forms mat-like krummholz growth forms at tree line. Foxtail pine (Pinus balfouriana) grows on shallow soils on exposed slopes in mixed stands at lower elevations and pure stands close to tree line. This species does not form krummholz and can be found as single-stemmed trees even at very high elevations. Foxtail pine is restricted to the southern part of the Sierra, forming pure stands where whitebark pine would dominate further north.

In addition to the species described above, Jeffrey pine and red fir, which are more commonly found in the upper montane zone, can be found at low abundances in the subalpine zone, particularly on exposed slopes where snow does not linger as long.

=== Adaptations to stressful conditions ===
The growth form and physiology of subalpine plants is reflective of the stressful environment to which they are adapted. Leaves are very long-lived at this elevation because they are costly to produce and soils are usually nutrient-poor. Since plants ultimately take nutrients such as nitrogen from the soil to produce organs such as leaves, this adaptation provides them an advantage in subalpine soils because their nutrient retention is enhanced. Also, evergreen plants can carry out photosynthesis on periodic warm days during the winter, which is an advantage in a climate with a very short growing season.

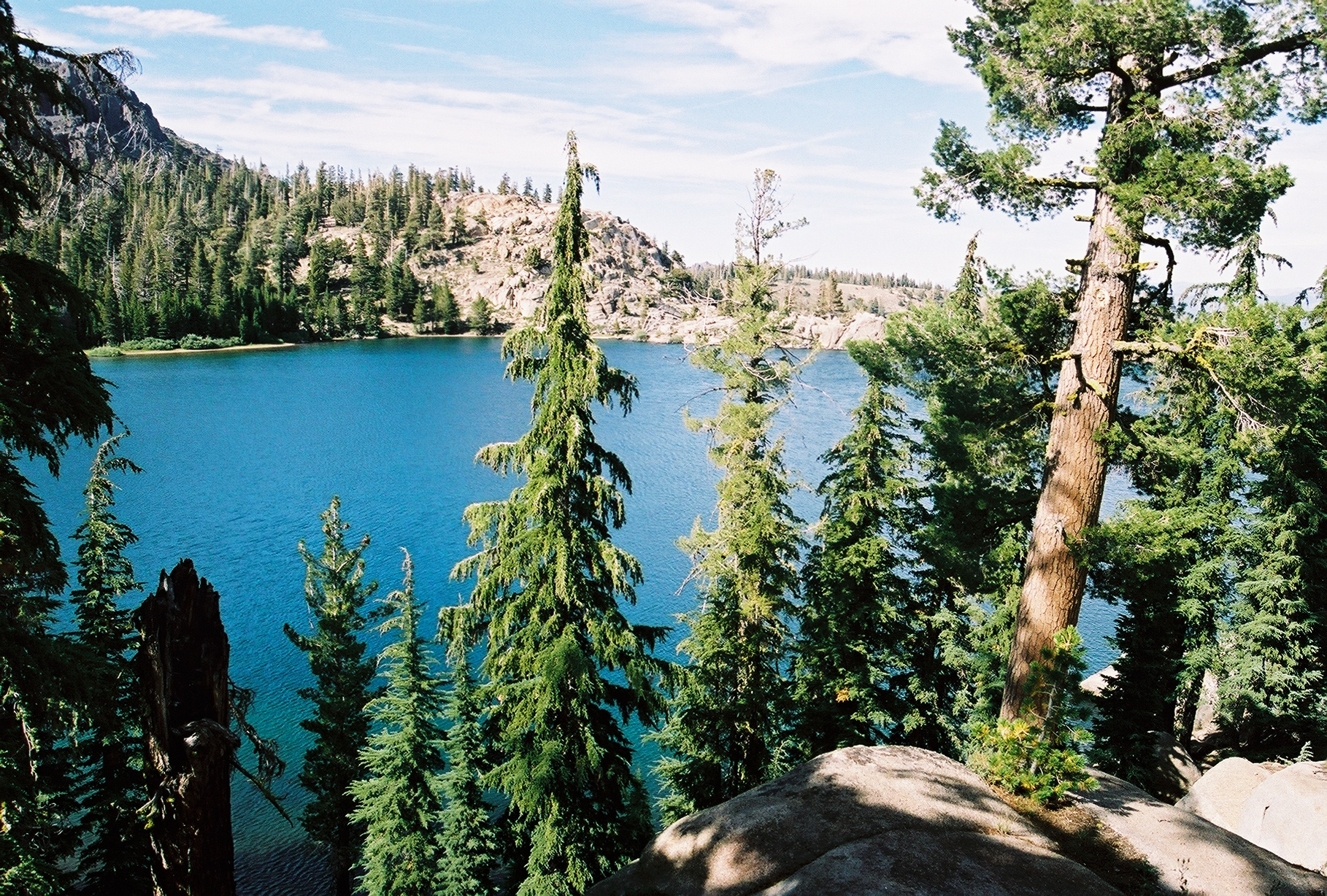
Mountain hemlock on lake near Ebbetts Pass.

Most perennial herbs in subalpine ecosystems have very high root to shoot ratios, or large underground rhizomes, which allow them to store carbohydrates underground during the winter and grow very fast during the short growing season. Shrubs tend to be prostrate and low to the ground. This morphology is advantageous because temperatures near the ground tend to be slightly higher during the day, which helps to maximize photosynthesis, and plants are less exposed to wind close to the ground.

Unlike alpine ecosystems, which do not have long enough growing seasons to support annuals or ephemeral perennials, subalpine ecosystems do often support these growth forms, particularly on south-facing slopes. Annuals that grow in subalpine are usually quite small and grow very fast.

The most ubiquitous adaptation of subalpine plants is the ability to perform metabolic activities at extremely low temperatures. Again, without this trait, the growing season would not be long enough to support sustained life. A side effect of this trait is slow growth, even when conditions are good, which may be a major factor in setting the lower limits of subalpine zones. Because subalpine tree species have such slow growth, they are out-competed at lower elevations by trees capable of more rigorous growth, such as red fir. Slow growth, however, may be an adaptation in and of itself in extremely harsh environments as it leads to very long-lived individuals. Many of the tree species in Sierran subalpine are capable of living over 500 years. Whitebark pine has been found to live as long as 800 years, and foxtail pine, which is closely related to bristlecone pine (Pinus longaevis) has been estimated to live 2500–3000 years. Seedling establishment in the harsh subalpine environment is difficult, so evolution has instead favored long-lived individuals that are reproductively active for tens or hundreds of years.

== Species interactions ==
The harsh conditions present in the subalpine zone are sufficient to keep competitive interactions at a minimal level. Species interactions theory predicts that competition should be low in stressful environments and that positive, mutualistic interactions should be favored (e.g.) In fact, lichens, which are mutualisms between fungi and algae or cyanobacteria, are common in subalpine and alpine ecosystems. The clumpy nature of subalpine vegetation is also in part a manifestation of a positive interaction, whereby individuals increase their fitness by having neighbors that reduce the effects of high wind and cold temperatures.

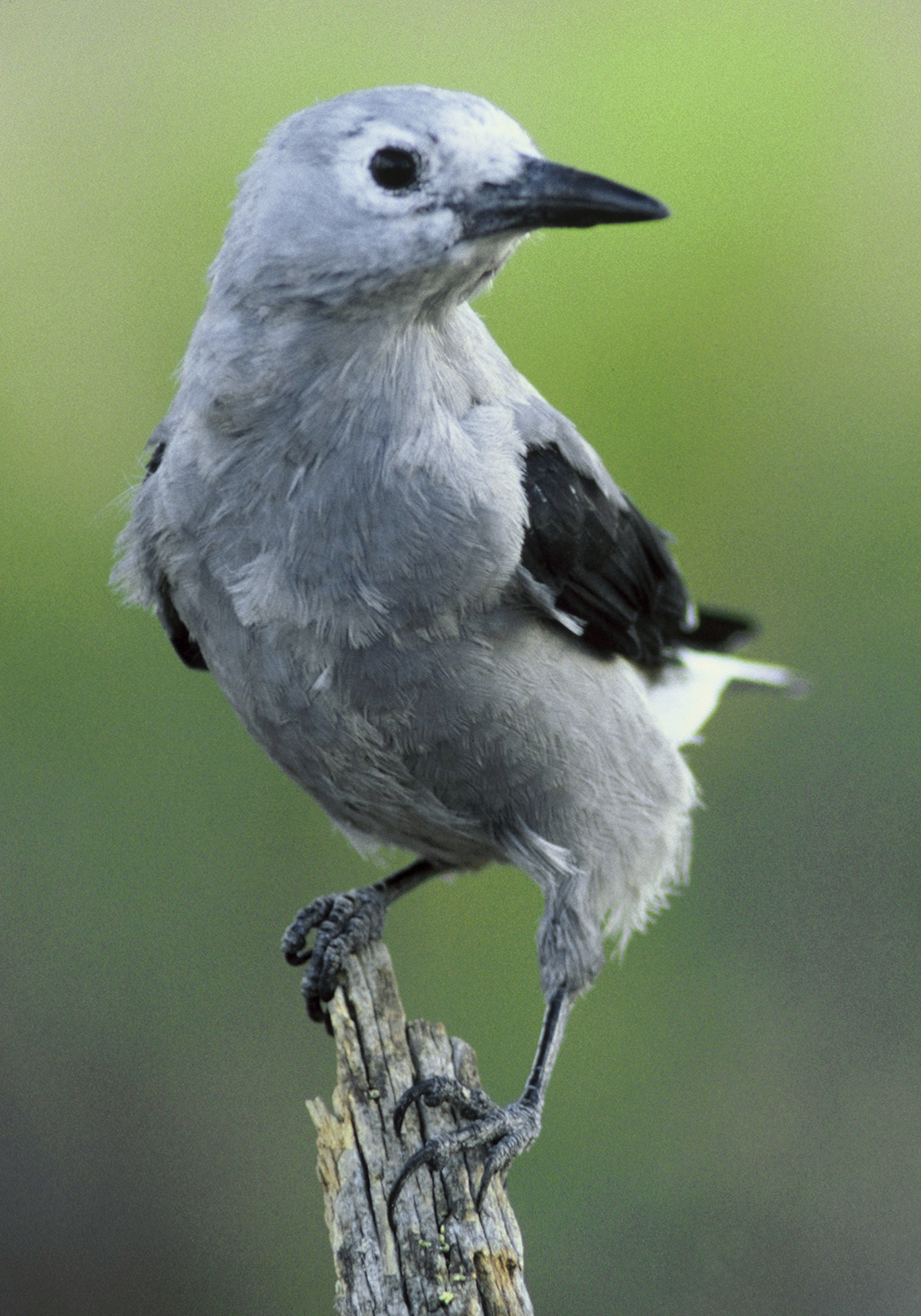
Clark's nutcracker

There is a mutualistic interaction between Clark's nutcracker and two pines of the subalpine zone. Most pine species are wind-dispersed and their seeds are flat and winged. However, whitebark pine and limber pine both have non-winged, succulent seeds that have probably co-evolved with Clark's nutcrackers. These birds, which use the seeds as a staple food source, cache seeds in the soil and in cracks of rocks. Like most caching species, the nutcrackers store more than they can ever find and eat, so many of the seeds can germinate when conditions are favorable. In the subalpine, this type of seed dispersal may be particularly advantageous because seeds find themselves immediately protected from high winds and low temperatures, and are therefore more likely to succeed during germination.

== Environmental issues ==
=== Climate change ===
Because the Sierran subalpine is situated in such harsh conditions, i.e. nearly at the limit of tree growth, the ecosystem is particularly sensitive to changes in climate. The long-lived nature of subalpine species plus their relative isolation from civilization make subalpine ecosystems a particularly good study system to examine climate change.

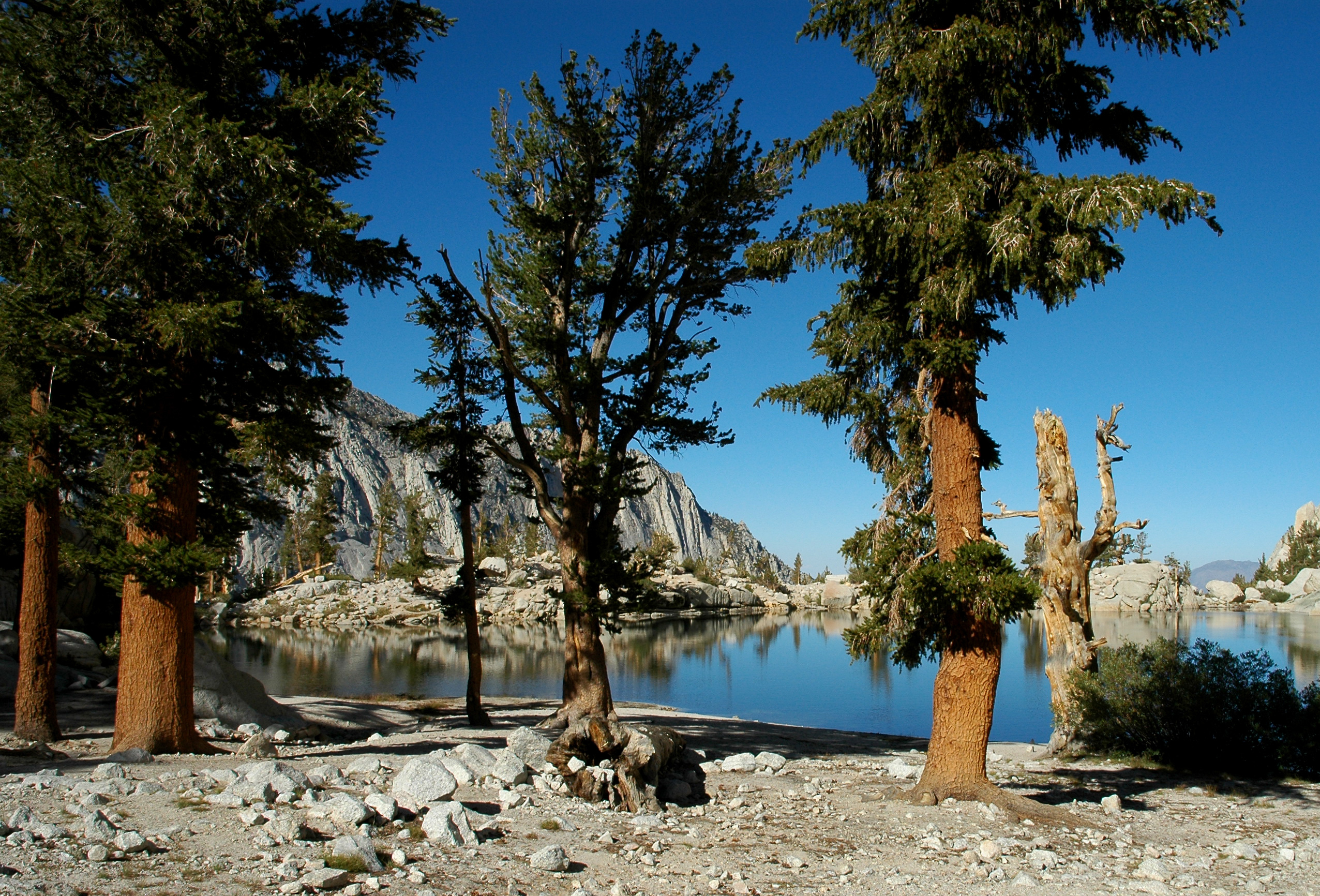
Whitebark pine and foxtail pines at Lone Pine Lake

The precise elevation of tree line within a given subalpine region has likely fluctuated up- and downslope throughout the history of the Sierra. However, some climatic changes occurring currently in subalpine appear to be unprecedented. Peterson et al. concluded that basal area increment (i.e. growth) increased for all age classes of whitebark pine and lodgepole pine over a 30-year period beginning around 1960. Millar et al. observed increased growth in whitebark pine and accelerated encroachment into snowfields by whitebark pine and western white pine during the 20th century, particularly since 1980. Bunn et al. showed that recent growth rates of subalpine conifers are greater than rates from any other period during the past 1000 years.

Specifically how subalpine ecosystems will respond to warming is yet to be determined. One logical (albeit largely untested) prediction is that plant communities will retreat upslope. If this prediction becomes a reality, it would likely mean the loss of a significant proportion of the subalpine zone that exists today. Since subalpine is the highest zone on many mountain peaks, the migration of subalpine to higher elevations will instead result in a reduction of the zone; in a manner of speaking, species will be pushed off the mountain. In a report sponsored by the California Energy Commission and the California Environmental Protection Agency, researchers simulated the effects of three different warming scenarios on different vegetation types in California over a period of 80–100 years. They concluded that alpine and subalpine vegetation would be reduced by approximately 50-80% of its current total cover.

=== Pollution ===
Few studies have addressed pollution in subalpine in the Sierra Nevada, although tree species present there may ultimately prove sensitive to certain atmospheric pollutants. One study from subalpine in the European Alps showed increased levels of atmospheric deposition of nitrogen at some locations. Jeffrey and ponderosa pine are susceptible to ozone pollution in the Sierra Nevada, but mostly at lower elevations. However, another study from the European Alps demonstrated the sensitivity of a native subalpine conifer to ozone pollution

=== Other environmental issues ===
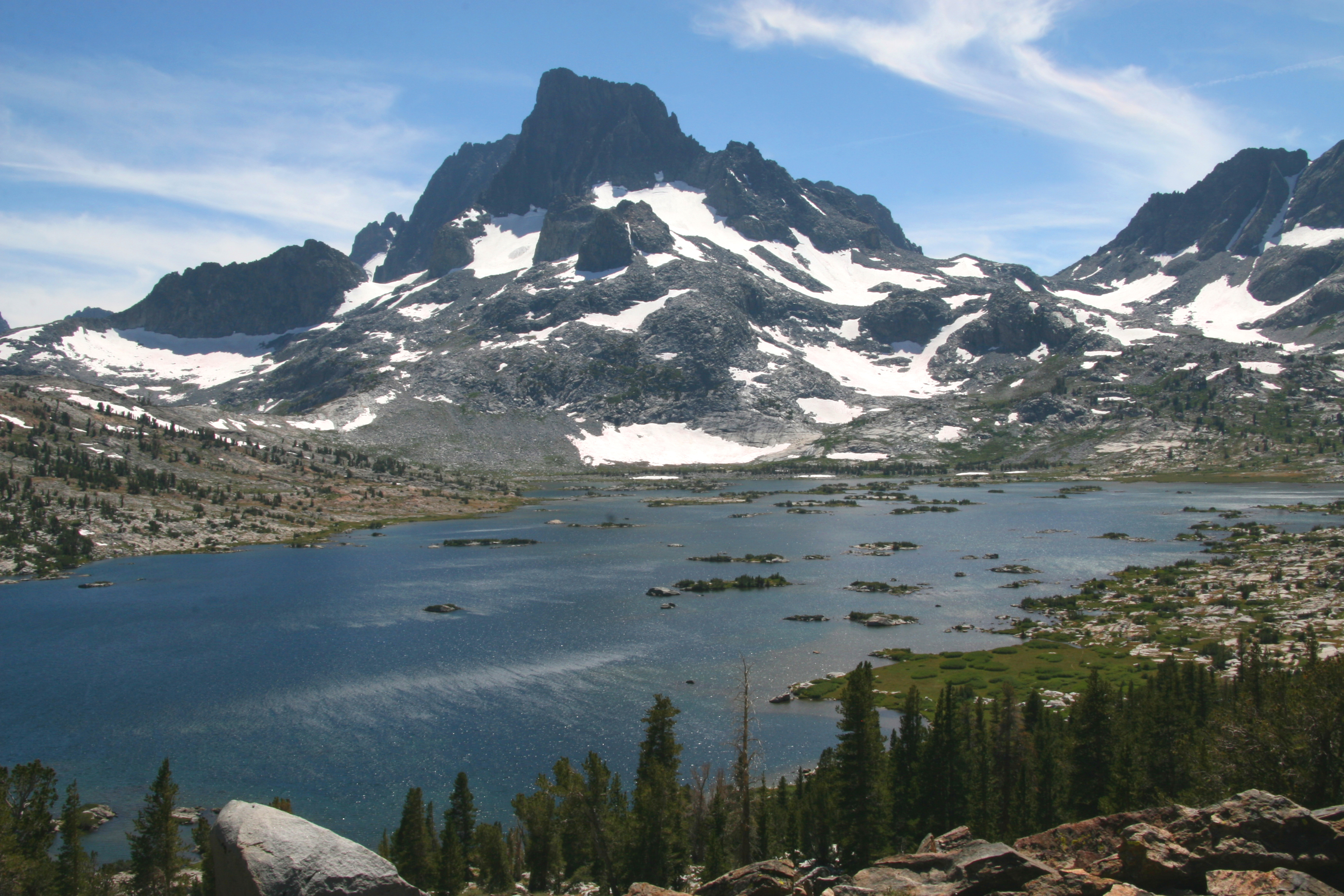
Subalpine zone near Banner Peak, Ansel Adams Wilderness

The isolation and restricted use of subalpine systems keep them relatively free of recreational impacts. The harsh climate also makes these systems robust against biological invasion and disease. Most exotic plants in California are currently restricted to low elevations, although some invasive species may have the potential to reach the subalpine zone. If climate change does indeed warm regions where the subalpine zone occurs, conditions there may become more conducive to threats such as invasive species as the local ecosystem is disrupted. Similarly, changes in climate may induce changes in disease ecology which could make native species more vulnerable to disease.

== See also ==
- Ecology of the Sierra Nevada
- Flora of the Sierra Nevada
