= Alik Ismail-Zadeh =

German mathematical geophysicist (born 1961)

- Born: 28 September 1961 (age 64); Baku, Azerbaijan
- Education: Baku State University (BSc, Mathematics), Lomonosov Moscow State University (MSc, Mathematical Physics), Russian Academy of Sciences (PhD and DSc (Habilitation), both Geophysics), Karlsruhe Institute of Technology (Habilitation, Computational Geodynamics)
- Honors: Fellow, International Core Academy of Sciences and Humanities (ICAcad) (2026); Fellow, International Science Council (ISC) (2022); Ambassador Award and Fellow, American Geophysical Union (AGU) (2019); Fellow, International Union of Geodesy and Geophysics (IUGG) (2019); Member of the Academia Europaea (2017); Honorary Fellow, RAS (2013); Axford Distinguished Lecture Award, Asia Oceania Geosciences Society(2012); International Award, AGU (2009); Alexander von Humboldt Foundation Fellowship Award(2001)
- Scientific career
- Fields: Mathematics, Geophysics
- Doctoral advisor: Vladimir Keilis-Borok, Boris Naimark
- Website: http://comgeodyn.org

Alik Ismail-Zadeh is a mathematical geophysicist known for his contribution to computational geodynamics and natural hazard studies, pioneering work on data assimilation in geodynamics as well as for outstanding service to the Earth and space science community. He is Research Professor (Privatdozent) at the Karlsruhe Institute of Technology in Germany.

== Biography and academic career ==
Born in Baku, Azerbaijan, Ismail-Zadeh attended the Bulbul specialized secondary music school of the Baku Academy of Music and Baku High School #134 (specialized in mathematics) between 1967 and 1978. He graduated from the Baku State University and the Lomonosov Moscow State University in 1983 before being awarded a Ph.D. degree in 1990 and D. Sc. (Habilitation) in 1997 from the Russian Academy of Sciences in Moscow, Russia. Ismail-Zadeh has been affiliated with the Azerbaijan National Academy of Sciences, Institute of Geology and Geophysics (1983-1986, 1990–1992). He has been chief scientist, research professor and scientific leader of research group "Computational Geodynamics and Geohazard Modeling" of the Russian Academy of Sciences Institute of Earthquake Prediction Theory and Mathematical Geophysics, Moscow (1992–2022).

He has been a visiting scholar, lecturer and professor at several universities and academic centers, including the University of Cambridge (UK), University of California at Los Angeles, the University of Tokyo (Japan), Institut de Physique du Globe de Paris (France), the University of Uppsala (Sweden), and the Abdus Salam International Centre for Theoretical Physics in Trieste (Italy).

== Research ==
Ismail-Zadeh has conducted research in the fields of geodynamics, seismology, sedimentary basins and tectonics (incl. research for petroleum industry), geological hazards, disaster risk reduction analysis, science diplomacy, and history. He is a principal author and co-author of over 150 peer-reviewed papers and several books published by the Cambridge University Press, Springer Nature, and others. Scientific results obtained by him and his group are as follows:

Inverse problems and data assimilation

- Introduction of data assimilation in models of geodynamics and applications to mantle (plume) dynamics.;
- Reconstruction of sinking lithosphere in the southeastern Carpathians;
- Reconstruction of the western Pacific and Philippine plate subduction beneath the Japanese islands and implication on the Japan Sea opening;
- Reconstruction of flow and temperature inside volcanic lava flow based on surface observations;
- Restoration of sedimentary basin evolution complicated by salt tectonics: application to Pricaspian basin of the East European platform.

Lithosphere dynamics and seismicity

- Model of the block-and-fault dynamics
- Quantitative models of a fault network interaction in the Tibet-Himalayan region to explain seismicity and slip rates at major regional faults;
- Peculiarities of the Vrancea intermediate-depth seismicity

Seismic and volcanic hazard and risk

- Deterministic and probabilistic seismic hazard assessments for the Vrancea region (Romania), Tibet-Himalaya, and Shillong Plateau (India). Earthquake risk assessment for the Baku city (Azerbaijan);
- Volcanic lava hazard evaluation based on lava flow with debris.

Tectonic stress

- Understanding of tectonic stress localization and its change in the lithospheric slab in terms of style of the slab subduction;
- Explanation of coexisting shortening - extension and seismic activity in the Central Apennines by the buoyancy of the lithosphere;
- Tectonic stress localization in the Vrancea earthquake-prone body beneath the south-eastern Carpathians.

Sedimentary basins

- Introduction of eclogitization-induced mantle flow mechanism for sedimentary basin evolution;
- Quantitative models of the evolution of intracratonic sedimentary basins in North America (Illinois, Michigan and Williston basins), East European (Dnieper-Donets, Moscow, Pre-Ural, Timan-Pechora basins), and Siberian (Tunguska and Viluy basins) platforms;
- Models of geothermal evolution of the Astrakhan Arch of the Pricaspian Basin.

Numerical methods for geodynamics

- New numerical methods and algorithms of an enhanced accuracy to study problems of Earth's dynamics;
- Numerical methodology for data assimilation in geodynamics (backward advection, variational/adjoint, and quasi-reversibility methods).

Gravitational and thermal instability

- Theoretical results in problems of Rayleigh-Taylor and Rayleigh-Bernard instabilities of the (geo) structures including analysis of Newtonian, Maxwell, non-Newtonian power law, and perfectly plastic rheologies;
- Applications to salt diapirism: Models of salt structure evolution in the Pricaspain Basin

== Organizational activities ==
Alik Ismail-Zadeh is active in promoting science research, science excellency and science for society worldwide. From 2018 to 2021, Ismail-Zadeh served as (inaugural) secretary-general of the International Science Council (ISC). Also, he was (inaugural) chair of the ISC Awards Programme Committee. Currently, he is Vice-Chair of the ISC Fellowship Council and Chair of the Scientific Committee of the Integrated Research on Disaster Risk Programme jointly co-sponsored by ISC and United Nations Office for Disaster Risk Reduction (UNDRR).

Ismail-Zadeh was elected secretary-general of the International Union of Geodesy and Geophysics (IUGG) in 2007, and served the union for 12 years in this capacity (until 2019). He also served the union as chair of the IUGG Commission on Geophysical Risk and Sustainability (2003–2007). He is chair of the IUGG Commission on Mathematical Geophysics (2019–2027). He has been a member of the scientific council of the UNESCO East African Institute for Fundamental Research (EAIFR), Kigali, Rwanda, since 2018.

He was a founding member and the (inaugural) governing board member of the European Association for the Promotion of Science and Technology (EuroScience); (inaugural) president of the Natural Hazards Section of the American Geophysical Union (AGU); chair of the Committee on Sergei Soloviev Medal on Natural Hazards of the European Geosciences Union (EGU); chair of the steering committee of GeoUnions grouped under the International Science Council; and council member of the UNESCO International Geoscience Program. He served the Comprehensive Nuclear-Test-Ban Treaty Organization [CTBTO], the Group on Earth Observations [GEO], the United Nations Office for Disaster Risk Reduction [UNDRR] and the United Nations International Year of Planet Earth [IYPE; 2007-2009] in various capacities.

Alik Ismail-Zadeh has been editor or member of several editorial/advisory boards, including Surveys in Geophysics, Springer Nature; Special Publications of Geodesy and Geophysics series, Cambridge University Press; Computational Seismology and Geodynamics, American Geophysical Union

== Awards and honours ==
- Fellow, International Core Academy of Sciences and Humanities (2026)
- Fellow, International Science Council (2022)
- Distinguished Lecturer of the College of Fellows, American Geophysical Union (2021-2023)
- Ambassador Award, American Geophysical Union (2019)
- Fellow, American Geophysical Union (2019)
- Fellow, International Union of Geodesy and Geophysics (2019)
- Member, Academia Europaea (2017)
- Honorary Fellow, Royal Astronomical Society (2013)
- Axford Distinguished Lecture Award, Asia Oceania Geosciences Society (2012)
- International Award, AGU (2009)
- Fellowship Award, Alexander von Humboldt Foundation (2001)
- Research Award to Earlier Career Scientist, Russian president Boris Yeltsin (1999)
- Prize to Young Scientist, Academia Europaea (1995)
