= Drought Research Initiative =

The Drought Research Initiative (DRI) was established to better understand the characteristics and processes influencing Canadian Prairie droughts and better predict them, focusing on the severe drought which began in 1999 and largely ended in 2005. It is an interdisciplinary effort involving 15 funded investigators from six Canadian universities, over 20 collaborators from other universities and federal laboratories, and partners from three provincial governments (Alberta, Manitoba and Saskatchewan). The DRI focuses on five research themes: quantification, understanding, prediction, comparisons with other droughts, and implications for society. Details may be found in Stewart et al. (2008) and on the DRI website.

== Background ==
Drought is an anomaly of the atmospheric, surface, and sub-surface cycling of water and energy, usually initiated with large- to regional-scale atmospheric processes, and enhanced and maintained with regional-to-local atmospheric, surface hydrology, land surface and groundwater feedback in an annual cycle. Droughts are a feature of the Canadian Prairies, where large-scale atmospheric circulation is influenced by blocking from intense orography from the west and warm ocean-derived atmospheric water sources.

The DRI addresses a multi-year drought which began in 1999, ending its atmospheric component in 2004–2005 and many of its hydrological components in 2005. It was the worst drought for at least a hundred years in portions of the prairie provinces. According to Phillips (2002), for the western and central Canadian Prairies during 2001 and 2002 "... it was the worst of times. Even in the dust bowl of the 1930s, no single year between Medicine Hat, Kindersley and Saskatoon was drier than in 2001". The drought affected agriculture, recreation, tourism, health, hydroelectricity, and forestry in the Prairies. Gross domestic product fell about $5.8 billion, and job losses exceeded 41,000 in 2001 and 2002. It contributed to negative (or zero net) farm income for several provinces for the first time in 25 years, with agricultural production in Canada falling by an estimated $3.6 billion in 2001–2002. Previously-reliable water supplies, such as streams, wetlands, reservoirs, and groundwater, were stressed and often failed.

== Research ==
The DRI focuses on five research themes, including quantification, understanding, and better drought prediction, and is largely funded by the Canadian Foundation for Climate and Atmospheric Sciences. Comparisons with other droughts and their implications for society have also been supported by Environment Canada, Agriculture and Agri-Food Canada, Natural Resources Canada, Prairie Farm Rehabilitation Administration, Saskatchewan Watershed Authority, Saskatchewan Research Council, Manitoba Water Stewardship and Manitoba Hydro.

=== Characterization ===
To characterize the 1999–2005 drought, the DRI has been quantifying its atmospheric, hydrologic, and land-surface physical features on a number of spatial and temporal scales. The analysis addresses three questions:

- What variables are required to quantify the drought?
- What data sources and model outputs are available to quantify the variables?
- How are budgets of water and energy characterized in the prairie provinces?

The analysis has included a four-dimensional assessment of the atmosphere during the drought over a number of temporal scales using temperature, humidity, geopotential height, wind, clouds, precipitation amount, and current weather. At the surface, the spatial and temporal characteristics of a vegetative state (water stress) for major vegetation types (crops and boreal zones), soil moisture, stream networks, river flows, lake levels, wetlands, depression storage, groundwater and sub-surface flows are assessed to determine when and where drought is occurring. Analysis of in-situ data, satellite data and model outputs provide an overview of the drought's evolution.

=== Processes ===
The DRI is also focused on understanding the processes and feedback governing the formation, evolution, cessation, and structure of the drought with the following questions:

- What processes were responsible for the onset of the drought?
- What processes and feedback contributed to its evolution, persistence, and structure?
- What processes and feedback controlled its end?

Drought can be initiated and prolonged in a number of ways. Processes which reduce precipitation include large-scale circulation anomalies, lack of moisture advected into a region, reduction of local moisture supplies, the production of virga (with precipitation not reaching the ground), and the possible role of aerosols in a dusty environment. During the five-year drought, these processes and other factors operated at a number of times and locations to preclude substantial precipitation over large portions of the Prairies.

=== Prediction ===
Research aims to assess and reduce uncertainties in the prediction of drought and its structure, and is focused on the evaluation and improvement of models; modelling tools used are global and regional climate models (GCMs and RCMs) and hydrological models. Hydrological models are driven by output from atmospheric models, data from research sites, and reanalysis. DRI modeling studies address the following questions:

- How well was the current drought predicted, based on contemporary techniques?
- How much could the prediction be improved with better initialization?
- How much could the prediction be improved with dynamic downscaling and better physics?
- What are the appropriate scales and processes for the prediction of Prairie droughts?

Archived historical-model outputs and new simulations address many of these issues, and DRI research assesses the role of soil moisture and snow cover on seasonal predictions.

=== Comparisons ===
The 1999–2005 drought has been compared with previous droughts in this region and elsewhere in the context of climate variability and change. These comparisons are guided by the following questions:

- How do the physical features, processes, and feedback of the recent Canadian Prairie drought compare with a) previous droughts in the Canadian Prairies, b) nationwide droughts, c) US Great Plains droughts, and d) droughts around the world?
- How does the prediction of this drought compare with those of other droughts?
- How does this drought compare with past climate variability and projected climate change?

Comparisons of the 1999-2005 drought have focused on its internal structure and presence in a particular region. Many droughts (including this one) have a complex internal structure for their precipitation patterns, which often change dramatically during the drought.

=== Impacts ===
Progress in drought characterization and prediction impacts society, reflected in the following questions:

- Which organizations are affected by drought?
- What are these effects, and how can they be alleviated?
- How can the DRI address drought impacts on affected organizations?

The DRI, in consultation with its users, has introduced a DEWS (Drought Early Warning System) test and formed an advisory committee consisting of experts from user agencies and groups.

== Program structure ==
The DRI is led by principal investigators Ronald Stewart and John Pomeroy. A board of directors chaired by Jim Bruce oversees the program's strategy, and a science committee makes day-to-day decisions about the implementation of the project. Operational details are implemented by a secretariat consisting of a network manager, a financial manager, and two data managers. The Partners Advisory Committee, chaired by Harvey Hill, reports user needs to the board of directors. The program also collaborates with research initiatives and departments at the provincial, federal and international level.

== Legacy ==
The DRI has assembled an unprecedented volume of information on drought in Canada, and its website links to datasets which quantify elements of drought in the atmosphere, at the surface and below the surface; a Prairie-wide database of provincial groundwater and water levels is part of this effort. Synthesis articles and a public-information document about the 1999-2005 drought are in preparation, and new techniques of archiving and releasing datasets are being explored. Young scientists at the Ph.D. and Master's levels have conducted much of the initiative's research, and are pursuing careers in related disciplines.
