= Kissel (disambiguation) =

Kissel is a Slavic cold-solidified dish with the consistency of a thick gel, popular as a dessert and as a drink. Kissel may also refer to:

== People ==
- Andrew Kissel (1959–2006), murdered American real estate developer
- Brett Kissel (born 1990), Canadian country singer
- Catherine Kissel (born 1958), French geophysicist
- Hans Kissel (1897–1975), Generalmajor in the Wehrmacht during World War II
- John Kissel (New York politician) (1864–1938), New York State Senate
- John Kissel (Connecticut politician) (born 1959), Connecticut State Senate
- Michael Case Kissel (1948–2009), American music producer and engineer
- Robert Kissel (1963–2003), murdered investment banker

== Other ==
- Kissel Motor Car Company, American automobile and truck manufacturing company active from 1906 to 1942
- 21450 Kissel, a minor planet named for Intel Science Talent Search mentor Stacy Kissel
- Kissel Hill, Pennsylvania, a small community

== See also ==
- Kissell (disambiguation)
