= Drought in Canada =

Prolonged, large-area droughts are among Canada's costliest natural disasters having major impacts on a wide range of sectors including agriculture, forestry, industry, municipalities, recreation, human health, society and ecosystems. They frequently stress water availability by depleting soil moisture, reducing stream flows, lowering lake and reservoir levels, and diminishing groundwater supplies. This ultimately affects several economic activities including for example, decreased agricultural production, less hydro-electric power generation, and increased freshwater transportation costs. Droughts also create major environmental hazards such as reduced water quality, wetland loss, soil erosion and degradation, and ecological habitat destruction.

== Recent major droughts (2015–2025) ==
According to the Canadian drought monitor, as of the end of July, 2025, 71% of Canada's agricultural landscape was classified as Abnormally Dry (D0) or Moderate to Extreme Drought (D1 to D3).

Severe drought conditions have impacted major regions, including British Columbia, Alberta, Saskatchewan, Manitoba, northwestern Ontario, northern Quebec, and parts of the Northwest Territories. There is more extreme heat, escalating heatwaves, exceptionally low precipitation, higher water demand, and agricultural stress. Drought and wildfires are now a seasonally recurring crisis in parts of the country.

In 2022, The Globe and Mail cited John Pomeroy, Canada Research Chair in Water Resources and Climate Change saying that "Prairies have had unprecedented summer flooding and droughts in the last decade. Lake-ice formation is changing, and glaciers have disappeared or retreated by kilometres. These are big changes that will require large societal shifts". The article also cited Dr. James Bruce, the Canadian co-founder of the UN’s Intergovernmental Panel on Climate Change, who said, "If climate change is a shark, then water are its teeth".

Increased frequencies of forest fires during drought years can have serious economic impacts. A 2023 report by Agriculture and Agri-Food Canada said that 97% of agricultural landscape in the Prairies was "abnormally dry or experiencing moderate to exceptional drought". In Alberta, there were 51 water shortage advisories in place in December 2023.

== History of droughts ==
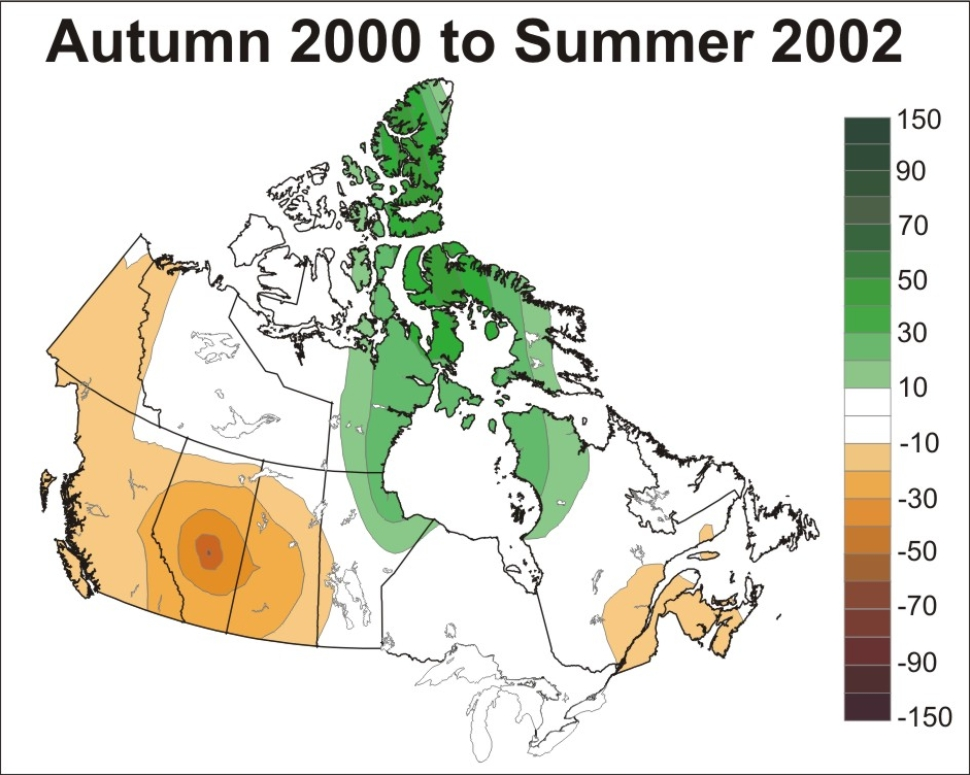
Average precipitation departures from normal over Canada from autumn 2000 through summer 2002. Precipitation departures are relative to the 1961-90 reference period.

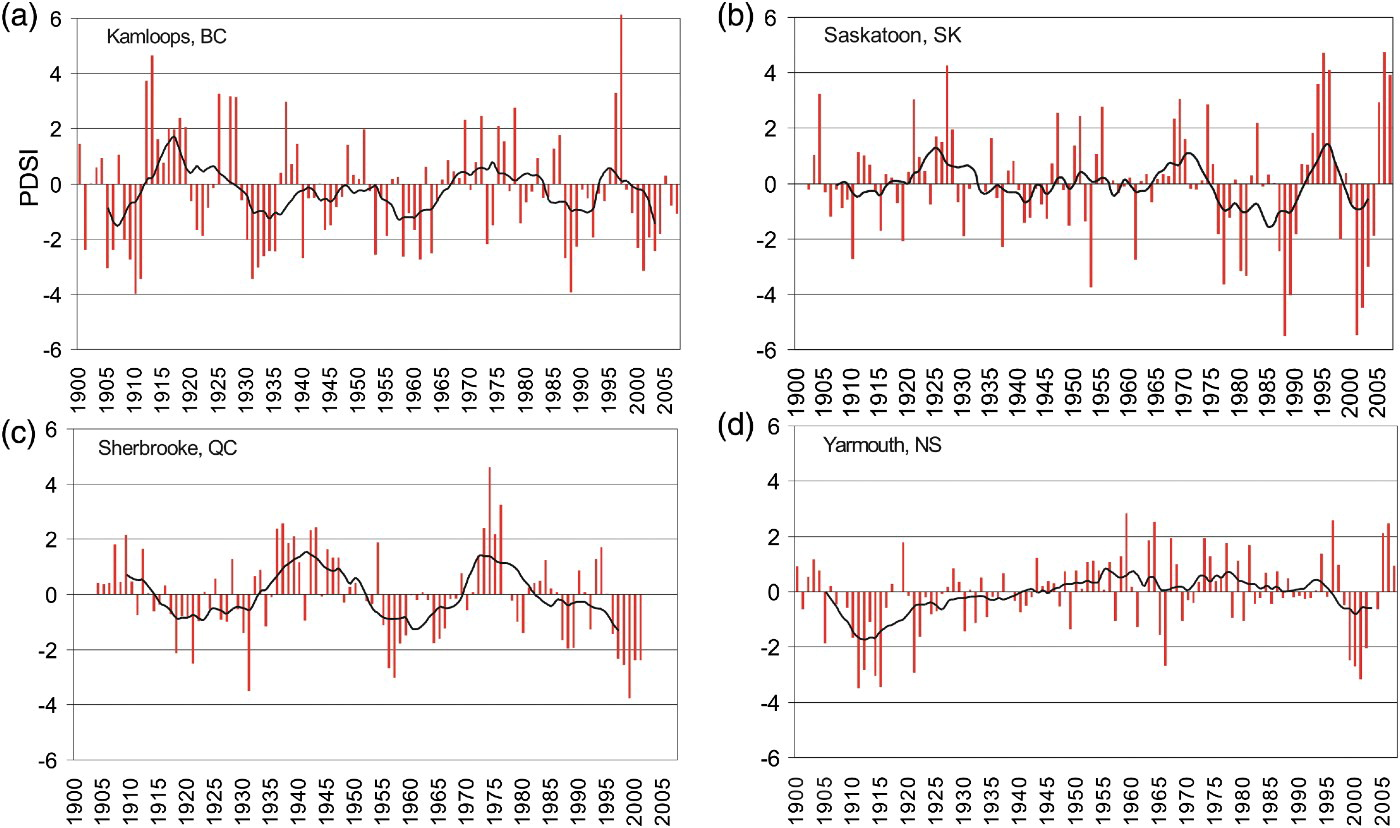
Annual Palmer Drought Severity (PDSI) values for a) Kamloops, BC, b) Saskatoon, SK, c) Sherbrooke, QC, and d) Yarmouth, NS. Solid lines represent 10-year running means.

Although most regions of Canada have experienced drought, many of the southern regions of the Canadian Prairies and interior British Columbia are most susceptible. During the past two centuries, at least 40 droughts have occurred in western Canada with multi-year episodes being observed in the 1890s, 1910s, 1930s, 1960s, 1980s, and the early 2000s. Droughts in southern Ontario/Quebec are usually shorter, smaller in area, less frequent, and less intense. Nonetheless, there have been some major drought occurrences there as well during the 20th century. Droughts in the Atlantic Provinces occur even less frequently. Droughts are less of a concern for northern Canada mainly due to their lower population densities.

=== 1999–2005 prairie drought ===
The 1999–2005 prairie drought was the worst drought for at least a hundred years in parts of the Canadian Prairies, according to the Drought Research Initiative (DRI), a Canadian research initiative established in 2005 response to the historic drought and funded by the Canadian Foundation for Climate and Atmospheric Sciences (CFCAS). Well below normal precipitation was reported in areas of Alberta and Saskatchewan for more than four consecutive years extending from autumn 1999 to spring 2004. No single year on record between Medicine Hat, Kindersley, and Saskatoon was drier than in 2001. The years 2001 and 2002 may have also brought the first coast-to-coast droughts on record, and were rare as they struck areas less accustomed to dealing with droughts including parts of Atlantic Canada and the northern agricultural prairies (see Figure 1). Canada's Gross Domestic Product fell $5.8 billion for 2001 and 2002. In addition, previously reliable water supplies such as streams, wetlands, reservoirs, and groundwater were placed under stress and often failed. For example, the number of natural Prairie ponds in May 2002 was the lowest on record while in 2001, Great Lakes-St. Lawrence water levels plunged to their lowest point in more than 30 years, thereby significantly increasing marine transportation costs. In British Columbia and Manitoba, hydro-electric generation was curtailed, necessitating additional purchases of power from neighboring jurisdictions. In 2002, the incidence of forest fires in Alberta increased to five times the ten-year average while in summer 2003, populated regions of interior British Columbia were stricken by drought-enhanced fires. Long-lasting impacts include soil degradation by wind erosion and deterioration of grasslands that could take decades and longer to recover.

High surface temperatures intensify droughts by enhancing evapotranspiration in summer, and increasing sublimation and melting of the snowpack during winter. During the 20th century, mean annual air temperature has increased by around 1 °C over southern Canada with the greatest warming in the west and the largest rates during winter and spring. Over the same period, annual precipitation has significantly increased over most of southern Canada with the exception of southern Alberta and Saskatchewan. Coincident with the large increases in spring temperature, the 1980s to the present have been associated with rapid reductions in snow cover during the second half of the snow season. Over the last 30 to 50 years, average stream flow has decreased in many parts of Canada with significant reductions in the south. Great Lakes’ water levels have shown substantial variability during the 20th century with no evidence of a long-term trend. Lower levels coincided with the droughts of the 1930s, early 1960s, and the recent 1999-2001 dry period. Over the Prairies, the numbers and water levels of wetlands have shown no clear trend over the last 40 to 50 years.

For their research from 2005 to c. 2009, DRI researchers used the Palmer Drought Severity Index (PDSI), the Standardized Precipitation Index (SPI), and the Crop Moisture Index (CMI) to measure drought. These drought indices showed considerable decadal-scale variability with no long-term trends discernible in any portion of the country. Most southern regions of Canada, however, experienced drought conditions during the late 1990s to early 2000s. The worst and most prolonged Canadian Prairie-wide droughts during the instrumental period occurred in the early part of the 20th century (1920s and 1930s). Paleo studies over the southwestern Canadian Prairies using tree ring chronologies dating back to 1597 indicate that the 20th century lacked the prolonged droughts of the 18th and 19th centuries when droughts were evident for decades at a time.

== Causes ==
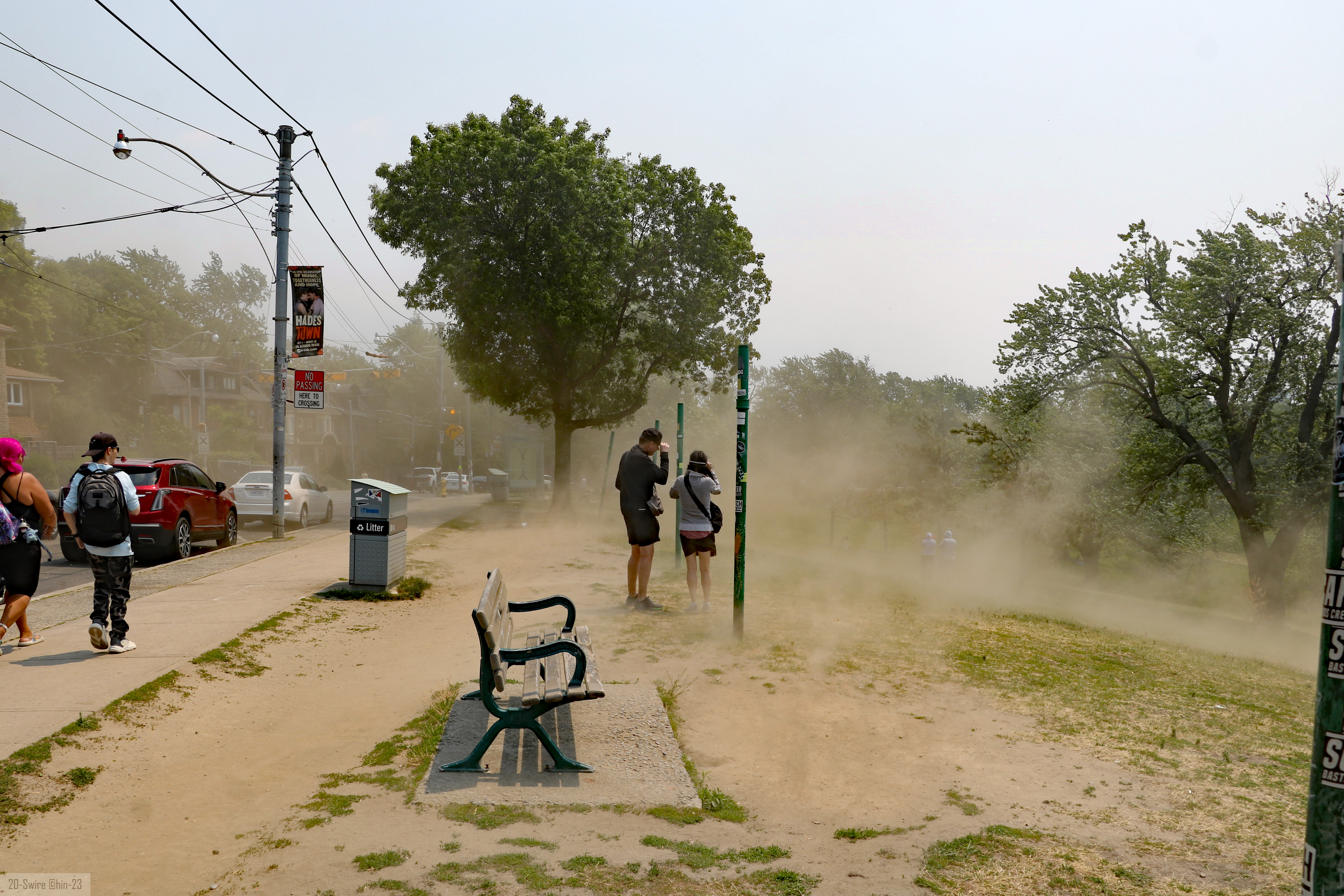
Dust from dry ground, Riverdale Park, Toronto

Although considerable research has been carried out on droughts, there is still no complete theory that explains their formation, persistence, and termination. The major factor in the onset and continuation of drought involves distinctive circulation patterns in the upper atmosphere. Over the Canadian Prairies for example, growing season extended dry periods are associated with a persistent atmospheric circulation pattern that includes a large-amplitude ridge centred over the area. This ridge creates ‘blocking conditions’ that displace storm tracks away from the area. Drought can also be initiated and/or accentuated during winter when a lack of snowfall results in lower than normal spring runoff and thus, reduced stream flow and reservoir and soil moisture replenishment. Reduced winter precipitation is also caused by persistent atmospheric circulation patterns that involve ridging over the affected area.

Droughts tend to persist. Warm, dry springs are followed by hot, dry summers; warm summers follow other warm summers; and so on. This relationship is likely related to feedback processes (such as soil moisture anomalies) that enhance or prolong drought situations (however, more research is required to verify this). A significant amount of research on drought in Canada has occurred as a part of the Drought Research Initiative, which focused in a comprehensive manner on the 1999-2005 drought in the Canadian Prairies.

Reasons for the persistence of circulation patterns that lead to drought are not entirely understood but are likely related to surface boundary conditions such as snow and ice cover, vegetation, soil moisture, and sea-surface temperatures (SSTs) that force the climate system through variations in their optical and thermal properties. These forcing factors directly influence local to regional atmospheric flow which in turn, can affect large-scale circulation over other areas of the globe (known as teleconnections). For Canada, significant relationships between El Niño and La Niña events and winter/spring temperature and precipitation have been determined. In general, El Niño is associated with warmer/drier winters while La Niña has an opposite effect. Linkages between Canadian climate and teleconnections such as the Pacific Decadal Oscillation and the North Atlantic Oscillation are also evident, but mainly during the winter season. Teleconnections during summer are not as strong. However, recent research has shown that some El Niño events are associated with a summer moisture deficit in the western two-thirds of Canada while La Niñas produce an abundance of summer moisture in extreme western Canada. The considerable lag between summer moisture and large-scale SSTs provides a basis for developing long-range forecasting of drought conditions in Canada.

== Examples ==
Greater Vancouver has been prone to summer droughts in recent years.

== Future droughts ==
In response to the economic and environmental significance of droughts, scientific concern has been expressed regarding climate change impacts on future drought frequency, duration, and severity over various regions of the globe including Canada. Climate models are projecting considerable increases to temperature and in general, small increases to precipitation over southern Canada. This translates into future increases of summer continental interior drying and associated risk of droughts. The increased drought risk is attributed to a combination of increased temperature and potential evapotranspiration not being balanced by precipitation. Note that considerable uncertainty exists with respect to future precipitation, particularly on a regional basis. Furthermore, there is little consensus regarding future changes to teleconnections and since these patterns have a significant impact on temperature and precipitation over Canada, insight into the relative occurrence of future drought remains a huge knowledge gap.

== Monitoring and prediction ==
Numerous indices that measure drought severity are used to monitor drought. These range from those that only consider precipitation, to complex indices that incorporate a water balance approach using precipitation, antecedent soil moisture, potential evapotranspiration, and runoff. For Canada, real-time information on pasture conditions, on-farm surface water supplies, and several drought indices are provided in Agriculture and Agri-Food Canada's Drought Watch web site. The site monitors the risk and status of drought over major agricultural regions of the country and also promotes practices to reduce drought vulnerability. The North American Drought Monitor has been established as a cooperative effort among drought experts in Canada, Mexico, and the U.S. to monitor drought on a weekly basis. The site provides North American maps based on a synthesis of multiple indices and local impacts that best represents current drought conditions.

Drought prediction involves anticipating climatic anomalies that produce unusually dry conditions for an extended period. Environment Canada produces three-month deterministic temperature and precipitation forecasts for the ensuing 1–3, 2–4, 4–6, 7–9, and 10–12 days periods. The 1-3 and 2-4 month forecasts are based upon an ensemble of 40 model runs. Probabilistic forecasts, which give estimates of the probability that the seasonal mean will be above, near, or below normal are also provided for the 1-3 and 2-4 month periods. Forecasts for 4–6, 7-9 and 10–12 months are produced with a statistical method. The forecasts are updated on a monthly basis and posted on the Environment Canada Seasonal Forecasts website.

== Adaptation ==
Adaptation involves adjusting to climate change, variability, and extremes to avoid or alleviate negative impacts and benefit from opportunities. Drought adaptations include short to long-term actions, programs, and policies implemented both during, and in advance of the drought to help reduce risks to human life, property, and productive capacity. Canadians have a great deal of experience in adapting to droughts, however, their strategies vary by sector and location. Areas with greater drought risks are often better prepared to deal with dry conditions. Drought adaptation decisions are made at a variety of levels ranging from individuals, to groups and institutions, to local and national governments. There are various adaptation processes or strategies including sharing and/or bearing the loss, modifying drought effects, research, education, behavioral changes, and avoidance. Adaptive measures include soil and water conservation, improved irrigation, the construction of infrastructure (wells, pipelines, reservoirs), and the exploration of groundwater supplies. The usefulness of these strategies varies with location, sector, and nature and timing of the drought. Better management responses may be made with improved drought monitoring and advanced prediction. Adjustments that occur after the drought are generally less effective compared to planned anticipatory adaptation.

== Key references ==
Bonsal, B.R., Aider, R., Gachon, P., Lapp, S. 2013. An assessment of Canadian prairie drought: past, present, and future, Climate Dynamics, Volume 41, Issue 2, pp 501–516

Bonsal, B.R., Chakravarti, A.K. and Lawford, R.G. 1993. Teleconnections between north Pacific SST anomalies and growing season extended dry spells on the Canadian Prairies, International Journal of Climatology, 13, 865–878.

Bonsal, B.R., Shabbar, A. and Higuchi, K. 2001. Impacts of low frequency variability modes on Canadian winter temperature, International Journal of Climatology, 21, 95-108.

Bonsal, B.R. and Regier, M. 2007 Historical comparison of the 2001/2002 drought in the Canadian Prairies, Climate Research, 33, 229–242.

Brown, R.D. 2000. Northern Hemisphere snow cover variability and change, 1915–97, Journal of Climate, 13, 2339–2355.

Chipanshi, A.C., Findlater, K.M., Hadwen, T. and O’Brien, E.G. 2006. Analysis of consecutive droughts on the Canadian Prairies, Climate Research, 30, 175–187.

Maybank, J., Bonsal, B.R., Jones, K., Lawford, R.G., O’Brien, E.G., Ripley, E.A. and Wheaton, E. 1995. Drought as a natural disaster, Atmosphere-Ocean, 33, 195–222.

Meehl, G.A. and Stocker, T.F. 2007. Global Climate Projections, Chapter 10 in: Climate Change 2007: The Physical Science Basis, Intergovernmental Panel on Climate Change, Cambridge University Press, Cambridge, UK, pp. 747–845.

Sauchyn, D.J. and Skinner, W.R. 2001. A proxy record of drought severity for the southwestern Canadian plains, Canadian Water Resources Journal, 26, 253–272.

Shabbar, A., Bonsal, B.R. and Khandekar, M. 1997. Canadian precipitation patterns associated with the Southern Oscillation, Journal of Climate, 10, 3016–3027.

Shabbar, A. and Khandekar, M. 1996. The impact of El Niño-Southern Oscillation on the temperature field over Canada, Atmosphere-Ocean, 34, 401–416.

Shabbar, A. and Skinner, W. 2004. Summer drought patterns in Canada and the relationships to global sea surface temperatures, Journal of Climate, 17, 2866–2880.

Wheaton, E., Wittrock, V., Kulshreshtha, S., Koshida, G., Grant, C., Chipanshi, A. and Bonsal, B.R. 2005. Lessons Learned from the Canadian Drought Years of 2001 and 2002: Synthesis Report, Agriculture and Agri-Food Canada, Saskatchewan Research Council Publication No. 11602-46E03, Saskatoon, SK.

Zhang, X., Harvey, K.D., Hogg, W.D. and Yuzyk, T.R. 2001. Trends in Canadian streamflow, Water Resources Research, 37, 987–998.

Zhang, X., Vincent, L.A., Hogg, W.D. and Niitsoo, A. 2000. Temperature and precipitation trends in Canada during the 20th century, Atmosphere-Ocean, 38, 395–429.
