= Fatima Abrantes =

Portuguese geologist

- Education: University of Rhode Island
- Scientific career
- Thesis: Diatom evidence for latest Quaternary history of upwelling and biogenic productivity ; Portugal, NW Africa and Alboran Sea (1990)

Fatima Abrantes is a researcher at the Portuguese Institute for the Sea and Atmosphere who is known for her research on marine geology and for her promotion of ocean sciences in Portgual. In 2021 she received the Ambassador Award from the American Geophysial Union and was elected as fellow.

== Education ==
Abrantes's undergraduate work was the University of Lisbon where she graduated in 1980. She earned her Ph.D. from the University of Rhode Island in 1990, and her habilitation in 2007 from the University of Lisbon. Following her Ph.D., she returned to Portugal to work at the Portuguese Geological Society where she was the second women to join the society as a geologist.

== Career and research ==
Abrantes first experience in ocean science was a training class at the Lamont–Doherty Earth Observatory where she was able to research diatoms. She conducted research on geological insights that can be learned from studying diatoms, including the ability to track past tsnuamis.

Abrante was one of the initial founders of the Portuguese Association for Paleoceanography, which began in 2006

== Awards and honors ==
Abrantes was chosen to be a UNESCO fellow from 1989 to 1990, and then a Fulbright fellow in the period from 2003 to 2004. In 2021 Abrantes received the American Geophysical Union Ambassador Award, which also confers a position as fellow.

== Selected publications ==
- Abrantes, Fatima (1988-12-01). "Diatom assemblages as upwelling indicators in surface sediments off Portugal". Marine Geology. 85 (1): 15–39. doi:10.1016/0025-3227(88)90082-5. ISSN 0025-3227.
- Abrantes, Fatima (2000-02-28). "200 000 yr diatom records from Atlantic upwelling sites reveal maximum productivity during LGM and a shift in phytoplankton community structure at 185 000 yr". Earth and Planetary Science Letters. 176 (1): 7–16. doi:10.1016/S0012-821X(99)00312-X. ISSN 0012-821X.
- Abrantes, F.; Lebreiro, S.; Rodrigues, T.; Gil, I.; Bartels-Jónsdóttir, H.; Oliveira, P.; Kissel, C.; Grimalt, J. O. (2005-12-01). "Shallow-marine sediment cores record climate variability and earthquake activity off Lisbon (Portugal) for the last 2000 years". Quaternary Science Reviews. 24 (23): 2477–2494. doi:10.1016/j.quascirev.2004.04.009. ISSN 0277-3791.
- Voelker, Antje H. L.; Lebreiro, S. M.; Schönfeld, J.; Cacho, I.; Erlenkeuser, H.; Abrantes, F. (2006-05-15). "Mediterranean outflow strengthening during northern hemisphere coolings: A salt source for the glacial Atlantic?". Earth and Planetary Science Letters. 245 (1): 39–55. doi:10.1016/j.epsl.2006.03.014. ISSN 0012-821X.
