= Karletta Chief =

Hydrologist

- Citizenship: Navajo Nation, American
- Education: Stanford University (BS, MS} University of Arizona (PhD)
- Scientific career
- Fields: Hydrology; Pollution on the Navajo Nation
- Thesis: Soil Air Permeability and Saturated Hydraulic Conductivity: Development of Soil Corer Air Permeameter, Post-fire Soil Physical Changes, and 3D Air Flow Model in Anisotropic Soils (2007)

Karletta Chief is a Diné hydrologist, best known for her work to address environmental pollution on the Navajo Nation and increase the participation of Native Americans in STEM. She is a professor at the University of Arizona.

== Education ==
Chief earned her B.S. and M.S. in civil and environmental engineering at Stanford University. She completed her PhD in hydrology and water resources at the University of Arizona in 2007, where she is now a faculty member.

== Career ==
One of Chief's research interests is addressing food, energy and water challenges in Indigenous communities with methods that include their traditional values. In particular, she has researched the impacts of the 2015 Gold King Mine spill on residents of the Navajo Nation. Her research regarding the effects of the Gold King spill have aided several communities affected by the disaster. As part of this work, Chief gives public presentations in the Navajo language, especially to farmers, ranchers, and families who are affected by pollution and mining waste. She has said that her scientific research and her identity are closely linked, telling Science Friday, “my identity is water-based [from the Bitter Water Clan]. And so that motivates me to do the work that I do.”

Chief was featured in a short film produced by Science Friday in 2018, and is one of the interviewees in the feature documentary Hacking at Leaves.

== Selected awards and honors ==
- Most Promising Engineer/Scientist, American Indian Science and Engineering Society (AISES), 2011
- Distinguished Alumni Scholar, Stanford University, 2013
- Native American 40 Under 40, National Center for American Indian Enterprise Development, 2015
- Professional of the Year, AISES, 2016
- Woman of the Year, Phoenix Indian Center, 2016
- Featured Speaker, Society for the Advancement of Chicanos/Native Americans in STEM (SACNAS), 2019
- Ambassador Award (2020)
- Fellow, American Geophysical Union

== Selected publications ==
- Chief, K., R. E. Emanuel, and O. Conroy-Ben (2019), Indigenous symposium on water research, education, and engagement, Eos, 100. Published on 24 January 2019.
