= Michael E. Wysession =

Science author and educator

Michael Wysession
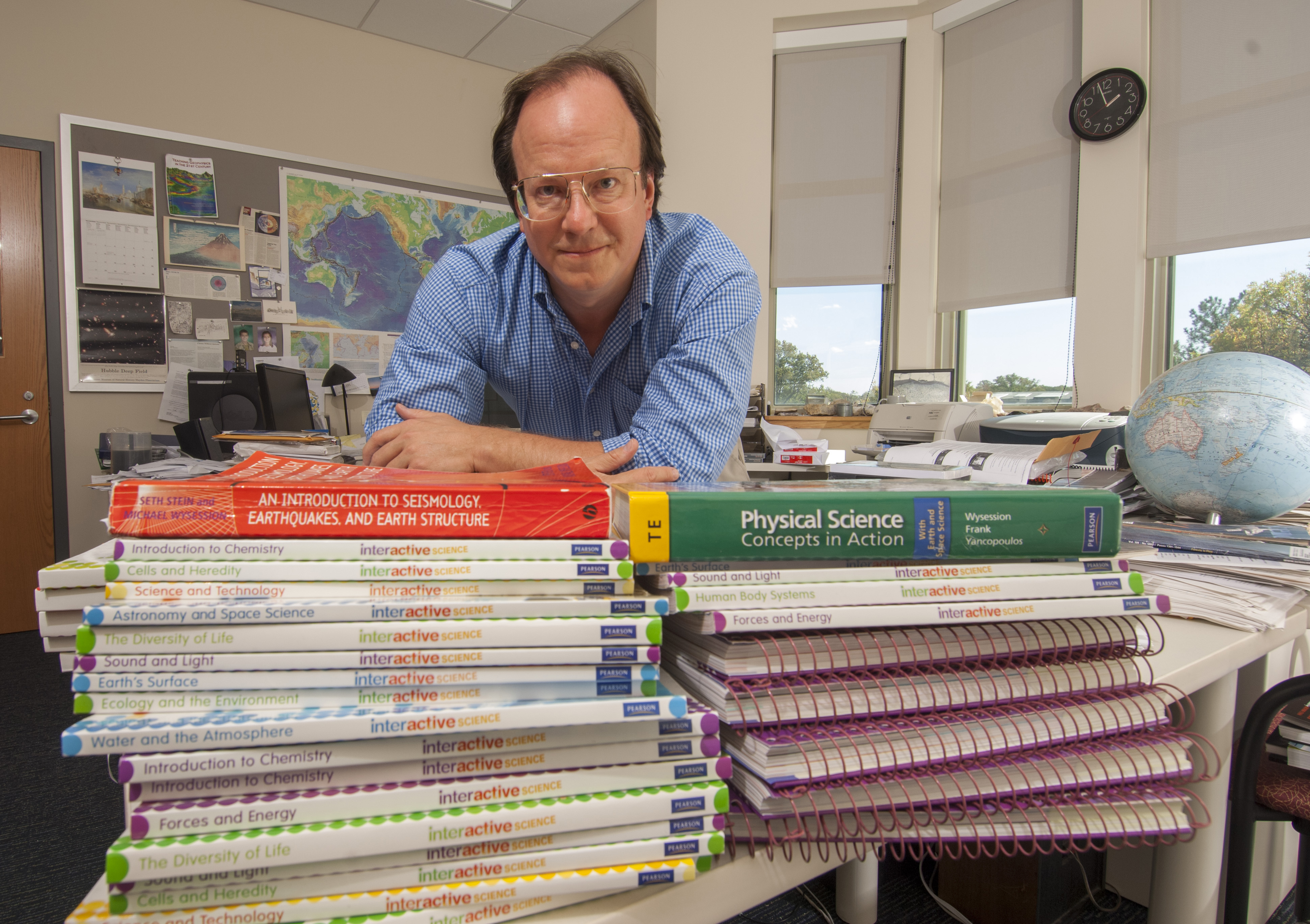
- Wysession Lecturing in 2015
- Born: Michael Edward Wysession; December 6, 1961 (age 64)
- Education: Northwestern University
- Years active: 29
- Website: Web Page of Michael Wysession

Michael E. Wysession (/ˈwaɪsɛʃən/ WYE-sesh-ən); born December 6, 1961) is a professor of Earth and Planetary Sciences at Washington University in St. Louis, and author of numerous science textbooks published by Pearson Education, Prentice Hall and the Savvas Learning Corporation. Wysession has made many contributions to geoscience education and literacy, including chairing the inclusion of Earth and space science in the U.S. National Academy of Science report A Framework for K-12 Science Education and the U.S. K-12 Next Generation Science Standards

== Education and research ==
Wysession earned his B.Sc. from Brown University in 1984 and his Ph.D. in geological sciences at Northwestern University in 1991. His doctoral thesis was entitled Diffracted seismic waves and the dynamics of the core-mantle boundary. He has been on the faculty at Washington University since then. His research has continued to focus on using seismic waves to identify the composition and structure of Earth's mantle, with a special focus on the boundary between the mantle and core. In 1996, Wysession created one of the first maps of the structure of Earth's core-mantle boundary, and in 1999, he created the first accurate computer-generated animation of the way seismic waves propagate through Earth's mantle. An example of his research was the identification with Jesse Lawrence of the lower mantle Beijing Anomaly.

== Leadership ==
Wysession is chair of the National Science Foundation (NSF)-sponsored Earth Science Literacy Initiative, leading a research community-based effort that created a concise document of what all citizens should know about Earth science. He has been active for many years with the leadership of IRIS (Incorporated Research Institutions for Seismology), including serving as chair of the Education and Outreach Program, working to advance global awareness of earthquakes and seismology. Wysession helped to create the NSF program on Computational Infrastructure for Geodynamics. He has been an editor of five scientific journals published by the American Geophysical Union and is currently editor-in-chief of Perspectives of Earth and Space Scientists.

== Textbooks ==
Wysession has authored and co-authored many K-12 textbook programs including the K-8 national science programs Interactive Science and Elevate Science and the high school programs Physical Science: Concepts in Action, Experience Chemistry and Experience Physics. He is also co-author of a leading undergraduate/graduate geophysics textbook with Seth Stein entitled Introduction to Seismology, Earthquakes, and Earth Structure. Wysession is author of three video courses with Wondrium (formerly The Great Courses/The Teaching Company):, How the Earth Works, The World’s Greatest Geological Wonders, National Geographic Polar Explorations and The Science of Energy. He is the designer and instructor of a 3-day course entitled Earth, Moon, and Mars that he presents at different NASA locations. Wysession is a frequent lecturer internationally at teacher organization meetings (such as the National Science Teachers Association), science centers, and other venues.

== Awards ==
For his research, Wysession received a Packard Foundation Fellowship for Science and Engineering (1992) and a National Science Foundation Presidential Early Career Award for Scientists and Engineers (PECASE), awarded at the White House (1996). For his education and outreach, Wysession received the inaugural Ambassador Award from the American Geophysical Union (2014), the Frank Press Service Award from the Seismological Society of America (2016), and the Geosciences in the Media Award from the American Association of Petroleum Geologists (2021).
