= Gordon McBean =

Canadian climatologist

- Alma mater: University of British Columbia; McGill University
- Occupation: Academic, climatologist, official
- Employer: Environment and Climate Change Canada (1970–1988); Environment and Climate Change Canada (1994–2000); University of British Columbia (1988–1994); University of Western Ontario (2000–)
- Awards: Order of Ontario (2011); Patterson Medal (1989); Member of the Order of Canada (2010); Ambassador Award (2015); International Meteorological Organization Prize (2017); 2007 Nobel Peace Prize

Gordon McBean is a Canadian climatologist who serves as chairman of the board of trustees of the Canadian Foundation for Climate and Atmospheric Sciences. He is a professor at the University of Western Ontario and Chair for Policy in the Institute for Catastrophic Loss Reduction. Previously he was the Assistant Deputy Minister of Meteorological Service of Canada.

== Biography ==
Professor McBean was born in British Columbia, Canada. He studied physics at McGill University and obtained a PhD in physics and oceanography from the University of British Columbia (UBC), Vancouver, in 1970.

From 1970 to 1988, McBean was a scientist with Environment Canada. In 1988, he became Professor of Geography and Chair of the Atmospheric Sciences Program and in 1992, Professor of Oceanography and Head of the Department of Oceanography. He returned to Environment Canada as Assistant Deputy Minister from 1994 to 2000, responsible for climate, weather and air quality sciences and services in the federal government.

In 1995, McBean gave a speech to the World Meteorological Organization on global warming. In 2006, McBean, with Andrew Weaver and Ken Denman, authored an open letter, signed by 90 Canadian climate scientists, to Prime Minister Stephen Harper calling for an effective national climate change strategy. The letter was a response to an earlier open letter to Harper from 60 scientists (seven of them climatologists, 19 of them Canadians) arguing against the Kyoto accord and questioning its scientific basis.

In addition to his involvement with the Canadian Foundation for Climate and Atmospheric Sciences, McBean is member of the U.S. National Academy of Sciences partnerships committee and since 2014 president of the International Council for Science (ICSU) (before 2014 member of the environment advisory committee).

In 2018, he was professor in the Departments of Geography, Political Science and Physics at the University of Western Ontario, London, Canada, and is currently Director of Policy Studies at the Institute for Catastrophic Loss Reduction and Co-Director of the Centre for Environment and Sustainability there. He also acts as a mentor for the Loran Scholars Foundation.

== Awards and honours ==
- MSC Patterson Medal, 1989
- CMOS President's Prize
- Environment Canada Jim Bruce Award
- McBean has been a long-standing contributor to the Intergovernmental Panel on Climate Change (IPCC), an organisation that was jointly awarded the 2007 Nobel Peace Prize together with Al Gore.
- In 2010, he was made a Member of the Order of Canada.
- In 2011, he was made a Member of the Order of Ontario.
- In 2015, he received the AGU Ambassador Award and was made a Fellow of the International Union of Geodesy and Geophysics.
- In 2017, he received the International Meteorological Organization Prize, the highest award from the World Meteorological Organisation.
