= Aradhna Tripati =

Geophysicist, earth scientist

- Education: California State University, Los Angeles; University of California, Santa Cruz, PhD, 2002
- Awards: Presidential Early Career Award for Scientists and Engineers
- Scientific career
- Fields: Paleoceanography, Climate Change, Geochemistry
- Workplaces: University of California, Los Angeles
- Thesis: (2002)
- Doctoral advisor: James Zachos
- Website: Research site

Aradhna Tripati is an American geoscientist, climate scientist, and advocate for diversity. She is a professor at the University of California, Los Angeles (UCLA) where she is part of the Institute of the Environment and Sustainability, the Department of Earth, Planetary, and Space Sciences, the Department of Atmospheric and Oceanic Sciences, and the California Nanosystems Institute. She is also the director of the Center for Developing Leadership in Science. Her research includes advancing new chemical tracers for the study of environmental processes and studying the history of climate change and Earth systems. She is recognized for her research on climate change and clumped isotope geochemistry. She studies the evolution of atmospheric carbon dioxide levels and the impacts on temperature, the water cycle, glaciers and ice sheets, and ocean acidity.

== Early life and education ==
Born in Texas, Tripati moved to California at age three with her parents, who had emigrated to the United States from the Fiji Islands. She was raised largely by her mother, a nurse, whom she credits with giving her the support and access to opportunities that have since ensured her success. Tripati went to elementary school and junior high school in the Los Angeles Unified School District. At age 12 she enrolled at California State University, Los Angeles as a full-time student through their Early Entrance Program.

Tripati holds a B.S. in geology from California State University, Los Angeles where she received several awards, including the Aaron Waters Award for outstanding senior in 1996. She received her Ph.D. in Earth Sciences from the University of California, Santa Cruz in 2002 where she worked under the supervision of doctoral advisor James Zachos.

Tripati began her postdoctoral research at the University of Cambridge with a Marshall Sherfield Postdoctoral Fellowship. Over the next eight years as an independent researcher, Tripati received several fellowships: the Comer Abrupt Climate Change Fellowship, the Thomas Neville Research Fellowship in Natural Science at Magdalene College, and a UK National Environmental Research Council (NERC) Fellowship.

== Career and research ==
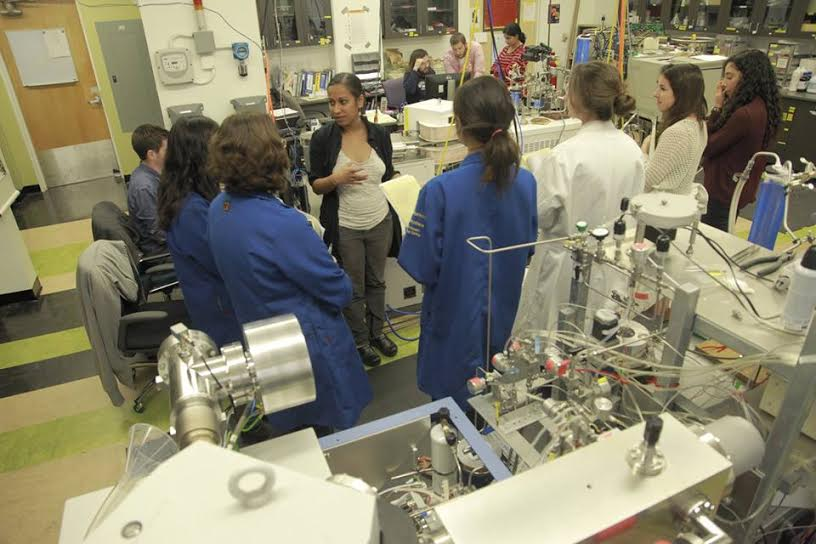
Aradhna Tripati and a group of community college students in one of her research laboratories.

In 2009, Tripati became an assistant professor at UCLA and was subsequently promoted to associate professor in 2014, where she continues to teach full-time. She has joint appointments in the Atmospheric & Oceanic Sciences and Earth, Planetary, & Space Sciences departments and the Institutes of Geophysics & Planetary Physics and Environment & Sustainability.

Since she was an undergraduate student, Tripati has been working on advancing and utilizing state-of-the-art geochemical methods to understand Earth's climate evolution. Over the course of her career, she has applied these methods to better understand the history and patterns of changes in Earth's temperature, carbon cycling, pH, ice volume, and hydrology.

Tripati's laboratory leverages clumped isotope geochemistry as a tool to reconstruct climate norms from the distant past in order to understand the dynamics of climate change over a range of timescales. The primary geochemical method she works with is clumped isotope thermometry, which has led to advancements of its use in the field. She helped develop a technique known as a "paleothermometer," which allows scientists to measure past temperatures by analyzing the chemical ratios of specimens from different time periods. The chemical composition of a particular specimen reflects the composition of the Earth's atmosphere at a given point in time, allowing scientists to understand what the atmosphere was like in the past. Using these techniques in a 2009 study, Tripati and her team were able to find that the last time carbon dioxide levels reached their current level was between 10 and 15 million years ago when the average global temperature was 10˚F warmer than it is today. In a later study published in 2016, Tripati and her colleagues from around the world demonstrated that an ice sheet collapse that took place 14,000 years ago caused the Earth's entire jet stream to shift within a single century. Their results were based on analysis of an ANDRILL-2 drill core that was extracted near the U.S. Antarctic base McMurdo Station. The study suggested that the Antarctic ice sheet may be sensitive to atmospheric carbon dioxide levels that are not far from where they currently reside.

Tripati has also applied her expertise in clumped isotope geochemistry towards determining the body temperatures of dinosaurs that have long been extinct. As a visiting professor at California Institute of Technology, she collaborated on a 2011 study that analyzed the composition of fossilized teeth of Jurassic sauropods to find that their internal body temperature was close to that of most modern mammals, resting somewhere between 36 and 38˚C. Scientists had previously hypothesized that sauropod body temperature was warmer, but their study suggested that these dinosaurs stayed cool by using internal air sacs for ventilation. In a later 2015 study, she and her colleagues analyzed the chemical composition of ancient eggshells to estimate the maternal body temperature of a number of different dinosaurs. Their results, combined with other studies, suggested that dinosaurs aren't simply cold-blooded or warm-blooded, but were somewhere in between. Tripati's most recent research work contributes to finding methodologies that can be used for compilation of climate proxy data across a wide geographic range. Ultimately this work will contribute to creating climate "atlas" which will help understand other climate change models.

In 2014, Tripati received a National Science Foundation CAREER Award to leverage clumped isotopes as a tool to reconstruct terrestrial climates during the Last Glacial Maximum, as well as to support her work recruiting and retaining a diverse research workforce.

== Diversity, equity, and inclusion ==
Tripati engages in activism to promote diversity, equity, and inclusion in the sciences and in the workforce, with a particular focus on addressing the underrepresentation of women, people of color, and other minorities in geoscience, environmental science, and other STEM fields. In July 2017, she launched the UCLA Center for Developing Leadership in Science, which focuses on the intersection between race and environmental science. The center aims to develop a cohort of community-minded scientists with expertise in climate, environmental science, green chemistry, and green engineering who will become leaders.

Tripati organized and wrote a grant proposal that funded a career development workshop for women and minorities at American Geophysical Union (AGU) and served as faculty lead for a program aimed at increasing transfers from community colleges to UCLA. She is involved in the Minorities Striving and Pursuing Higher Education Degrees in Earth System Science group, was a Goldschmidt Geochemistry Society Mentor, is on the advisory board for 500 Women Scientists, and has established two peer mentoring groups on Facebook: Equity and Inclusion in Geoscience and Environmental Science, and the Society for Difficult Women.

Tripati engages youth in the sciences with K-12 outreach programs. She works with high school students and teachers on research projects and she implements an annual project in her UCLA general education oceanography class where students must create educational content for K-12 science teachers. She appeared in a sketch on Jimmy Kimmel that discussed the consensus on human-induced climate change arising from greenhouse gas emissions and in an interview on KCRW's Press Play with Madeleine Brand to answer questions about the realities of climate change.

== Awards and honors ==
Tripati has received a number of awards and recognition for her contributions to research, teaching, and service, including the Presidential Early Career Award in Science and Engineering, the highest honor bestowed by the United States Government on science and engineering professionals in the early stages of their research careers. A partial list includes the following:

- Public Research Award from University of California, Los Angeles (2025)
- Ambassador Award from the American Geophysical Union (2021)
- Willi Dansgaard Award from the American Geophysical Union (2021)
- Fellow of the American Geophysical Union (2021)
- Fellow of the California Academy of Science (2021)
- Royal Society Wolfson Visiting Research Fellowship (2021)
- Geochemical Society and the European Association for Geochemistry Fellow (2021)
- Geological Society of America Fellow (2018)
- Presidential Early Career Award in Science and Engineering (PECASE) from President Obama (2017 announcement)
- Bromery Award, Geological Society of America (2017)
- US National Academy of Sciences Kavli Fellow (2015)
- E. O. Wilson Award for Outstanding Science – on the role of carbon dioxide in climate change (2014)
- Hellman Fellowship (2012–2013)
- Thomas Nevile Fellowship in Natural Sciences, Magdalene College, University of Cambridge (2006–2010)
- Marshall Sherfield Fellowship (2002)

== Selected publications ==
- Tripati A, Darby D. 2018. Evidence for ephemeral middle Eocene to early Oligocene Greenland glacial ice and pan-Arctic sea ice. Nature Communications 9:1038 doi:10.1038/s41467-018-03180-5
- Tripati A, S Sahany, D Pittman, R Eagle, D Neelin, J Mitchell, L Beaufort. 2014. Modern and glacial tropical snowlines controlled by sea surface temperature and atmospheric mixing. Nature Geoscience 7:205-209 doi:10.1038/ngeo2082
- Tripati A, C Roberts, R Eagle. 2009. Coupling of CO_{2} and ice sheet stability over major climate transitions of the last 20 million years. Science 326:1394-1397 doi:10.1126/science.1178296
- Tripati A, H Elderfield. 2005. Deep-sea temperature and circulation changes at the Paleocene-Eocene Thermal Maximum. Science 308:1894-1898 doi:10.1126/science.1109202
- Tripati A, J Backman, H Elderfield, P Ferretti. 2005. Eocene bipolar glaciation associated with global carbon cycle changes. Nature 436:341-346 doi:10.1038/nature03874
- Tripati A, ML Delaney, J Zachos, L Anderson, D Kelly, H Elderfield. 2003. Tropical sea-surface temperature reconstruction for the early Paleogene using Mg/Ca ratios of planktonic foraminifera. Paleoceanography & Paleoclimatology 18:1101 doi:10.1029/2003PA000937.
- Tripati A, RA Eagle, A Morton, JA Dowdeswell, KL Atkinson, Y Bahé, CF Dawber, E Khadun, RM Shaw, O Shorttle, L Thanabalasundaram. 2008. Evidence for glaciation in the Northern Hemisphere back to 44 Ma from ice-rafted debris in the Greenland Sea. Earth and Planetary Science Letters 265(1-2):112-22 doi:10.1016/j.epsl.2007.09.045
