= Kissell =

Kissell is a surname. Notable people with the surname include:

- George Kissell (1920–2008), American baseball player and coach
- John Kissell (1923–1992), American football defensive tackle
- Larry Kissell (born 1951), U.S. Representative for North Carolina
- Rylan Kissell (born 2002), American sport shooter

== See also ==
- Kissel (disambiguation)
