= James Zachos =

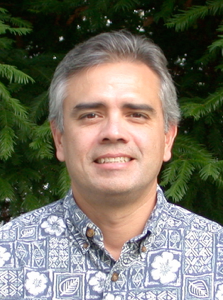
- James Zachos
- Born: California
- Occupations: Oceanographer, paleoclimatologist
- Employer: University of California, Santa Cruz (1993–)
- Awards: Milutin Milankovic Medal (2016); Fellow of the American Association for the Advancement of Science (2021); BBVA Foundation Frontiers of Knowledge Award (2022)

James Zachos is an American paleoclimatologist, oceanographer, and marine scientist. He is currently a professor, emeritus in the Department of Earth and Planetary sciences at University of California, Santa Cruz where he was elected to the National Academy of Sciences in 2017. His research focuses on the biological, chemical, and climatic evolution of late Cretaceous and Cenozoic oceans, and how past climatic conditions help improve forecasts of the consequences of anthropogenic carbon emissions on future climate change.

== Overview ==
Professor Zachos has co-authored over 200 publications and has been invited to give over 140 lectures at institutions, universities, and conferences around the world, including Stanford University, University of Cambridge, and Utrecht University, University of São Paulo, and International Conference on Paleoceanography VIII. He has also participated on multiple Ocean Drilling Program (ODP) Expeditions to the Arctic and Southern Ocean, Pacific and Indian Oceans. In 2003, Zachos served as the co-chief scientist of Leg 208 expedition to the south Atlantic.

Zachos is a fellow of the Geological Society of America, American Academy of Arts and Sciences, and American Geophysical Union. In 2016, he received the Milutin Milankovic Medal by the European Geosciences Union, which is awarded to scientists for their outstanding research in long-term climatic changes and modelling.

== Research ==
Zachos’ research is focused on the biological, chemical, and climatic evolution of late Cretaceous and Cenozoic oceans (i.e., the last 66 million years). This research typically involves analysis of the chemical and isotopic composition of fossil shells from marine sediments to reconstruct past changes ice-volume, ocean temperatures, circulation, productivity, and carbon cycling. Combined with numerical models, such observations are used to determine the mechanisms responsible for the long and short-term changes in global climate. Presently, Zachos’ research group is studying several episodes of rapid and extreme changes in climate, including the Paleocene-Eocene Thermal Maximum.

== Academic Background ==
In 1981 Zachos received bachelor's degrees in Geology and Economics from the State University of New York, Oneonta. Zachos obtained his M.S. in Geology (1983) at The University of South Carolina and a Ph.D. in Geological oceanography at the University of Rhode Island. After completing his education, he pursued a postdoctoral fellowship at University of Michigan from 1988 to 1990 before joining the faculty of the Department of Earth Sciences UC Santa Cruz in 1992. In 2000, he was a visiting fellow at the University of Cambridge.

== Recognition ==
- 2022 - BBVA Foundation Frontiers of Knowledge Award in the category "Climate Change".
- 2018 - Foreign Member, Royal Netherlands Academy of Arts and Sciences
- 2016 - Milutin Milankovic Medal, European Geophysical Union
- 2011 - Fellow, American Academy of Arts and Sciences
