= Jean Bahr =

American hydrogeologist

- Education: Ph.D. Stanford 1987; M.S. Stanford 1985; B.A. Yale 1976
- Scientific career
- Fields: Hydrogeology
- Workplaces: University of Wisconsin Madison 1987 - present; Geoscience Department Chair 2005-2008; Chair of the Water Resources Management Program 1995-1999; Faculty co-director of the undergraduate Women in Science and Engineering Residential Learning Community 2003-2005

Jean Marie Bahr is a hydrogeologist who examines how the physical and chemical composition of groundwater and how that controls the mass transportation of groundwater. She currently is an Emeritus Professor at the University of Wisconsin Madison in the department of geosciences.

== Early life and education ==
Bahr grew up in California and is the daughter of Rudolph R. Bahr and Jane W. Bahr. Her interest in environmental issues peaked in high school where she attended a fair on Earth Day in 1970 at Stanford University.

Bahr earned her Bachelor of Arts in Geology and Geophysics from Yale in 1976. She obtained her Master of Science from Stanford in Applied Earth Sciences (Hydrogeology) in 1985 and earned her Doctor of Philosophy from Stanford in Applied Earth Sciences (Hydrogeology) in 1987.

== Career ==
After earning her Bachelor of Arts from Yale, Bahr served in a geotechnical firm and worked on hydrogeology projects. She worked in Mali, in Western Africa for two years. After her four-year career in this firm, she realized her passion for hydrology and then went to pursue a graduate degree in the field of hydrogeology.

From 1987 up to the present, Bahr has been serving as a faculty member at the University of Wisconsin Madison where she is now an emeritus professor. Bahr has been involved in many aspects of the university, from being the Department Chair of Geosciences from 2005 to 2008, to participating in programs at the University of Wisconsin Madison including the Geological Engineering Program and the Nelson Institute for Environmental Studies. Within the Nelson Institute, Bahr was the chair of the Water Resources Management Program from 1995 to 1999. She also served as faculty co-director of the undergraduate Women in Science and Engineering Residential Learning Community from 2003 to 2005.

== Research ==
Bahr's research focuses on physical, geochemical, and biogeochemical controls on the movement of groundwater. She also looks at solute transport and transformation processes. Bahr also studies core and outcrop studies that show the geochemical properties and hydrological properties of aquifers. She also looks at anthropogenic contaminants in shallow and deeper aquifers as well as groundwater as a resource.

== Other academic positions ==
- Chair of the federal Nuclear Waste Technical Review Board 2017–present
- Editor for the AGU journal Water Resources Research
- President of the Geological Society of America (GSA) 2009-2010
- President of the American Geosciences Institute 2016-2017
