= Jessica Lundquist =

American scientist

Jessica D. Lundquist
- Education: University of California, San Diego
- Scientific career
- Thesis: The pulse of the mountains : diurnal cycles in western streamflow (2004)

Jessica D. Lundquist is a professor at the University of Washington who is known for her work on snow and weather climate forecasting in mountain regions. She was elected a fellow of the American Geophysical Union in 2024.

== Education and career ==
Lundquist earned her B.S. from the University of California, Davis in 1999. She went on to receive an M.S. (2000) and a Ph.D. (2004) from Scripps Institution of Oceanography. Following her Ph.D. Lundquist was a postdoctoral fellow at the Cooperative Institute for Research in Environmental Sciences and the National Oceanic and Atmospheric Administration from 2004 until 2006, when she moved to the University of Washington. Lundquist was promoted to full professor in 2017.

== Research ==
Lundquist is known for her work in snow science. Her early research examined changes in river flow in the United States and used a network of sensors to track snowmelt in Yosemite National Park. Subsequent work includes investigating the process where snow transitions directly from a solid to a gas, sublimation. Lundquist's research examines predictions for the amount of snow a region will get over a season, and defines differences in the amount of snow areas receive across different years. Her work on how forests impact the ability for mountains to retain snow was selected for an editor's choice award from the journal Water Resources Research in 2014.

== Selected publications ==
- Pepin, N. C.; Lundquist, J. D. (2008). "Temperature trends at high elevations: Patterns across the globe". Geophysical Research Letters. 35 (14) 2008GL034026. Bibcode:2008GeoRL..3514701P. doi:10.1029/2008GL034026. ISSN 0094-8276.
- Neiman, Paul J.; Ralph, F. Martin; Wick, Gary A.; Lundquist, Jessica D.; Dettinger, Michael D. (2008-02-01). "Meteorological Characteristics and Overland Precipitation Impacts of Atmospheric Rivers Affecting the West Coast of North America Based on Eight Years of SSM/I Satellite Observations". Journal of Hydrometeorology. 9 (1): 22–47. Bibcode:2008JHyMe...9...22N. doi:10.1175/2007JHM855.1. ISSN 1525-7541.
- Lundquist, Jessica D.; Dickerson-Lange, Susan E.; Lutz, James A.; Cristea, Nicoleta C. (2013). "Lower forest density enhances snow retention in regions with warmer winters: A global framework developed from plot-scale observations and modeling: Forests and Snow Retention". Water Resources Research. 49 (10): 6356–6370. doi:10.1002/wrcr.20504.
- Lundquist, Jessica; Abel, Mimi Rose; Gutmann, Ethan; Kapnick, Sarah (2019). "Our Skill in Modeling Mountain Rain and Snow is Bypassing the Skill of Our Observational Networks". Bulletin of the American Meteorological Society. 100 (12): 2473–2490. Bibcode:2019BAMS..100.2473L. doi:10.1175/BAMS-D-19-0001.1. ISSN 0003-0007.
- Hock, Regine; Rasul, Golam; Adler, Carolina; Cáceres, Bolívar; Gruber, Stephan; Hirabayashi, Yukiko; Jackson, Miriam; Kääb, Andreas; Kang, Shichang (2019-09-25), Kaser, Georg; Mukherji, Aditi (eds.), High Mountain Areas, The Intergovernmental Panel on Climate Change (IPCC)

== Awards and honors ==
In 2008 Lundquist received the Cryosphere Young Investigator Award from the American Geophysical Union. She was elected a fellow of the American Geophysical Union in 2024.
