= Dennis Baldocchi =

American biometeorology scientist

Dennis D. Baldocchi is an American scientist and Distinguished Professor of Biometeorology, Emeritus, in the Department of Environmental Science, Policy and Management at the University of California, Berkeley. He is known for his contributions to the development of the eddy covariance technique, a method used to measure the continuous exchange of carbon dioxide, water vapour, and energy between terrestrial ecosystems and the atmosphere. He is also the co-founder of FLUXNET, an international network that coordinates flux measurements from hundreds of research sites across the globe.

== Early life and education ==
Baldocchi grew up in the Sacramento–San Joaquin Delta region of California. His father was the owner and operator of a walnut and almond orchard, and this early exposure to agriculture and the natural environment shaped his interest in atmospheric science. He received a Bachelor of Science in Atmospheric Sciences from the University of California, Davis in 1977. He then attended the University of Nebraska–Lincoln, where he earned a Master of Science in Agricultural Engineering in 1979 and a Doctor of Philosophy in Bioenvironmental Engineering in 1982. Following his doctorate, he completed a postdoctoral fellowship at the Atmospheric Turbulence and Diffusion Division of the National Oceanic and Atmospheric Administration (NOAA) in Oak Ridge, Tennessee.

== Career ==
After his postdoctoral training, Baldocchi remained at the NOAA Atmospheric Turbulence and Diffusion Division, initially as a biometeorologist with Oak Ridge Associated Universities (1983–1986) and subsequently as a physical scientist with NOAA itself (1986–1999). During this period he conducted research on micrometeorology and the exchange of gases between ecosystems and the atmosphere.

Baldocchi joined UC Berkeley in 1998 as a faculty member in the Department of Environmental Science, Policy and Management (ESPM). He was appointed Distinguished Professor of Biometeorology in 2023 and served as Executive Associate Dean of the Rausser College of Natural Resources from 2022 to 2025, before transitioning to emeritus status in July 2025.

== Research ==
Baldocchi's research focuses on the biological, physical, and chemical processes that govern the exchange of trace gases and energy between terrestrial ecosystems and the atmosphere. The eddy covariance technique is central to this work, allowing scientists to quantify how much carbon dioxide, water, and methane ecosystems absorb or emit over time, providing data that inform understanding of the global carbon cycle and ecosystem responses to climate change.

In the late 1990s, Baldocchi and Italian scientist Riccardo Valentini co-founded FLUXNET, described as an international "network of networks" linking regional flux measurement programmes around the world. The network coordinates the collection and sharing of eddy covariance data from research sites across diverse biomes and climatic zones. Through FLUXNET and the related AmeriFlux programme, a shared database encompasses data from over 400 sites and more than 2,500 site-years, supporting global change research and the validation of land-surface and climate models.

== Honours and awards ==
- He received the Ambassador Award from the American Geophysical Union in 2024 and the Verner Suomi Technology Medal from the American Meteorological Society in 2025.
- In 2025, he held the Carl-Friedrich Gauss Professorship at the Göttingen Academy of Sciences and Humanities in Lower Saxony.
- He is a Fellow of the American Geophysical Union (elected 2007) and a Fellow of the American Meteorological Society (elected 2022).

== Editorial roles ==
Baldocchi served as Editor-in-Chief of the Journal of Geophysical Research: Biogeosciences from 2009 to 2014, and as a member of the editorial review board of Agricultural and Forest Meteorology from 1993 to 2025.
