= Surveys in Geophysics =

- Language: English

Standard abbreviations
- ISO 4: Surv. Geophys.

Indexing
- ISSN: 0169-3298 (print); 1573-0956 (web)

Surveys in Geophysics is an academic journal published by Springer about geophysics. Its editor-in-chief is Michael Rycroft; its 2019 impact factor is 5.544.
