= Ghassem Asrar =

Iranian-American scientist

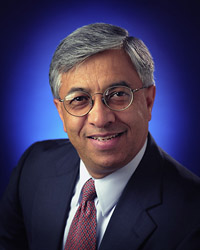
- Born: Shiraz, Iran
- Education: Michigan State University
- Awards: NASA Exceptional Performance Award (1997) NASA Distinguished Service Medal (1999); NASA Medal for Outstanding Leadership (2000) AGU Ambassador Award (2014)
- Scientific career
- Fields: The Earth and Space Systems; Civil Engineering and Environmental Physics; Remote Sensing
- Workplaces: University of Maryland; World Climate Research Program (WCRP); National Aeronautics and Space Administration

Ghassem R. Asrar is an Iranian-American scientist in the field of Earth and space science. Since November 2019 he has served as the Senior Vice President for Science at the Universities Space Research Association.

== Education and early years ==
Asrar was born and raised in Shiraz, Iran in a family where he was the eldest child among nine siblings. He moved to the United States in 1978 to continue his graduate education at Michigan State University.

Asrar earned two master's degrees, in environmental biophysics (MS '78) and civil engineering (MS '81), and an interdisciplinary doctorate degree in the field of environmental physics (Ph.D. '81) at Michigan State University. He conducted research and trained undergraduate and post-graduate students for nine years in academia prior to joining the National Aeronautics and Space Administration (NASA) in 1987.

== Career ==
In 1987 Asrar moved to NASA Headquarters as a Distinguished Visiting Scientist through the California Institute of Technology, Jet Propulsion Laboratory. He developed new programs in remote sensing science and land surface modeling.

From 1992 to 1998 Asrar served as the Chief Scientist for the Earth Observing System (EOS) in NASA's Earth Science Division. In this role he led a team developing scientific priorities and measurement objectives for a series of advanced Earth-orbiting satellites investigating connections between Earth's land, oceans, cryosphere and atmosphere. He established and managed NASA's Earth System Science Interdisciplinary Research, Graduate Fellowship and New Investigators Programs to support training of the next generation of Earth scientists and engineers.

In 1998 Asrar was appointed to the post of Associate Administrator for the NASA Office of Earth Science. During his tenure the Office developed and launched successfully 15 Earth Observing System satellites, and associated data and information management system capabilities. He was subsequently appointed Deputy Administrator of NASA's Science Directorate. In this expanded capacity Asrar oversaw the development and launch of satellites and robotic missions exploring the entire solar system.

In 2006 Asrar left NASA to become Deputy Administrator for Natural Resources and Agricultural Systems with the Agricultural Research Service (ARS) of the U.S. Department of Agriculture.

Asrar became the Director of the World Climate Research Program (WCRP) of the World Meteorological Organization (WMO), Geneva, Switzerland in March 2008, and served in this position until November 2013.

In Dec 2013 Asrar moved to become Director of the Joint Global Research Institute, a partnership between the Pacific Northwest National Laboratory and the University of Maryland.

Most recently in 2019 Asrar was appointed Senior Vice President for Science at the Universities Space Research Association (USRA).

== Awards ==
Asrar has received numerous awards including the NASA Exceptional Performance Award (1987), the NASA Distinguished Service Medal (1999), and the NASA Medal for Outstanding Leadership (2000). Honors

Asrar is a Fellow of the American Geophysical Union (AGU), the American Meteorological Society (AMS) and the Institute of Electrical and Electronics Engineers (IEEE).
