= Susan Joy Hassol =

American author and science communicator

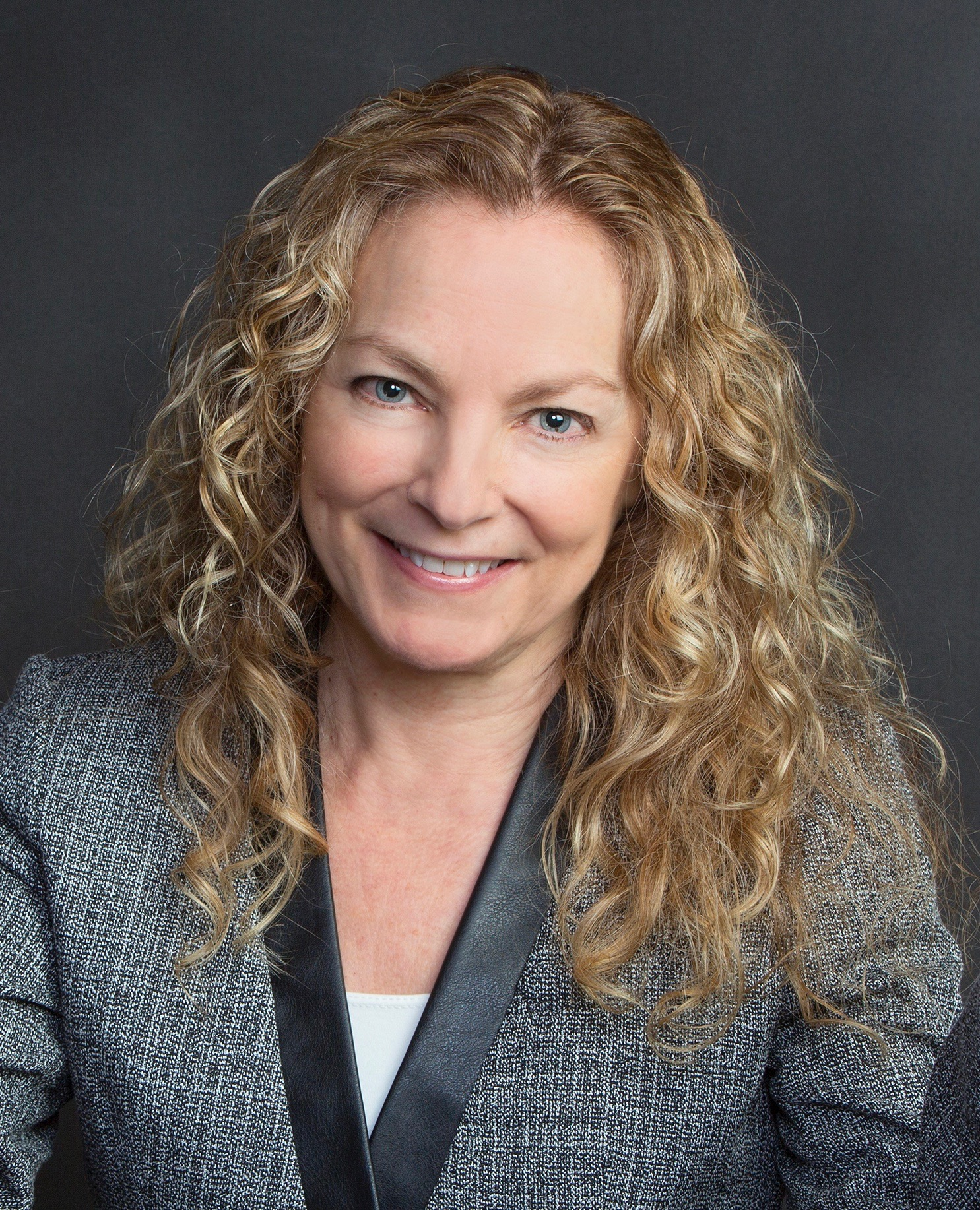
- Education: BS - Syracuse University
- Awards: 2023 Friend of the Planet Award, National Center for Science Education; Ambassador Award and Fellow, American Geophysical Union; Fellow, American Assoc of the Advancement of Science; Climate Science Communication Award (Climate Institute)
- Website: https://climatecommunication.org/

Susan Joy Hassol is an American author and science communicator best known for her work around climate change. Hassol is the Director of Climate Communication and was the Senior Science Writer on the first three U.S. National Climate Assessments.

== Early life and education ==
Susan Hassol was born in January 1959 in Brooklyn, New York to Harriette Hassol, a long time public school teacher, and Edwin Hassol, who worked with his parents in their family furniture store in Brooklyn. The family moved to Long Island where she graduated from Lawrence High School in 1977. She then attended Syracuse University, graduating summa cum laude with a bachelor's degree in Public Communication and Public Affairs in 1981. She worked in energy efficiency at Sun Shares in Durham, NC. She completed one semester of law school at the University of North Carolina in Chapel Hill, but then, inspired by the work of Rocky Mountain Institute on energy efficiency and renewables, she left law school and moved to Aspen, Colorado.

== Career ==
Hassol began working as a contractor for the Rocky Mountain Institute, writing home energy briefs that informed people how to save energy in their homes. She also worked at the Windstar Foundation with John Denver, where she wrote a series of handbooks entitled "Creating a Healthy World," each book addressing greener ways to live with energy, water, recycling, and everyday chemicals, providing readers with simple things they can do in their daily lives to make a difference on the environment. Hassol worked for IRT: The Energy Newsbrief, where she wrote a weekly digest of strategic developments in the energy field. Hassol then went to work at the Aspen Global Change Institute (AGCI), where she received an intensive education on climate change from hundreds of scientists, and synthesized large amounts of scientific information, communicating it in a clear and concise way.

As she continued her career in climate science communication, Hassol's work became policy relevant as she testified to the Senate Commerce Committee, prepared others to testify in front of Congress, authored Impacts of A Warming Arctic, the synthesis report of the Arctic Climate Impact Assessment, and wrote the first three National Climate Assessments in 2000, 2009, and 2014. In 2006, Hassol wrote the HBO documentary Too Hot Not to Handle. In 2015, she gave a TEDx talk discussing climate communication and solutions. Hassol is the director of Climate Communication LLC, and leads workshops for journalists under the National Science Foundation-funded project Climate Matters in the Newsroom, intending to guide journalists in accurately communicating climate impacts and solutions on a local level. She works with many leading climate scientists, including Michael Mann, Katharine Hayhoe, Richard Somerville, and Jerry Melillo. She continues to be an analyst, communicator, and author known for her ability to communicate complex scientific issues in ways that are understandable to the public and policymakers alike.

Hassol continues to work with journalists, scientists, and others to educate them on the importance of framing and word choice - in particular scientists, as to how they can more effectively communicate climate science to non-scientists - through workshops and trainings, interviews, articles, and op-eds. In February 2023, Hassol published the article, "The Right Words Are Crucial to Solving Climate Change" in Scientific American.

Hassol is a Fellow of both the American Association for the Advancement of Science and the American Geophysical Union where she served in the past on the Board of Directors. In 2021, Hassol received the AGU Ambassador Award for her tireless efforts to improve the quality of climate change communication. In 2023, she was named Friend of the Planet by the National Center for Science Education for pioneering the art and science of climate communication.

== Awards and honors ==
- 2023: Received Friend of the Planet award from the National Center for Science Education (NCSE) for pioneering the art and science of climate communication.
- 2021: Honored with the prestigious Ambassador Award from the American Geophysical Union for her tireless efforts to improve communication of climate change science and solutions.
- 2012: Elected Fellow of the American Association of the Advancement of Science (AAAS) for her "exceptional contributions in the area of science communication, particularly for communication of the science of climate change to policymakers and the public."
- 2006: Received the Climate Institute's first ever award for climate science communication

== Selected publications ==
- COP28 has become a shameless exercise in the fight against climate change. But can we afford to walk out?, Hassol and Mann 2023, Los Angeles Times
- For our kids’ sake, it’s time to fix climate change, Hayhoe and Hassol 2023, Houston Chronicle
- This heatwave is a climate omen. But it’s not too late to change course, Mann and Hassol 2023, The Guardian
- Welcome to the apocalyptic haze of the new abnormal. There is nowhere left to hide, Hassol and Mann 2023, Independent
- The Right Words Are Crucial to Solving Climate Change, Hassol 2023, Scientific American
- Enjoy the weather. Worry about the climate., Hassol and Mann 2023, The Hill
- Is there still time for COP27 to hold back climate catastrophe?, Mann and Hassol 2022, Los Angeles Times
- Hurricane Ian is no anomaly. The climate crisis is making storms more powerful, Mann and Hassol 2022, The Guardian
- Heat wave bakes one-third of Americans, highlighting urgency of climate legislation, Hassol and Mann 2022, The Hill
- Now Is Not the Time To Give in to Climate Fatalism, Hassol and Mann 2022, TIME
- Lost time means a steeper climb on climate, Mann and Hassol 2022, The Hill
- Glasgow’s hope at a critical moment in the climate battle, Mann and Hassol 2021, Los Angeles Times
- Let’s emerge from Glasgow still in the fight, Hassol and Mann 2021, Boston Globe
- Three Things We Must Do to Tackle Climate Change, Hassol and Melillo 2021, Scientific American
- America’s Next Great Migrations Are Driven by Climate Change, Khanna and Hassol 2021, Scientific American
- America in 2090: The Impact of Extreme Heat, in Maps, Hassol, Ebi, and Serkez 2021, The New York Times
- That Heat Dome? Yeah, It’s Climate Change., Mann & Hassol 2021, The New York Times
- Climate Trumps Everything, Mann & Hassol 2016, Scientific American
- (Un)Natural Disasters: Communicating Linkages between extreme events and climate change, Hassol, Torok, Lewis, & Luganda, 2016, WMO
- Communicating the Science of Climate Change, Somerville & Hassol 2011, Physics Today
- Improving How Scientists Communicate About Climate Change, Hassol 2011, EOS
- What We Know about the Climate Change-Hurricane Connection Mann, Peterson & Hassol 2017, Scientific American
- Irma and Harvey should kill any doubt that climate change is real Mann, Hassol, Peterson, 2017, Washington Post
- Arctic Climate Feedbacks: Global Implications (Editors: Sommerkorn & Hassol) 2011
