= Robert Duce =

- Born: April 9, 1935 (age 91); Midland, Ontario, Canada
- Citizenship: United States (naturalized), Canada (renounced)
- Education: Baylor University (Undergraduate), Massachusetts Institute of Technology (PhD)
- Known for: Atmospheric and marine chemistry
- Spouse: Mary Elizabeth (Untz) Duce
- Children: Patricia Duce Brown, David Robert Duce
- Awards: AGU Ambassador Award (2017)
- Scientific career
- Fields: Atmospheric Chemistry, Marine Chemistry,
- Workplaces: Texas A&M University
- Thesis: (1964)

Robert A. Duce (born April 9, 1935) is a pioneer in the study of atmospheric chemistry, and a distinguished professor emeritus at Texas A&M University. He has made significant contributions to the understanding of chemical exchanges between the atmosphere and the oceans, and the global cycle of trace elements. Duce received a BS, chemistry (1957) from Baylor University and a PhD in the subject of inorganic and nuclear chemistry (1964) at Massachusetts Institute of Technology, where he was also a post-doctoral fellow. (1965) His thesis title was "Determination of iodine, bromine, and chlorine in the marine atmosphere by neutron activation analysis".

Duce served as assistant, then associate professor of chemistry at the University of Hawaii from 1965 to 1970, when he moved to associate professor of oceanography at the University of Rhode Island. In 1973 he became full professor at the University of Rhode Island, and held that position until 1987, when he was promoted to dean, Graduate School of Oceanography and vice provost for marine affairs. In 1987 he was appointed dean, College of Geosciences and Maritime Studies at Texas A&M University. In 1997 he resigned his position as dean, and remained at Texas A&M University as professor of oceanography and professor of atmospheric sciences. He received the honor of university distinguished professor in 2006. He remains university distinguished professor emeritus, oceanography and atmospheric sciences to the present.

Duce has served with a vast number of national and international organizations, including:

- Member of the Scientific Steering Committee, US GEOTRACES Program, 2009–2013
- Chair United Nations Group of Experts on the Scientific Aspects of Marine Environmental Protection (GESAMP), 2000–2002
- Chair of the National Academy of Sciences/ National Research Council Ocean Studies Board, from 2012–present.

He was the recipient of a festschrift in 2013, the American Meteorological Society 2013 Robert A. Duce Symposium.
