= Canadian Foundation for Climate and Atmospheric Sciences =

Climatological research organization

The Canadian Foundation for Climate and Atmospheric Sciences (CFCAS) was Canada's main funding body for university-based research on climate, atmospheric, and related oceanic work. It is now the Canadian Climate Forum. As an autonomous, charitable foundation established in 2000, CFCAS funded research that improved the scientific understanding of processes and predictions, provided relevant science to policy makers, and improved understanding of the ways in which these challenges affect human health and the natural environment in addition to strengthening Canada's scientific capacity. Its chair is Gordon McBean.

CFCAS fosters partnerships in support of innovation, investment, policy, skills development, and service delivery. It funds the generation of new knowledge that is essential to the competitiveness of industries and to the health and safety of Canadians. The foundation has invested over $117 million in university-based research related to climate and atmospheric sciences, in 24 collaborative networks, two major initiatives, and 158 projects. Several of the networks are linked to international research programs; all involved multiple partners. Complementary (leveraged) support for networks has doubled the resources available to them. The Foundation has also hosted or co-hosted a number of workshops and symposia on topics such as extreme weather and Arctic climate, and provides support to international project offices.

== Research ==
Research funded by CFCAS informs decision- and policy-makers in government and industry, including those working in:

- Municipalities – for building regulations; emergency planning; snow clearing
- Energy Industry – for load forecasting; pipeline routing; pricing
- Health sector – for anticipating flu/allergy seasons; tracking spread of toxins, pollutants or new diseases
- Transportation industry – for plane de-icing; aviation routing; ship loads
- Resource industries – for winter roads, selection of disease resistant species for reforestation planning, water stewardship
- Financial services industry – for insurance rates; trade in weather derivatives
- Tourist industry – for seasonal planning at resorts; hazard management; cruise routes
- Sovereignty – for security infrastructure; siting of bases and support structures
- Agriculture – for crop choices; pest control, tilling techniques
- Weather services – for storm alerts, regional forecasts, anticipating severe events

== See also ==
- Experimental Lakes Area
