= Catherine Kissel =

French geophysicist

Catherine Kissel (born 1958) is a French geophysicist whose research concerns environmental magnetism and paleomagnetism and its applications to plate tectonics, paleoclimatology, and paleoceanography. She is a research scientist in the Laboratoire des sciences du climat et de l'environnement (LSCE), a joint research laboratory of the French National Centre for Scientific Research (CNRS) and French Alternative Energies and Atomic Energy Commission (CEA).

== Education and career ==
After studies in geology and biology at Paris-Sud University from 1977 to 1982, Kissel received a doctorat de troisième cycle in 1984, with a thesis on paleomagnetism in the Aegean Sea directed by Carlo Laj. She completed a doctorat d'état in 1986.

She has been a researcher with LSCE since 1987. From 1997 to 2007 she headed the Environmental Magnetism research group, from 2008 to 2011 she headed the ChronoMag research group, and since 2015 she has headed the Climate and Magnetism research group.

== Recognition ==
Kissel was elected to Academia Europaea in 2019. She was the 2019 recipient of the Petrus Peregrinus Medal of the European Geosciences Union, in recognition of her "outstanding contributions in palaeomagnetism, applied to understanding the Earth’s magnetic field, palaeoclimate, palaeoceanography and the geodynamic evolution of the Mediterranean margins".
