= Constance I. Millar =

American research ecologist

- Education: University of California, Berkeley, Ph.D. Genetics (1985) University of California, Berkeley, M.S. Wildland Resources Science (1979) University of Washington, B.S. Forest Science (1977)
- Awards: 1991 Pew Marine Fellow, Conservation and the Environment 2009 Forest Service Deputy Chief's Distinguished Science award 2019 American Geophysical Union’s Ambassador Award
- Scientific career
- Fields: Research Ecology, Genetics
- Website: https://www.fs.fed.us/psw/programs/efh/staff/millar/

Constance I. Millar is an American research ecologist working for the United States Forest Service at the Pacific Southwest Research Station in Berkeley, California. Her work focuses on the effects of climate change on high-elevation ecosystems in both the past and the present. She has also developed ways to evolve management techniques of forest ecosystems to improve the ability to protect them against climate change.

== Early life and education ==
Millar attended the University of Washington for her undergraduate degree. Here, she received a Bachelor's of Science in Forest Science in 1977. Following this, she earned a Master's Degree in Forest Genetics from the University of California at Berkeley in 1979. She then earned a Ph.D. in Genetics from UC Berkeley in 1985. Here, at the University of California, Millar formed the California Forest Germplasm Conservation Project in 1985. This project allowed Millar and her peers to conduct research on a range of tree species native to California through grants given by the California State Environmental Protection Program. During her summers off from college, she had worked on the Willamette River as a seasonal wilderness ranger.

== Career and research ==
=== Positions ===
In 1987, two years after Millar had completed her Doctoral work, she began working at the Pacific Southwest Research Station where she still works to this day. Millar is also a chair of CIRMOUNT: The Consortium for Integrated Climate Research in Western Mountains. CIRMOUNT is an organization founded by Millar and her colleagues in 2004 which aims to serve as a medium for researchers studying mountains of western North America to collaborate with each other and further scientific understanding of how climate change is affecting their ecosystems.

She is also a lead operative of the North American Global Observation Initiative in Alpine Environments (GLORIA) Great Basin Chapter, which she founded in 2004 through her involvement in CIRMOUNT. Through GLORIA Great Basin, Millar researches the climate change-induced movement of Californian and Nevadan alpine plant species in a prescribed manor created by International GLORIA, which is based in Vienna, Austria.

=== Research ===
Millar's research is focused on the effects of climate change and its impact on various aspects of temperate forests and alpine ecosystems. Much of her work has been concentrated on conifers of the Great Basin, such as Pinus flexilis, Juniperus osteosperma, and Pinus longaeva, and their reactions to changes in climate. Additionally, she has begun innovative research on the rock glaciers of the Great basin. Through this work she has quantified the volume of water stored as ice in the Great Basin. Millar frequently conducts research on American pikas (Ochotona princeps) and how they adapt to climate change. She has learned that Americans pikas will be able to withstand a wider range of climates than previously thought, by taking advantage of subsurface habitats. In addition, she has identified ways to more effectively manage forests by incorporating the inevitable change of climate into conservation strategies used by forest management teams.

== Awards and honors ==
- Pew Marine Fellow, Conservation and the Environment, 1991 This fellowship was awarded to Millar to facilitate her ambitions in developing management strategies for forests.
- Forest Service Deputy Chief's Distinguished Science award, 2009 Millar was awarded for her work in developing techniques to more effectively manage forest ecosystems to protect them from climate change.
- American Geophysical Union’s Ambassador Award, 2019 The American Geophysical Union honored Millar for her leadership in the field and the promotion of organizations aimed at preserving the environment.

== Notable publications ==
- Millar, C. I., Stephenson, N. L. and Stephens, S. L. (2007), 'Climate change and forests of the future: managing in the face of uncertainty.' Ecological Applications, 17: 2145-2151. doi:10.1890/06-1715.1
- Constance I. Millar & Robert D. Westfall (2019) Geographic, hydrological, and climatic significance of rock glaciers in the Great Basin, USA, Arctic, Antarctic, and Alpine Research, 51:1, 232-249, DOI: 10.1080/15230430.2019.1618666
- Constance I. Millar, David A. Charlet, Robert D. Westfall, John C. King, Diane L. Delany, Alan L. Flint, Lorraine E. Flint. 'Recruitment patterns and growth of high-elevation pines in response to climatic variability (1883–2013), in the western Great Basin, USA.' Canadian Journal of Forest Research, 2018, 48(6): 663-671, doi:10.1139/cjfr-2017-0374
- Millar, Constance I., and Nathan L. Stephenson. 'Temperate Forest Health in an Era of Emerging Megadisturbance.' Science 21 Aug. 2015: 823–826.
- Millar, Constance I., and Wallace B. Woolfenden. 'The Role of Climate Change in Interpreting Historical Variability.' Ecological Applications 9.4 (1999): 1207–1216.
