= Nexus Tools Platform =

Nexus Tools Platform (NTP)
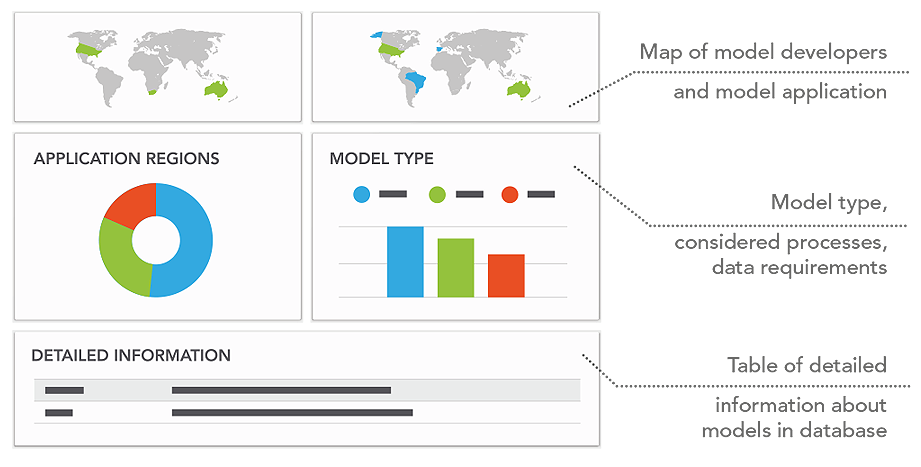
- Simplified overview of the NTP functionality

Description
- Type of site: Information site
- Launched: April 2015
- Owner: UNU-FLORES
- Website: http://data.flores.unu.edu/projects/ntp
- Number of models: 85 (March 2019)
- Current status: Active

The Nexus Tools Platform or NTP is a web-based inventory platform that allows an interactive comparison of environmental models in a statistical way. Developed by the UNU Institute for Integrated Management of Material Fluxes and of Resources (UNU-FLORES), the platform helps a user to analyze existing modelling tools related to environmental resource management and associated nexus perspectives, such as a Water-Energy-Food Nexus. As a result, the user can select the most appropriate tools to fit the research needs.

== Integrated Resources Management (Nexus Approach) ==
Considering an increase in the global population, the demand for both food and water is expected to grow by more than 50% by 2050. At the same time, agricultural activity already puts significant stress on the quantity and quality of soils and freshwater resources worldwide. This leads to growing rates of land degradation and ecosystem deterioration.

Long-term solutions to those challenges require integrated management of environmental resources which can be also referred to as a Nexus Approach. This approach focuses on the synergies between sectors in order to minimize trade-offs, increase resource use efficiency, and improve environmental policy & governance which is crucial for the achievement of the Sustainable Development Goals.

For example, the sustainable management of wastewater in crop production is considered as an implementation of a Water-Soil-Waste Nexus.

== Mission ==
Integrated resource management requires the use of integrated environmental modelling tools. However, there is no single model that can cover all complex interactions between natural resources such as water, soil, and waste. Moreover, there is a poor awareness of the available models and their capabilities which results in a time-consuming process of developing new models instead of using or further expanding already existing ones.

With the objective of addressing the abovementioned problems, the Nexus Tools Platform has been created. It provides detailed visualizations of model descriptions and advanced filtering options using Kibana open-source visualization software. The platform does not attempt to include all possible models, but rather to provide a more efficient way to compare well-established ones and to keep the content updated through the feedback system with model users and developers.

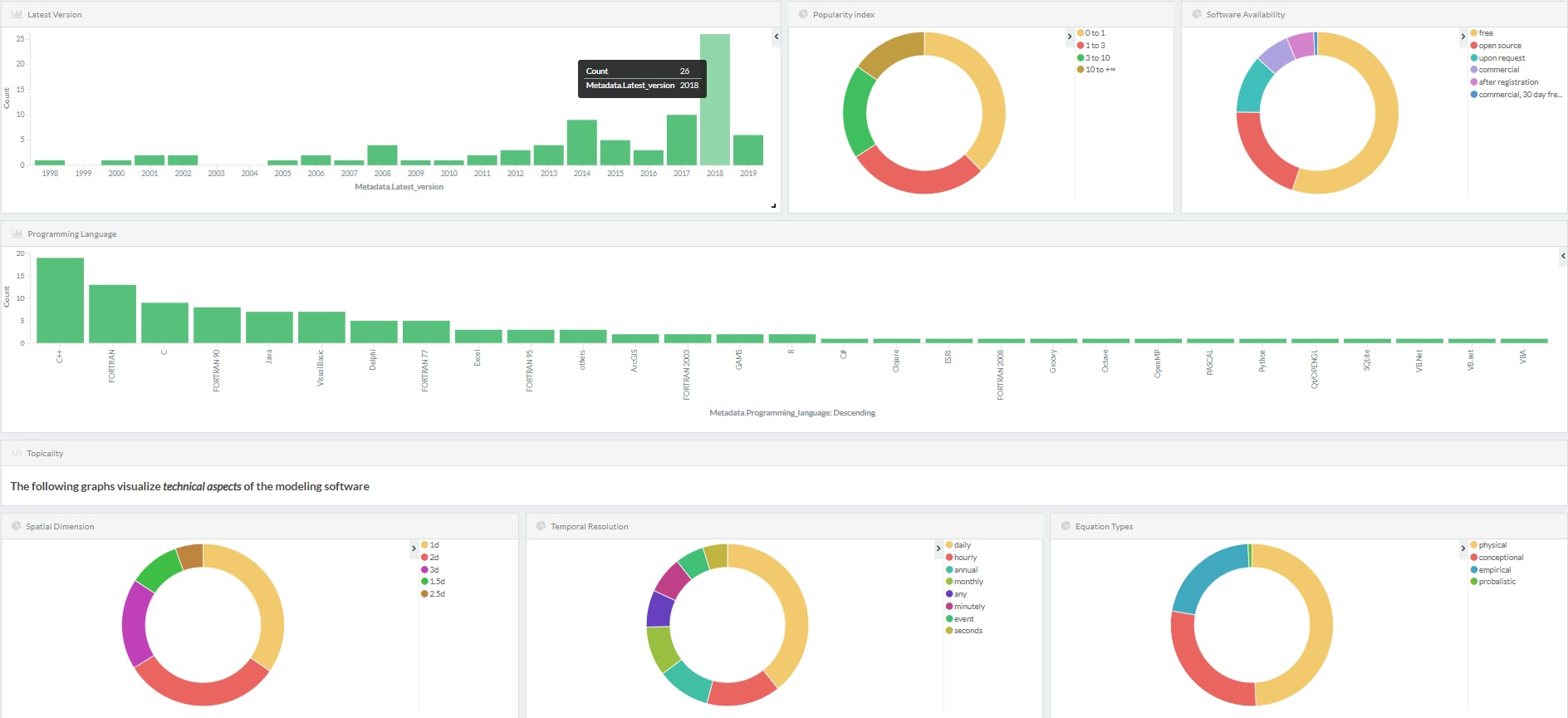
The screenshot of the Nexus Tools Platform visualization (March 2019)

== History ==
The first version of the website was published in April 2015 starting with the database of 60 models from around the world. A year later, a paper was published in Environmental Modelling & Software journal explaining the NTP development, data collection methodology, and application examples. In March 2018, NTP 2.0 was released with a greater number of available models (84), improved classification and visualization. Through the advanced search and filter functions, users could differentiate modelling tools in terms of model types, popularity, considered processes, input and output parameters, application areas (countries), programming language, etc. Recently, the whole database was refreshed and one more model was added making 85 in total.

== Data Sources ==
The data for the platform is collected in two ways:

- The open access information which is available on the respective model websites, manuals, and publications. This information is further processed to fit the NTP classification system;
- The information provided directly by the model developers.

The current list of models includes a wide array of research areas from hydrology and land management to soil and water quality topics from a local to global scale. Some of the most popular examples are SWAT, MODFLOW, HEC-RAS, and CESM.

The NTP is not intended to promote any of the models listed on the website. The information, whether in graphical or text form, is presented for scientific and educational purposes only.

== See also ==
- UNU-FLORES
- United Nations University (UNU)
- Water, energy and food security nexus
