= Edeltraud Günther =

German economist

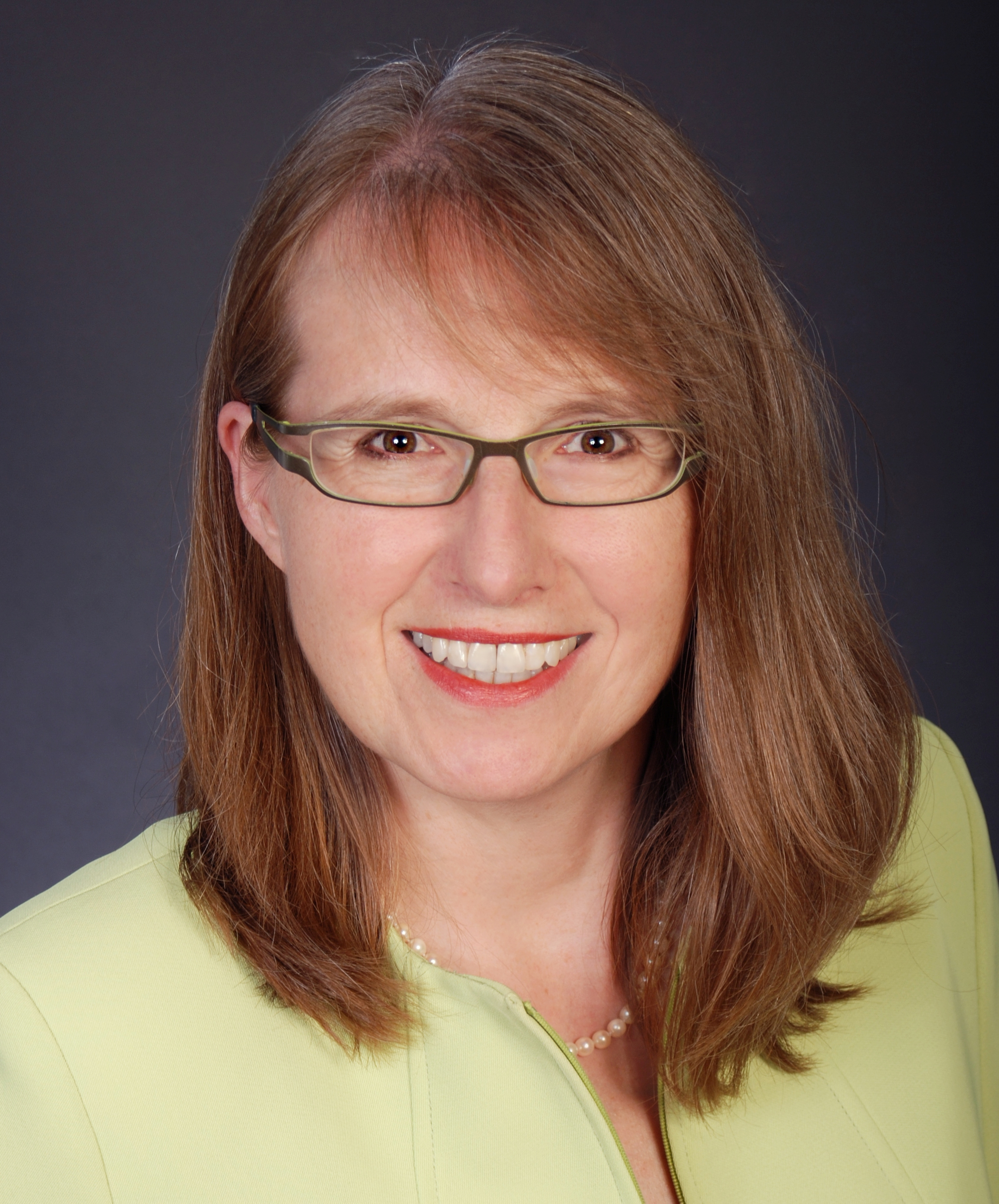
Günther in 2013

Edeltraud 'Edel' Günther (born October 10, 1965, in Augsburg) is a German business and sustainability assessment researcher, and university educator. Günther is currently the Director of the United Nations University Institute for Integrated Management of Material Fluxes and of Resources (UNU-FLORES) while on leave from the Technische Universität Dresden, where she has held the Chair of Business Management, esp. Sustainability Management and Environmental Accounting since 1996. She has also undertaken multiple international visiting professorships, and is the founding member of the Centre for Performance and Policy Research in Sustainability Measurement and Assessment (PRISMA).

== Career ==
Günther received her Diploma of Business Administration from the University of Augsburg, where she specialised in Accounting and Auditing, Finance, and Operations Research from 1984 to 1989. She also studied Languages at the École de Traduction et d`Interprétation of the University of Geneva. From 1989 to 1994, she worked as a research assistant at the Chair of Accounting and Control at the University of Augsburg (Prof. Dr. Dres. h.c. A.G. Coenenberg) and undertook her doctorate to a Dr. rer. pol. with the dissertation topic, "Ökologieorientiertes Controlling" (Environmental Management Control). From 1994 to 1996, she was a research assistant and project leader in the Economics Department of the Bavarian Institute of Applied Environmental Research and Technology GmbH (BIfA) in Augsburg.

In 1996, Günther was appointed Chair of Business Management, esp. Sustainability Management and Environmental Accounting, at the Faculty of Business and Economics at the TU Dresden - a position she holds to this day. Under the leadership of Günther, the TU Dresden implemented an environmental management system according to EMAS (being the first German university of technology to do so), which has been regularly validated since 2002. Günther founded and now leads the Centre for Performance and Policy Research In Sustainability Measurement and Assessment PRISMA.

On 1 September 2018, Prof. Edeltraud Günther took up the position of Director at the United Nations University Institute for Integrated Management of Material Fluxes and of Resources (UNU-FLORES). Launched in 2012, the Dresden-based institute of the United Nations University develops strategies to promote the sustainable use and integrated management of environmental resources such as water, soil, and waste. To accommodate this appointment, Günther has been granted a leave of absence by the TU Dresden. As part of strengthening the connections between UNU-FLORES and the wider United Nations network, Günther was one of the establishing Directors and the first chair for the UNU Water Network, which was initiated in 2019. In 2020, she was appointed UNU Focal Point for the Environmental Management Group (EMG).

Günther was a visiting professor at the McIntire School of Commerce at the University of Virginia, Charlottesville, U.S.A. from August 2001 to February 2002, and later, from December 2005 to May 2016. In January 2015, she was a visiting professor at Kobe University, Kobe, Japan, and in the summer semester of 2017, a visiting professor at the NUST – Namibia University of Science and Technology.

== Research emphasis ==
In her research, Günther works on ecological problems in economics, including environmental and sustainability performance, risk management, obstacle analysis, sustainable management, value-based management, as well as deceleration.

== Memberships ==
Edeltraud Günther is chairwoman of the DIN-working group for the development of the international standard DIN EN ISO 14051 “Material flow cost accounting” as well as ISO 14008 “Monetary valuation of environmental impacts from specific emissions and use of natural resources – Principles, requirements and guidelines” (since 2008). From 2008 to 2013 she was leader of the "Arbeitskreises Nachhaltige Unternehmensführung" (working group sustainable management) in the Schmalenbach-Gesellschaft für Betriebswirtschaft e.V. She is a member of the working group "Green Controlling" in the Internationaler Controllerverein e.V. (since 2013) and in the working group Integrated Reporting in the Schmalenbach-Gesellschaft für Betriebswirtschaft e.V. (since 2013). Furthermore, she is a member of the DFG – Senate Commission on Water Research (2006 to 2011 and since 2015), member of the expert forum "Nachhaltiges Wirtschaften" (sustainable management) in the Hightech Forum (since 2015), member of the Class of Engineering Sciences of the Saxonian Academy of Sciences and Humanities in Leipzig (since 2014), as well as member of the Commission of Sustainability Management in the Verband der Hochschullehrer für Betriebswirtschaft e. V. (since1994).

Günther is editor of the Zeitschrift für Umweltpolitik und Umweltrecht ZfU (since 2009), Sustainable Production and Consumption (since 2015), Umweltwirtschaftsforum (since 2015) and subject editor of the International Journal of Life Cycle Assessment (since 2016). Günther was an expert reviewer for the IPCC-reports.

== Awards (selection) ==
Best Paper Award of the Global Innovation and Knowledge Academy (2015), Highly commended Award of the Emerald LiteratiNetwork (2011), second award "plus energy house" with e-mobility (open interdisciplinary design competition for universities in cooperation with planning offices) (2011), B.A.U.M.-Umweltpreis (Environmental Award) in the category science (2008), Teaching Award for the development of the teaching concept "investing in a sustainable future" for the Procter & Gamble competition for the development of innovative Curricula (2005, together with Mark A. White).

== Publications (selection) ==
For a comprehensive and continuously updated list of publications, please see Professor Günther's profile on Google Scholar

=== Books ===
- Günther, E., & Steinke, K.-H.(Eds.). 2016. CSR und Controlling – Unternehmerische Verantwortung als Gestaltungsaufgabe des Controlling. Berlin: Springer Gabler.
- Günther, E., & Bassen, A. (Eds.). 2016. Integrated Reporting – Grundlagen, Implementierung, Praxisbeispiele. Stuttgart: Schäffer-Poeschel.
- Günther, E., & Ruter, R. X. (Eds.). 2015. Grundsätze nachhaltiger Unternehmensführung. Erfolg durch verantwortungsvolles Management. (2., neu bearbeitete Auflage). Berlin: Erich Schmidt Verlag.
- Günther, E. 2008. Ökologieorientiertes Management: Um-(weltorientiert) Denken in der BWL. Stuttgart: Lucius & Lucius.
- Günther, E., Kaulich, S., Scheibe, L., Uhr, W., Heidsiek, C., & Froehlich, J. (Eds.). 2006. Leistung und Erfolg im betrieblichen Umweltmanagement die Software EPM-KOMPAS als Instrument für den industriellen Mittelstand zur Umweltleistungsmessung und Erfolgskontrolle, inklusive CD-ROM mit einer Einführung in die Software EPM-KOMPAS. Lohmar: EUL Verlag.
- Günther, E. 1994. Ökologieorientiertes Controlling. Konzeption eines Systems zur ökologieorientierten Steuerung und empirischen Validierung. München: Vahlen Verlag.

=== Papers ===
- Herrmann, J., & Guenther, E., 2017. Exploring a scale of organizational barriers for enterprises' climate change adaptation strategies. Journal of Cleaner Production, in press. (VHB-JOURQUAL: B, HB: 0,3). doi: 10.1016/j.jclepro.2017.03.009
- Guenther, E., Endrikat, J., & Guenther, T., 2016. Environmental management control systems: a conceptualization and a review of the empirical evidence. Journal of Cleaner Production, 136(A): 147–171. (VHB-JOURQUAL: B, HB: 0,3) doi:10.1016/j.jclepro.2016.02.043
- Rosen, Richard A., & Guenther, E., 2016. The energy policy relevance of the 2014 IPCC Working Group III report on the macro-economics of mitigating climate change. Energy Policy, 93: 330–334. (VHB-JOURWUAL: B, HB: 0,4). doi:10.1016/j.enpol.2016.03.025
- Guenther, E., Guenther, T., Schiemann, F., & Weber, G., 2016. Stakeholder Relevance for Reporting: Explanatory Factors of Carbon Disclosure. Business and Society, 55(3): 361–397. (VHB-JOURQUAL: B, HB: 0,3). doi:10.1177/0007650315575119
- Bergmann, A., Stechemesser, K. & Guenther, E., 2016. Natural Resource Dependence Theory: Impacts of Extreme Weather Events on Organizations. Journal of Business Research. 69(4): 1361–1366. (VHB-JOURQUAL: B, HB: 0,4)
- Guenther, E., Guenther, T., Schiemann, F., & Weber, G., 2016. Stakeholder Relevance for Reporting: Explanatory Factors of Carbon Disclosure. Business and Society, 55(3): 361–397. (VHB-JOURQUAL: B, HB: 0,3). doi:10.1177/0007650315575119
- Guenther, E., Endrikat, J., & Guenther, T., 2016. Environmental management control systems: a conceptualization and a review of the empirical evidence. Journal of Cleaner Production, 136(A): 147–171. (VHB-JOURQUAL: B, HB: 0,3) doi:10.1016/j.jclepro.2016.02.043
- Hueske, A.-K., Endrikat, J. & Guenther, E., 2015. External environment, the innovating organization, and its individuals: A multilevel model for identifying innovation barriers accounting for social uncertainties. Journal of Engineering and Technology Management, 35: 45–70. (VHB-JOURQUAL: C, HB: 0,4)
- Rieckhof, R., Bergmann, A. & Guenther, E., 2015. Interrelating material flow cost accounting with management control systems to introduce resource efficiency into strategy. Journal of Cleaner Production, 108(B): 1262–1278. (VHB-JOURQUAL: B, HB: 0,3).
- Trumpp, C., Endrikat, J., Zopf, C. & Guenther, E., 2015. Definition, Conceptualization, and Measurement of Corporate Environmental Performance: A Critical Examination of a Multidimensional Construct. Journal of Business Ethics, 126(2):185–204. (VHB-JOURQUAL: B, HB: 0,5)
- Rosen, R. & Guenther, E., 2014. The economics of mitigating climate change: What can we know? Technological Forecasting and Social Change. (VHB-JOURQUAL: B, HB: 0,4)
- Guenther, E. & Hoppe, H., 2014. Merging Limited Perspectives: A Synopsis of Measurement Approaches and Theories of the Relationship between Corporate Environmental and Financial Performance. Journal of Industrial Ecology, 18 (5): 689–707. (VHB-JOURQUAL: A, HB: 0,4)
- Guenther, E., Hueske, A.-K., Stechemesser, K., Buscher, L. 2013. The „Why Not“-Perspective of Green Purchasing: A Multi Level Case Study Analysis. Journal of Change Management, 13 (4): 407–423. (VHB-JOURQUAL: C)
- Günther, E., & White, M. 2013. Investing in a Sustainable Future – Innovative Lehrkonzepte für Nachhaltigkeitskompetenzen. Die Unternehmung, 67(2): 154–169. (VHB-JOURQUAL: C)
- Nowack, M., Endrikat, J., & Guenther, E. 2011. Review of Delphi-based scenario studies: Quality and design considerations. Technological Forecasting and Social Change, 78(9): 1603–1615. (VHB-JOURQUAL: B, HB: 0,5)
- Günther, E., & Kaulich, S. 2005. The EPM-KOMPAS: an Instrument to Control the Environmental Performance in Small and Medium-sized Enterprises (SMEs). Business Strategy and the Environment, 14(6): 361–371. (VHB-JOURQUAL: B, HB: 0,2)
- Günther, E., & Wittmann, R. 1995. Kondukte. Die Betriebswirtschaft, 55(1): 119–120. (VHB-JOURQUAL: C, HB: 0,1)
- Günther, E., & Wagner, B. 1993. Ökologieorientierung des Controlling. Öko-Controlling. Die Betriebswirtschaft, 53(2): 143–166. (VHB-JOURQUAL: C, HB: 0,1)

== Literature ==
- Dorit Petschel (Bearb.): Die Professoren der TU Dresden 1828–2003. Böhlau Verlag, Cologne / Weimar / Vienna 2003, p. 302.
