= Haldern (Rheinland) station =

Railway station in Rees, Germany

Haldern (Rheinland)

General information
- Location: Haldern, Rees, NRW; Germany
- Coordinates: 51°46′21″N 6°27′22″E
- Line: Arnhem-Oberhausen railway
- Platforms: 2
- Tracks: 2

Construction
- Accessible: Yes

Other information
- Fare zone: VRR: 794
- Website: www.bahnhof.de

Services
Preceding station	VIAS	Following station
Empel-Rees towards Arnhem Centraal	RE 19	Mehrhoog towards Düsseldorf Hbf
Location
- Location within North Rhine-Westphalia

Haldern is a railway station in Haldern, North Rhine-Westphalia, Germany. The station is located on the Arnhem-Oberhausen railway. The train services are operated by VIAS.

== Train services ==
The station is served by the following services:

- Regional services RE 19 Arnhem - Emmerich - Wesel - Oberhausen - Duisburg - Düsseldorf

== Bus services ==
- 63 (Millingen - Empel-Rees - Haldern - Wesel)
- 95 (Rees - Haldern - Wertherbruch - Loikum - Bocholt)
