= Master of the Lippborg Passion =

Westphalian artist

The Master of the Lippborg Passion (German: Meister der Lippborger Passion) was a Westphalian artist active in the late Gothic style during the late 15th-century. His name is taken from an altarpiece depicting the Passion that once stood in the church of Lippborg, and is now kept in the Westphalian State Museum of Art and Cultural History in Münster. It is believed that the artist was familiar with the work of Johann von Soest, and shows as well the influence of the Master of the Schöppingen Altarpiece. Another major work by the same hand is the altar of the hohnekirche in Soest, dated to around 1480. A triptych in the church of Sünninghausen and a painting in the church at Lünen are also believed to be by him.
