= Yuasa Phenomenon =

Theory on scientific activity

The Yuasa Phenomenon, named after Japanese physicist and science historian Mitsutomo Yuasa (sometimes referred to as Mintomo Yuasa), suggests that, in the modern era, the world center of scientific activity (defined as producing more than 25% of the world's scientific achievements) moves from one country to another about every 80–100 years.

== Analysis ==
Analyzed data indicate that the "modern world science centre has shifted from Italy (1504–1610) to the United Kingdom (1660–1750), to France (1760– 1840), to Germany (1875–1920), and to the United States (1920 to the present)."

This phenomenon and its study methodology are an emerging scientometrics study area. Indicators point to China's rise as a world center of scientific activity. This phenomenon is also described by other names, including "the Bernal—Yuasa phenomenon".

Shigeo Minowa links Yuasa's finding to Joseph Ben-David's movements of Centers of Learning.

Ben-David's Centers of Learning migration observations are discussed in various works.

== See also ==
- Historic recurrence
- History of science
