= Gerhard Geise =

German mathematician

Gerhard Paul Geise (2 January 1930, Stendal – 11 April 2010, Dresden) was a German mathematician and professor of pure mathematics.

He died after a long serious illness in Dresden.

== Works (selection) ==
- 1961: Über ähnlich-veränderliche ebene Systeme
- 1976: Senkrechte Projektion
- 1977: Kegelschnitte, Kugel und Kartenentwürfe
- 1979: Grundkurs lineare Algebra
- 1980: Analytische Geometrie für Kristallgitter
- 1991: Berührungskegelschnitte in Bézierdarstellung
- 1994: Darstellende Geometrie
- 1995: Analytische Geometrie

== Literature ==
- Geise, Gerhard. In Dorit Petschel (Bearb.): Die Professoren der TU Dresden 1828–2003. Böhlau Verlag, Köln / Weimar / Vienna 2003, pp. 262–263.
