= Johann von Soest =

Johannes von Soest or Johann von Soest may refer to:

- Johann von Soest (painter)
- Johannes von Soest, or Johann Steinwert von Soest, poet
