= Shigeo Minowa =

Shigeo Minowa (1926 – 30 August 2013) was a prominent figure in the world of scholarly book publishing, book culture studies, higher education, and international communication. He is best known for his role in establishing and managing the University of Tokyo Press, his contributions to international publishing, and his efforts in promoting Japanese scholarship and culture globally.

== Early life and education ==
Shigeo Minowa was born in Tokyo in 1926. He attended the University of Tokyo, where he graduated in 1950 from the Faculty of Economics.

== Career ==
=== University of Tokyo Press ===
In 1951, shortly after his graduation, Minowa co-founded the University of Tokyo Press with two former classmates. Under his leadership as managing director, the press became the largest university press in Japan and gained international recognition. Minowa led the press to become one of the first non-US-based members of the Association of American University Presses.

=== Internationalization efforts ===
In 1969 Minowa established the International Publications Division at the University of Tokyo Press and played a pivotal role in making Japanese scholarship known abroad. His contributions were recognized in 1990 when the Japan Foundation awarded the press a Special Prize.

=== United Nations and later career ===
Minowa joined the United Nations in 1975 to help create the United Nations University Press in Tokyo. United Nations System of Organizations lists his role as Chief of Academic Services and Director of UNU Press. After retiring at the age of sixty, Minowa continued his academic and international work as a professor at Kanagawa University, where he established the Institute of International Business and Management.

== Academic contributions ==
Minowa completed his PhD at Sophia University in Tokyo in 2002, at the age of 76. He was a prolific writer, authoring twelve books in both Japanese and English on various aspects of publishing and international communication. He was also a founding member and the first president of the International Association of Scholarly Publishers (IASP).

=== Major works ===
- Publishing in Japan : its past present and future (1986) Minowa S. (1986). Publishing in Japan : its past present and future. IFLA.
- Minowa, Shigeo. Book Publishing in a Societal Context; Japan and the West. Japan Scientific Societies Press, 1990.
- Minowa, Shigeo (1991). The takeoff phenomenon: Is there a theory of book development? Logos. Anales Del Seminario de Metafísica [Universidad Complutense de Madrid, España] 2 (3):140-144.
- Minowa S. (2000). Introduction to publishing studies. Japan Scientific Society Press.

== Legacy and death ==
Shigeo Minowa died on 30 August 2013, at the age of 87. His legacy continues through his contributions to the field of publishing and his efforts to bridge the gap between Japanese scholarship and the rest of the world.
