= Heinrich von Ahaus =

Heinrich von Ahaus (in Dutch Hendrik van Ahuis) (1371–1439) was the founder of the Brethren of the Common Life in Germany.

== Biography ==
He was born in 1371, the natural son of Ludolf, Lord of the principality of Ahaus, and Hadwigis of Schöppingen. About 1396 he joined the Brethren of the Common Life at Deventer, where personal intercourse with the companions of the founder, especially Florentius Radewyns, thoroughly acquainted him with the spirit and methods of the congregation, then in its first fervour. It is probable that during the plague of 1398 he left Deventer for Amersfort (another Dutch city) with Florentius, on whose death he returned to his native Münster to establish a community there.

In any case the records at Münster point to 1400 as the date of foundation. The benefactions of his family enabled Heinrich to provide generously for the new community, and in 1429 to establish it on his family estate of Springbrunnen (Ad fontem salientem), where he and his companions, besides continuing their missionary work in the diocese, applied themselves to the copying of manuscripts. The Catholic Encyclopedia credits them with great influence on the spread of Catholic literature in Germany, as well as on education and on the training of the clergy.

The Brethren faced opposition from both priests and laymen. Heinrich accompanied Johann Vos van Heusden, Rector of Windesheim, to the Council of Constance (1414–18), where they succeeded in refuting the charges lodged against the Brethren by the Dominican Mathüus Grabow.

Heinrich also founded houses of the congregation at Cologne (1416), Wesel (1435) and Osnabrück, and the communities of sisters at Borken, Coesfeld, Lippstadt, Wesel and Bodeken. In 1428 he inaugurated the union of the Münster and Cologne houses, which was sanctioned by papal decree, a few months after his death, and joined in 1441 by the house at Wesel. He died at Münster in 1439.
