= Heitor Gurgulino de Souza =

Brazilian physicist

Former Rector of United Nations University (UNU)
- Secretary-General: Javier Pérez de Cuéllar; Boutros Boutros-Ghali; Kofi Annan

Personal details
- Born: August 1, 1928 Brazil
- Died: November 18, 2023 (aged 95) Brazil

Gurgulino de Souza (August 1, 1928 – November 18, 2023) was a Brazilian physicist.

== Early life and education ==
He was born and raised in Brazil, earned a bachelor's degree in physics from Mackenzie Presbyterian University in São Paulo and did graduate work at the Instituto Tecnológico de Aeronáutica in Brazil and the University of Kansas in the United States. In 1959, he launched his career as a professor at the "Julio de Mesquita Filbo" São Paulo State University.

== Career in USA ==
In 1962, Gurgulino de Souza joined the Pan American Union's scientific department at its headquarters in Washington, D.C., where he spent the next seven years organizing a regional program for scientific and technological development and promoting research, training, and curricular programs throughout Latin America. During this time, he oversaw the Unit of Education and Research within the Department of Scientific Affairs of the Organization of American States (OAS).

== Career in Brazil ==
Returning to Brazil in 1970, Gurgulino de Souza assisted in establishing the Federal University of São Carlos in Sao Paulo and was subsequently named the institution's first Rector. During the 1970s and early 1980s, he held numerous positions within the Brazilian Ministry of Education and Culture and the National Council for Scientific and Technological Development of Brazil.

== International career ==
From 1974 to 1977, Gurgulino de Souza presided over the Inter-American Committee on Science and Technology of the OAS Council on Education, Science, and Culture. Additionally, he was involved with the International Association of University Presidents, the International Council for Educational Development, and the Institute Ajijic Sobre Educación Internacional de México.

Gurgulino de Souza served as Special Advisor to the Director-General of UNESCO from 1997 to 1999 before being elected vice-president of the International Association of University Presidents (IAUP) for the period 1999–2002. He was President of the Latin American University Group, and director of the Planning Commission of the Federal Council of Education in the Brazilian Ministry of Education. Gurgulino de Souza was appointed the third Rector of the UNU on 30 March 1987, succeeding Soedjatmoko. He became president in September 1987. He was a United Nations University Council member at the time of his appointment.
