= Empel-Rees station =

Railway station in Germany

Empel-Rees
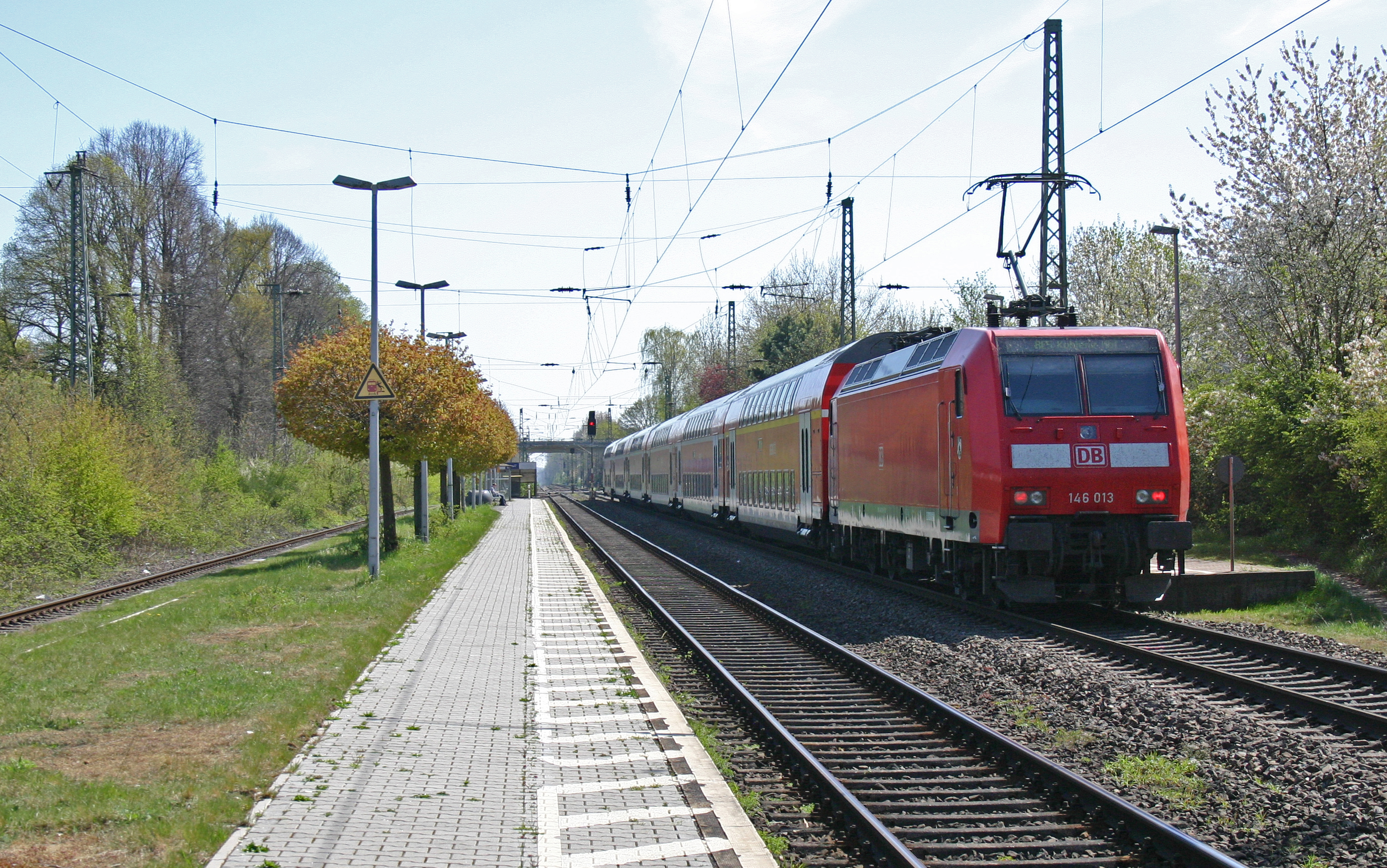

General information
- Location: Empel, Rees, NRW; Germany
- Coordinates: 51°47′54″N 6°25′01″E
- Line: Arnhem-Oberhausen railway
- Platforms: 2
- Tracks: 3

Construction
- Accessible: Platform 1 only

Other information
- Fare zone: VRR: 793
- Website: www.bahnhof.de

Services
Preceding station	VIAS	Following station
Millingen (bei Rees) towards Arnhem Centraal	RE 19	Haldern (Rheinland) towards Düsseldorf Hbf
Location
- Location within North Rhine-Westphalia

Empel-Rees is a railway station in Empel near Rees, North Rhine-Westphalia, Germany. The station is located on the Arnhem-Oberhausen railway and is served by RE services operated by VIAS.

== Train services ==
The station is served by the following services:

- Regional services RE 19 Arnhem - Emmerich - Wesel - Oberhausen - Duisburg - Düsseldorf

== Bus services ==
- 61 (Rees - Empel-Rees - Millingen - Bocholt)
- 63 (Millingen - Empel-Rees - Haldern - Wesel)
- 87 (Rees - Empel-Rees - Millingen)
