= Mehrhoog station =

Railway station in Germany

Mehrhoog
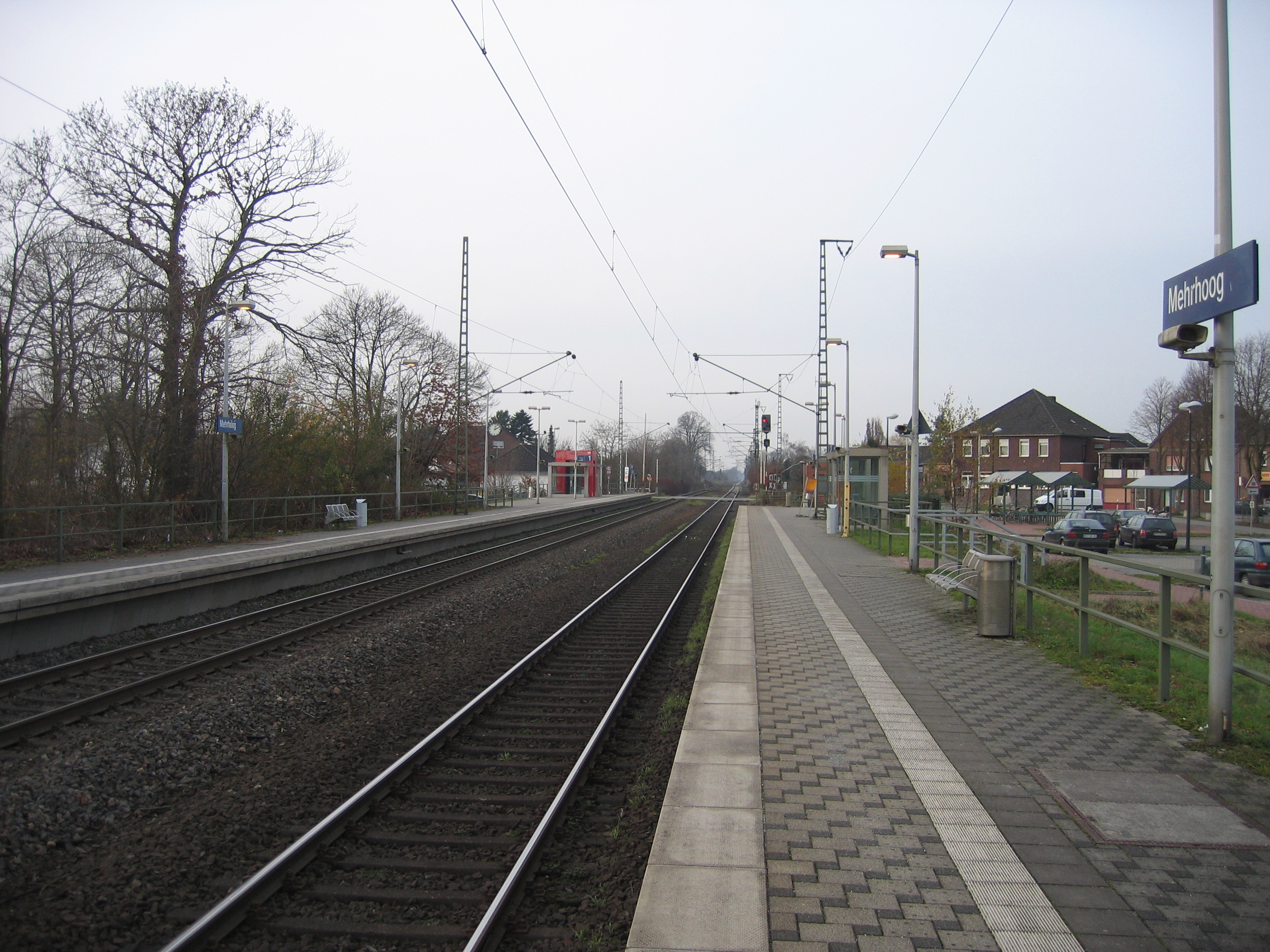

General information
- Location: Mehrhoog, Hamminkeln, NRW; Germany
- Coordinates: 51°44′19″N 6°31′06″E
- Line: Arnhem-Oberhausen railway
- Platforms: 2
- Tracks: 2

Construction
- Accessible: Yes

Other information
- Fare zone: VRR: 884
- Website: www.bahnhof.de

Services
| Preceding station | VIAS | Following station |
|---|---|---|
| Haldern (Rheinland) towards Arnhem Centraal | RE 19 | Wesel-Feldmark towards Düsseldorf Hbf |
Location
- Location within North Rhine-Westphalia

Mehrhoog is a railway station in Mehrhoog, part of Hamminkeln, North Rhine-Westphalia, Germany. The station is located on the Arnhem-Oberhausen railway. The train services are operated by VIAS.

== Train services ==
The station is served by the following services:

- Regional services RE 19 Arnhem - Emmerich - Wesel - Oberhausen - Duisburg - Düsseldorf

== Bus services ==
- 86 (Rees - Mehr - Mehrhoog - Bislich - Flüren - Wesel - Lauerhaus - Wittenberg)
