= United Nations University Institute for Sustainability and Peace =

- 国連大学サステイナビリティと平和研究所

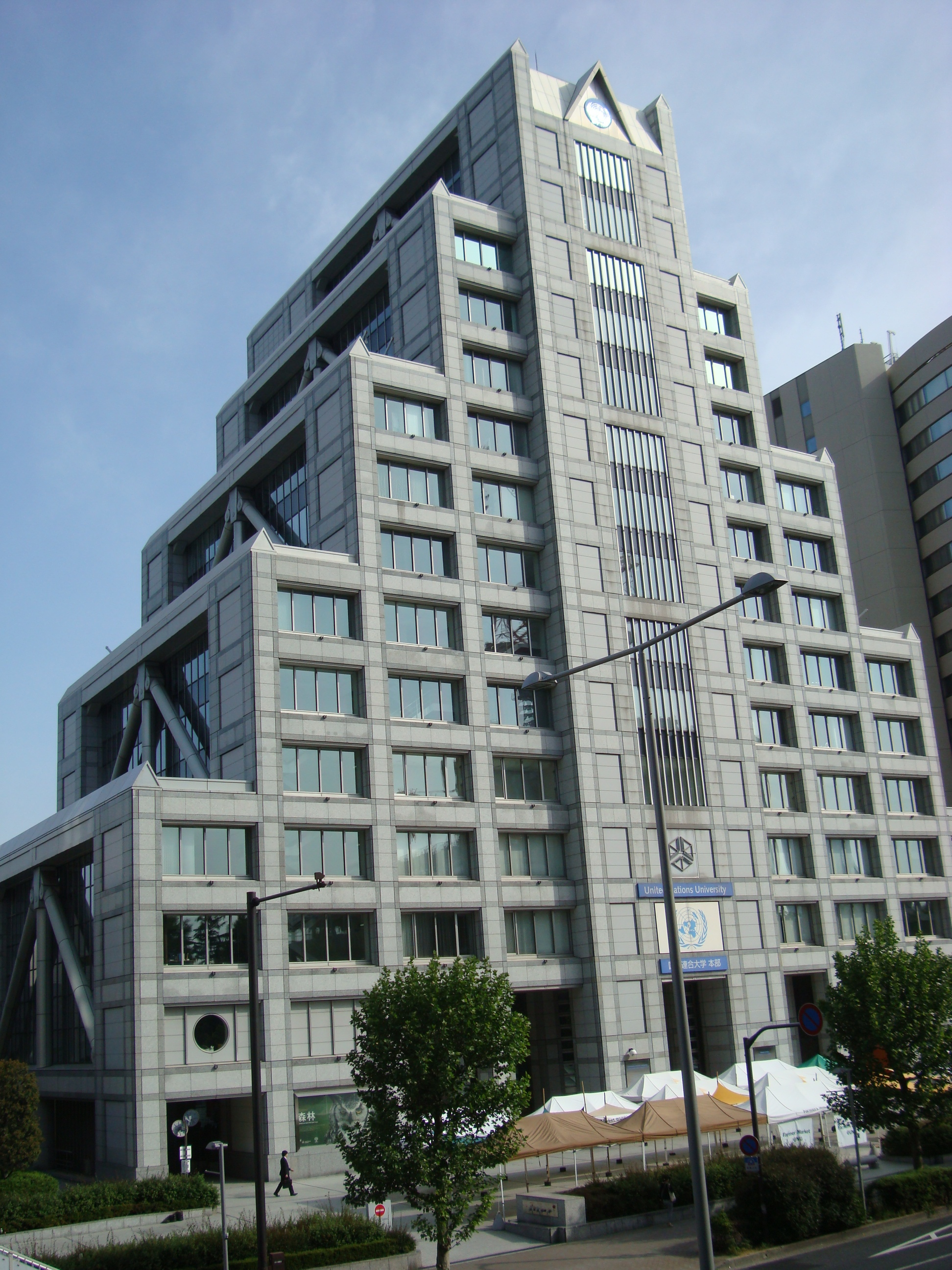
- United Nations University headquarters
- Abbreviation: UNU-ISP
- Formation: 2009-2013
- Type: University, NGO
- Legal status: Inactive
- Headquarters: Japan Tokyo Shibuya
- Website: United Nations University Institute for Sustainability and Peace

The United Nations University Institute for Sustainability and Peace (UNU-ISP) was an institute of the United Nations University (UNU), which provides a bridge between the UN and the international academic and policy-making communities. UNU-ISP was based at UNU headquarters in Tokyo, Japan, with an Operating Unit located in Germany (UNU-ISP SCYCLE).

In 2013, the UNU-ISP merged with the United Nations University Institute for Advanced Study, forming the United Nations Institute for the Advanced Study of Sustainability (UNU-IAS). As of 2023, the still Tokyo-based UNU-IAS focuses on research concerning sustainable development, biodiversity and society, water and resource management, and education. UNU-IAS produces academic studies, annual reports, and public policy papers. It also offers advanced degrees at the MA and PhD levels, as well as postdoctoral fellowships and courses aimed at connecting current research in these areas with the UN's Sustainable Development Goals (SDGs).

== Overview ==
As an institute of the United Nations University, UNU-ISP was bound by the UNU Charter, and the guidelines set out by the UNU Council.

UNU-ISP worked in collaboration with other UNU institutes and programs, as well as through collaborative relationships with the global academic and policy-making communities. Within the context of sustainability and peace, UNU-ISP:

- Conducts research; undertakes education, training and capacity development; and facilitates the dissemination of scientific knowledge and information to the United Nations and its agencies, to scholars and to the public.
- Provides opportunities for postgraduate students and professionals to obtain a wider understanding of relevant issues.
- Integrates the natural sciences, social sciences and humanities into a transdisciplinary approach that contributes to the development and strengthening of policy frameworks and management actions at all levels.

UNU-ISP offered a postgraduate program, the Master of Science in Sustainability, Development, and Peace. This two-year program addresses pressing global issues through an innovative interdisciplinary approach that integrates the natural sciences, social sciences, and humanities. Today that work is carried on with greater focus on sustainability as part of the UNU-IAS.

== History ==
UNU-ISP became operational on 1 January 2009 to give an institutional identity and profile to the integrated academic activities of two former UNU programs: the Environment and Sustainable Development program, and the Peace and Governance program. The institute combines the strengths in natural sciences, social sciences and the humanities of these two former programs, and creates transdisciplinary synergies that can more effectively address pressing global problems of human survival, development and welfare. As of 2013, UNU-ISP became part of the larger UNU-IAS.

== Research ==
In line with the UNU Charter, the research of UNU-ISP focused on "global problems of human survival, development and welfare that are the concern of the United Nations and its agencies". Today, UNU-IAS supports and produces "evidence-based knowledge and solutions to inform policymaking and address priority issues for the UN system." It emphasizes novel methodologies which "challenge conventional thinking and develop creative solutions to emerging issues of global concern." The key areas of focus are sustainable development, biodiversity and society, water and resource management, and education.
