= Wesel-Feldmark station =

Railway station in Wesel, Germany

Wesel Feldmark
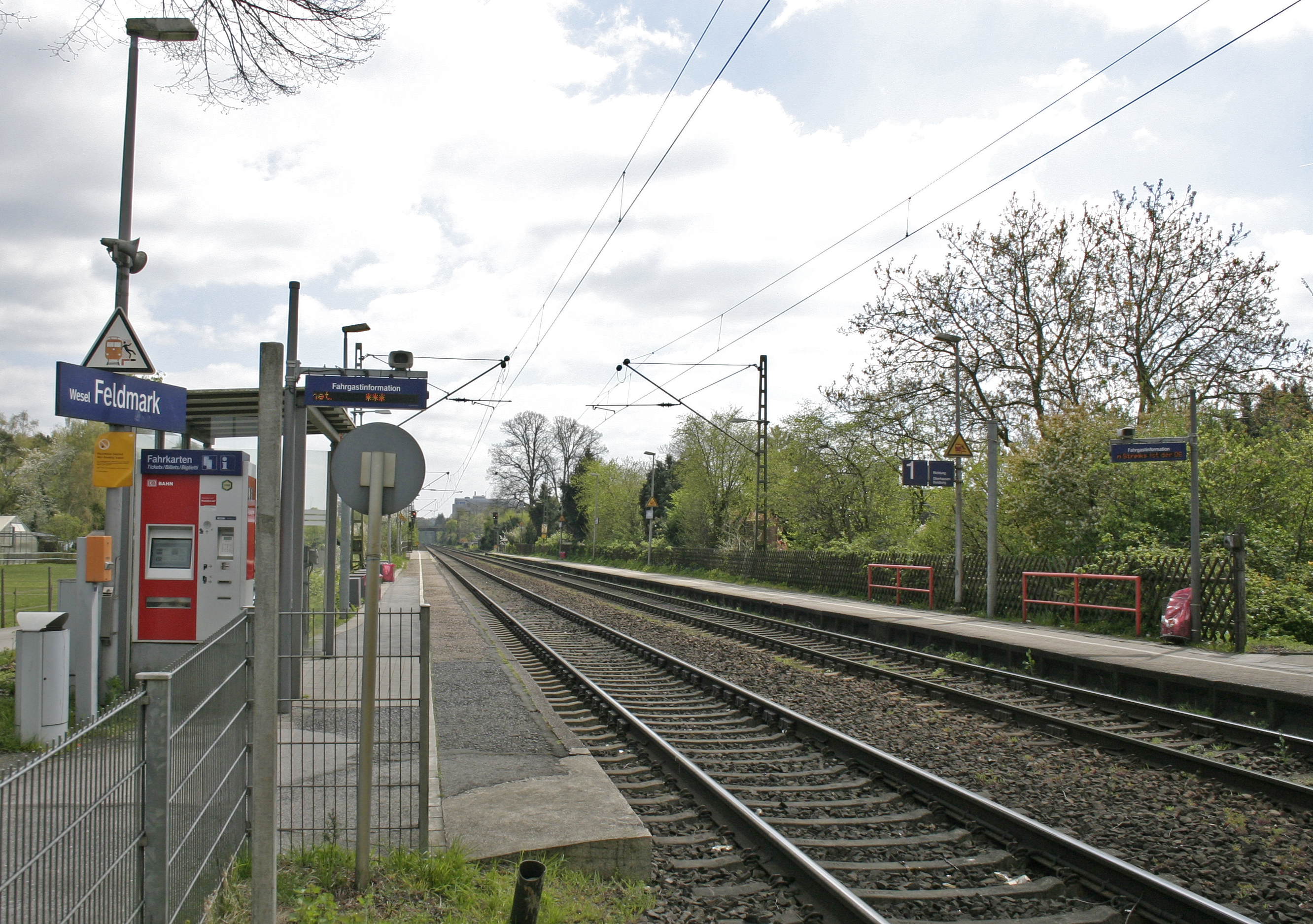

General information
- Location: Wesel, NRW; Germany
- Coordinates: 51°40′34″N 6°37′01″E
- Owner: Deutsche Bahn
- Operator: DB Netz; DB Station&Service
- Line: Arnhem-Oberhausen railway
- Platforms: 2
- Tracks: 2

Construction
- Accessible: Yes

Other information
- Fare zone: VRR: 031
- Website: www.bahnhof.de

Services
| Preceding station | VIAS | Following station |
|---|---|---|
| Mehrhoog towards Arnhem Centraal | RE 19 | Wesel towards Düsseldorf Hbf |
Location

Wesel-Feldmark is a railway station in Wesel, North Rhine-Westphalia, Germany. The station is located on the Arnhem-Oberhausen railway. The train services are operated by VIAS.

== Train services ==
The station is served by the following services:

- Regional services RE 19 Arnhem - Emmerich - Wesel - Oberhausen - Duisburg - Düsseldorf
