= Schöppingen =

- Municipality
- Flag Coat of arms

- Location of Schöppingen within Borken district
- Interactive map of Schöppingen
- Location within Germany Location within North Rhine-Westphalia
- Coordinates: 52°06′00″N 07°13′59″E
- Country: Germany
- State: North Rhine-Westphalia
- Admin. region: Münster
- District: Borken
- Subdivisions: 2

Government
  - Mayor (2020–25): Franz-Josef Franzbach (Ind.)

Area
  - Total: 68.81 km^{2} (26.57 sq mi)
- Elevation: 90 m (300 ft)

Population (2025-12-31)
  - Total: 6,746
  - Density: 98.04/km^{2} (253.9/sq mi)
- Time zone: UTC+01:00 (CET)
  - Summer (DST): UTC+02:00 (CEST)
- Postal codes: 48624
- Dialling codes: 02555, 02545 (Eggerode)
- Vehicle registration: BOR
- Website: www.schoeppingen.de

Schöppingen (German pronunciation: [ˈʃœpɪŋən]; Low German: Schüöping) is a municipality in the district of Borken in the state of North Rhine-Westphalia, Germany. It is located approximately 10 km (6.2 mi) south-west of Steinfurt.

The Master of the Schöppingen Altarpiece derives his name from an altarpiece that hangs in the town parish church.

== Population ==
Historical population

Year	Pop.	±% p.a.
1965	4,393	—
1970	4,561	+0.75%
1975	4,716	+0.67%
1980	4,823	+0.45%
1985	5,195	+1.50%
1990	5,732	+1.99%
1995	6,379	+2.16%

Year	Pop.	±% p.a.
2000	7,846	+4.23%
2005	7,814	−0.08%
2010	8,398	+1.45%
2015	7,280	−2.82%
2020	6,759	−1.47%
2025	6,746	−0.04%

Source: Landesdatabank Nordrhein-Westfalen

== Gallery ==
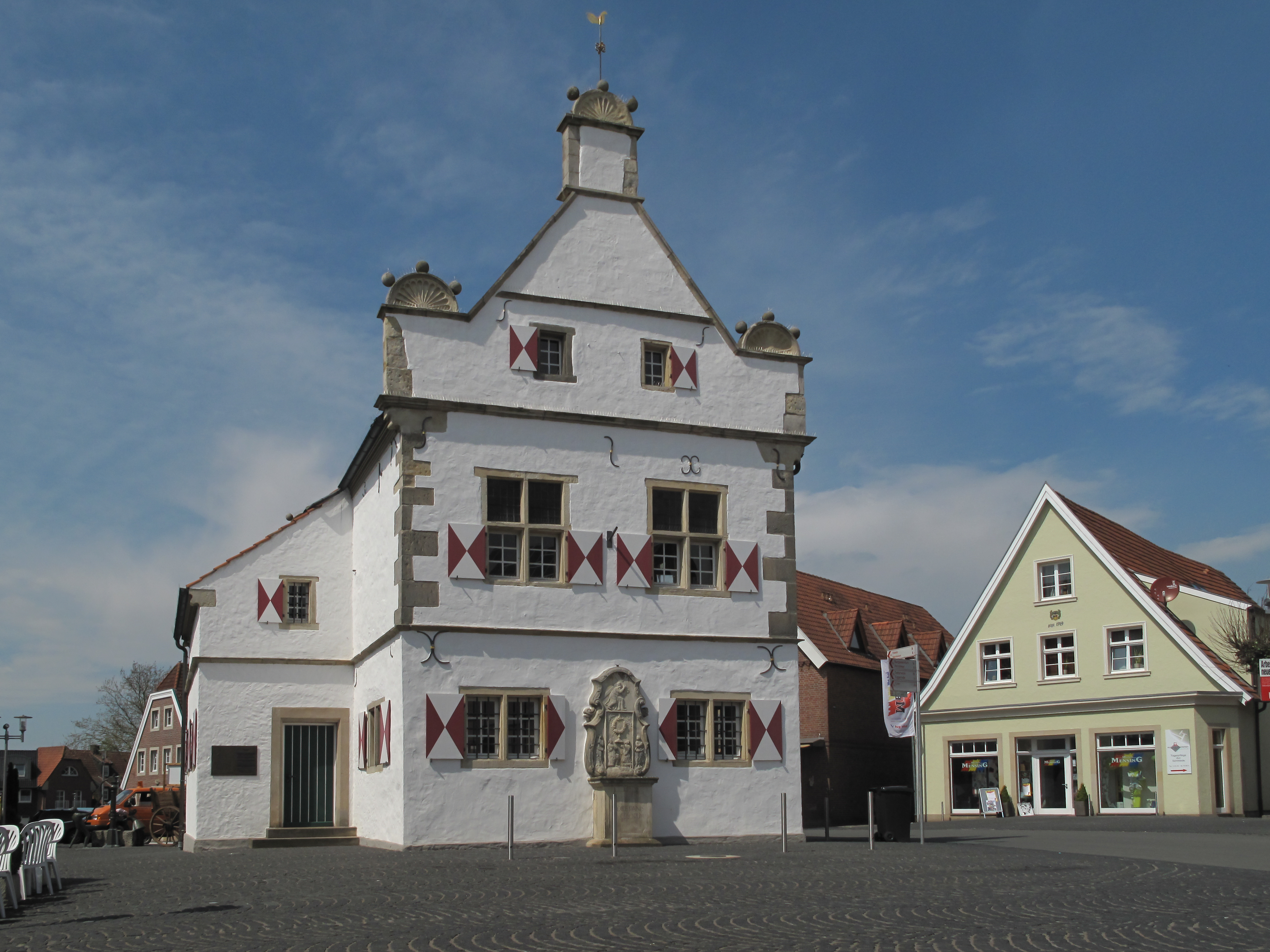
Das Alte Rathaus

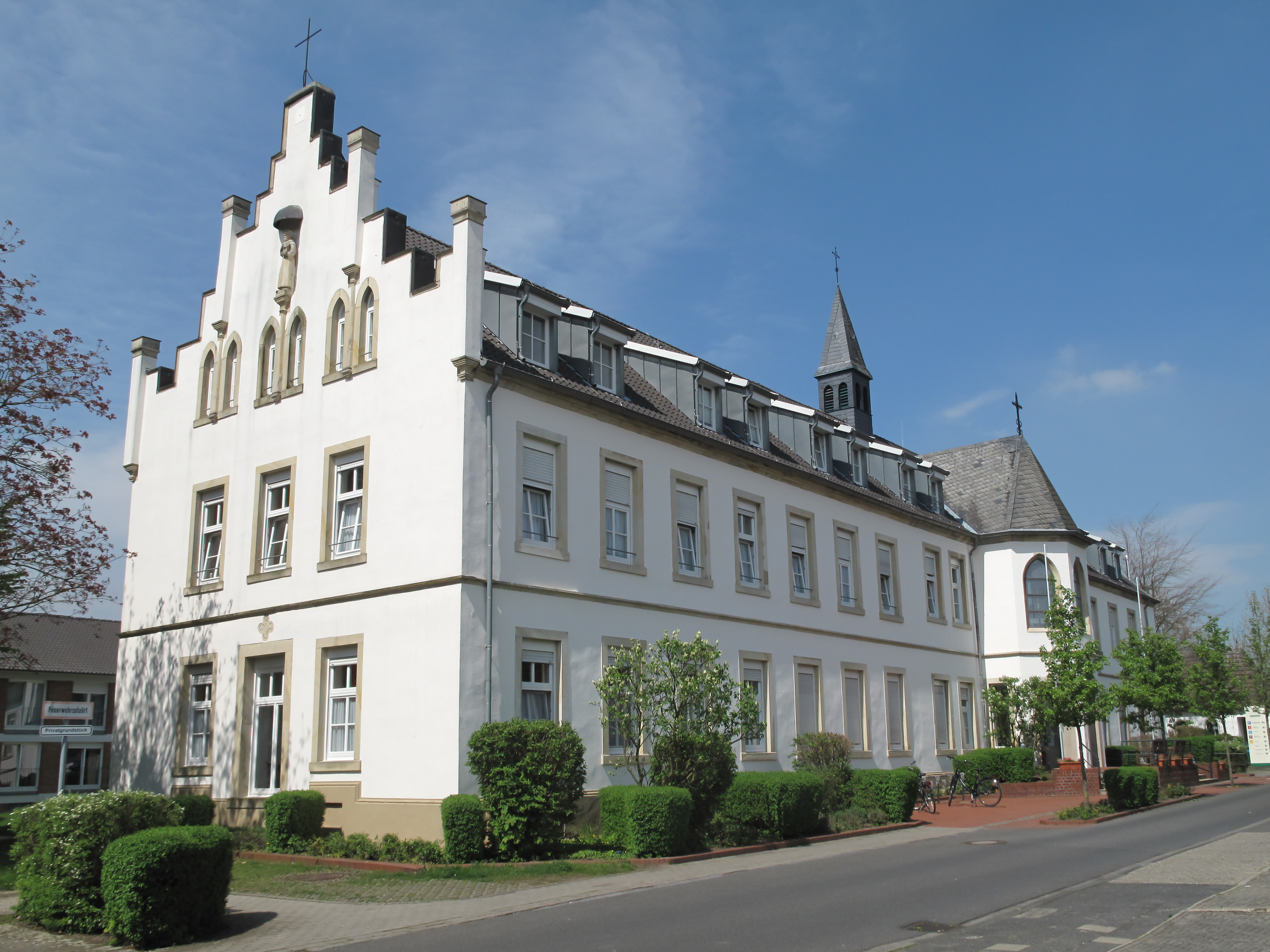
Das Sankt Antoniushaus

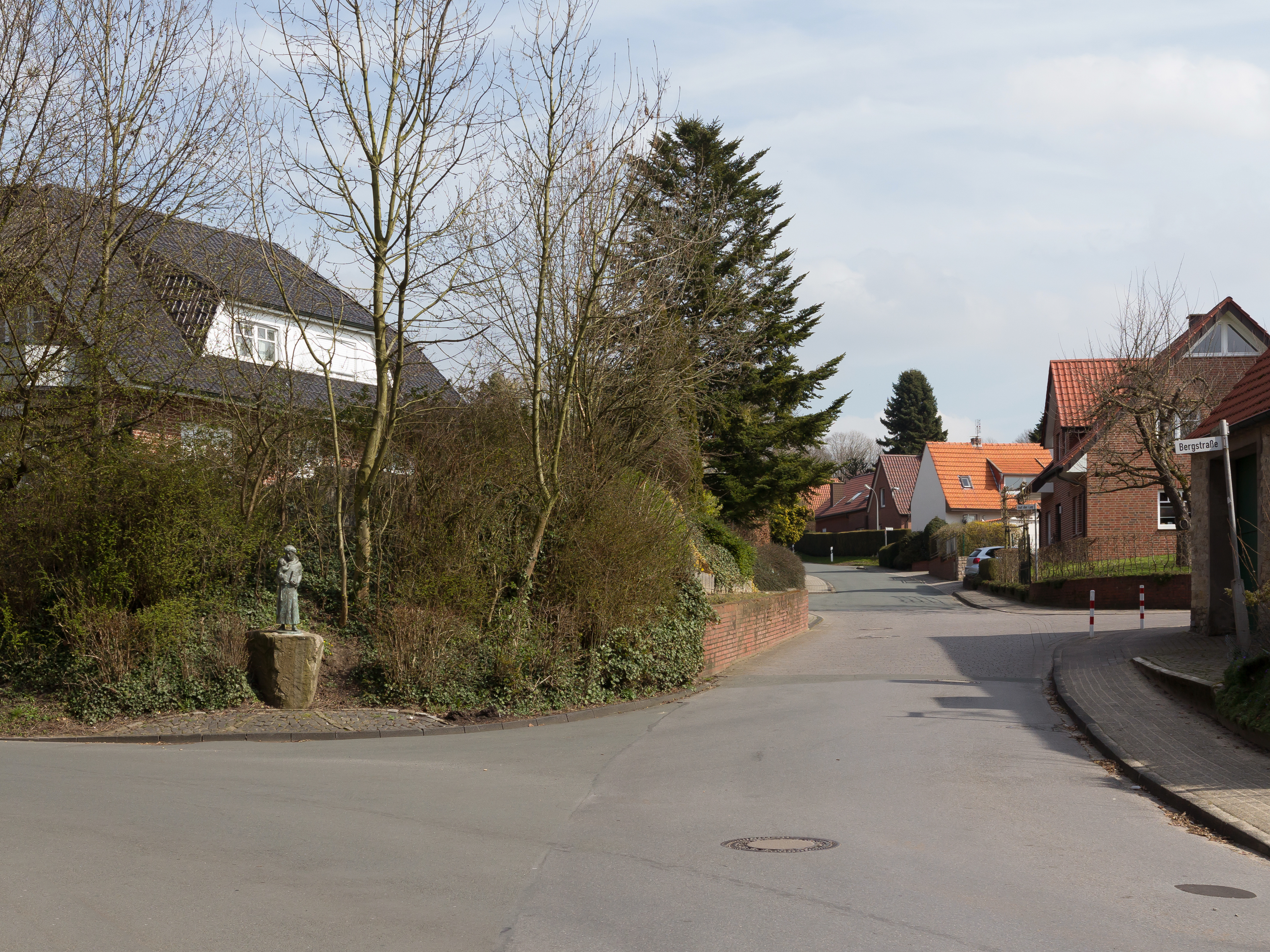
Bergstrasse with sculpture

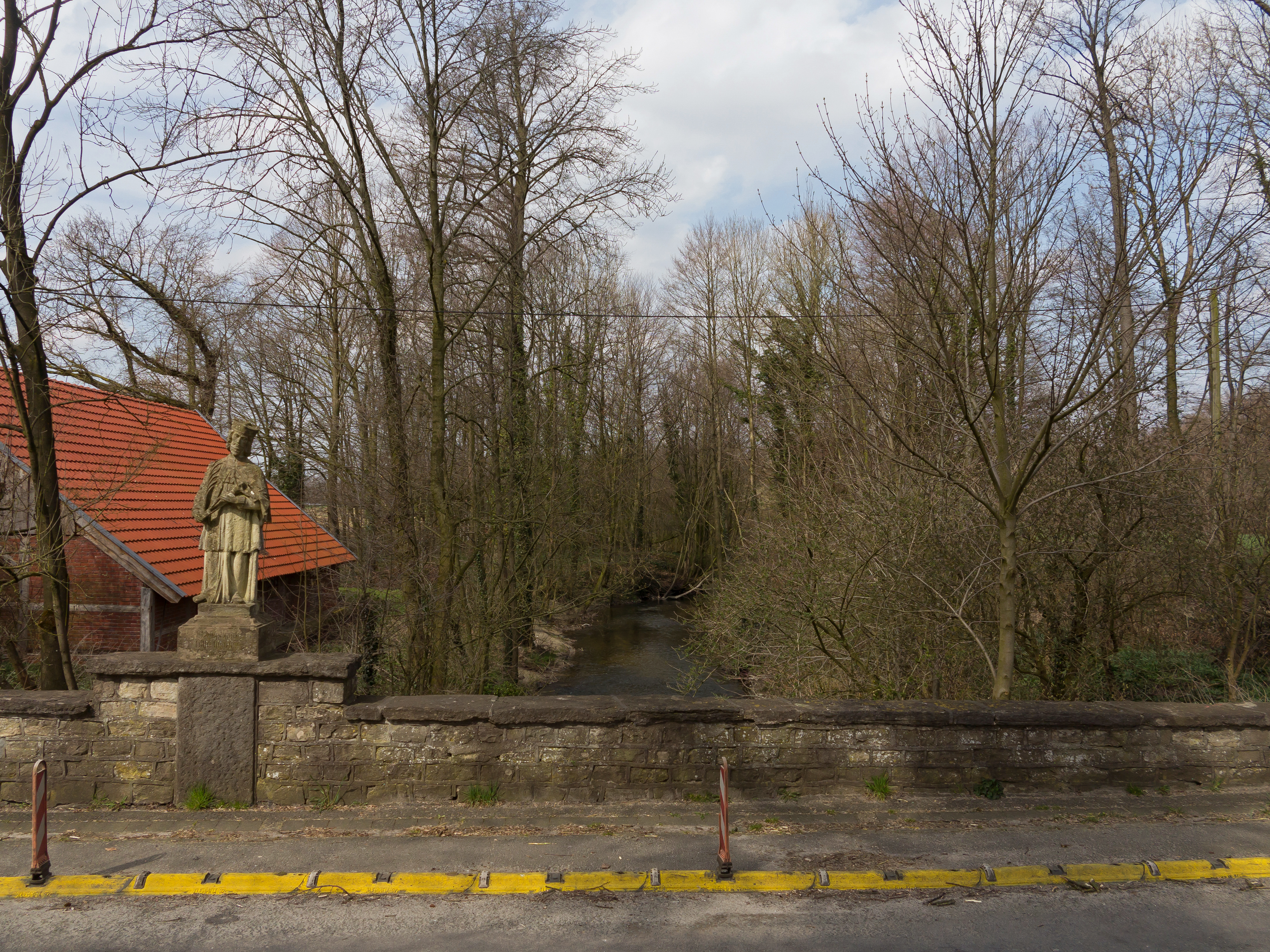
Statue of Saint Johannes Nepomuk

== Personalities ==
- Heinrich von Ahaus (c. 1371–1439), promoter of the movement of the brothers and sisters of common life
- Heinrich Krechting (1501–1580), radical leader of the Baptist movement
