= Master of the Schöppingen Altarpiece =

German painter

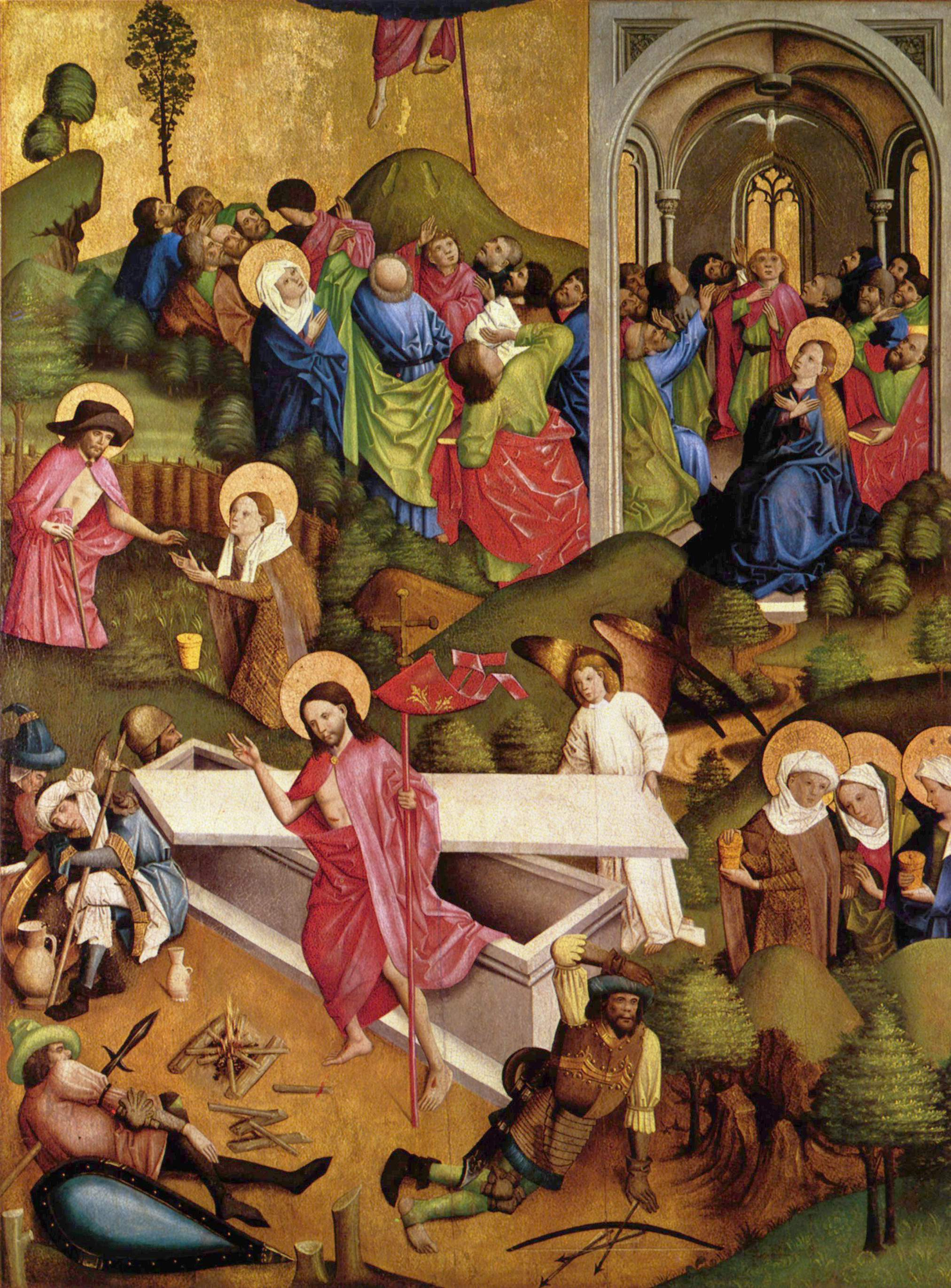
Altarpiece dated to about 1470, that hangs in the parish church of Schöppingen

The Master of the Schöppingen Altar (German: Meister des Schöppinger Altars), also referred to as the Master of Schöppingen, was a German artist active in the area around Münster between approximately 1450 and 1470. It appears likely that he studied in the Netherlands, and was influenced by the work of Robert Campin and Rogier van der Weyden. His name is derived from an altarpiece, dated to about 1470, that hangs in the parish church of Schöppingen. At the center of the painting is a depiction of the Crucifixion, along with four scenes from the Passion, which have been integrated into the background landscape. On the interior of the wings are eight more Passion scenes, while on their exterior are representations of the Annunciation and the Nativity. Of these, the former appears to have been derived from the Altarpiece of Saint Barbara painted by Campin, while the latter is an original composition.

Other works ascribed to the Master's hand include an altarpiece at Haldern, today held in the Westphalian State Museum of Art and Cultural History, as is a panel from a now-disbanded altarpiece depicting Saint Nicholas and the Fathers of the Church. Also believed to be by him are a mural fragment in the Münster Cathedral and an altarpiece, dated to before 1470, that stood in the Wiesenkirche of Soest before its destruction in 1945.
