= UNU-FLORES =

German research institute

The United Nations University Institute for Integrated Management of Material Fluxes and of Resources, known since 2026 as UNU Resource Nexus (formerly UNU-FLORES), was established in 2012 with the support of the Federal Ministry of Education and Research (BMBF) and the Ministry for Science, Culture and Tourism (SMWK) of the Free State of Saxony, Germany. It is one of the 13 institutes that make up the United Nations University (UNU) — a global think tank and postgraduate teaching organization headquartered in Tokyo, Japan.

With its office situated in the World Trade Center Dresden, the Institute works closely with the Technische Universität Dresden (TU Dresden), among other research institutes and universities. In 2021, UNU Resource Nexus established a branch office in Weisswasser to strengthen outreach efforts in Lusatia. UNU Resource Nexus also collaborates through hubs, which are partnerships with other institutes, to promote research, capacity development, and outreach tackling global challenges and supporting UN priorities.

As part of UNU, the mandate of UNU Resource Nexus is to support the United Nations and its member states through research, postgraduate education, and capacity building.

== Organization and institutional structure ==
=== Advisory committee ===
The International Advisory Committee of UNU Resource Nexus, comprising eminent scientists from different fields and regions of the world, is entrusted by the Council and Rector of UNU to advise on the research and other activities of UNU Resource Nexus. The committee officially convenes on an annual basis. The current chair is Prof. Ester van der Voet.

Current Advisory Committee Members
Name	Role	Country
Ester van der Voet	Advisory Committee Chair	The Netherlands
Hasmik Barseghyan	Advisory Committee Member	Armenia
Roswitha Böhm	Advisory Committee Member	Germany

The Director of UNU Resource Nexus has overall responsibility for the research and management of the Institute and implements the research programmes within the policies and guidelines set out by the International Advisory Committee and the Council.

=== Foundation and leadership ===
While UNU was formally inaugurated in 1975, UNU Resource Nexus was founded on 20 December 2012 as UNU-FLORES. The founding director of UNU Resource Nexus was Prof. Reza Ardakanian of Iran. Prior to his directorship, Ardakanian was the Director of the UN-Water Decade Programme on Capacity Development since 2007, and was Vice-Rector of UNU in Europe, ad interim (2009–2011). He holds a PhD in Water Resources Management from McMaster University and is a faculty member of Sharif University of Technology in Tehran, Iran. In October 2017, Ardakanian was appointed as the Minister of Energy of the Islamic Republic of Iran by President Hassan Rouhani.

List of Directors at UNU Resource Nexus
#	Director	Took office	Left office
1	Reza Ardakanian	10 December 2012	27 October 2017
2	Kai Schwärzel (interim Officer-in-Charge)	30 October 2017	31 August 2018
3	Edeltraud Günther	3 September 2018	31 August 2026
4	Daniel Karthe	1 September 2026	Incumbent

On 3 September 2018, Prof. Edeltraud Günther assumed the position of Director at UNU-FLORES. Günther received her doctorate in Environmental Accounting from the University of Augsburg and had been the Chair of Environmental Management and Accounting at TU Dresden since 1996. She initiated the Centre for Performance and Policy Research in Sustainability Measurement and Assessment (PRISMA) in 2016.

On 1 September 2026, Prof. Daniel Karthe assumed the position of Director of UNU Resource Nexus.

=== Renaming to UNU Resource Nexus (2026) ===
The institute was renamed UNU Resource Nexus on 1 July 2026, with an aim of better reflecting its scientific identity and strategic focus. The change was announced by UNU Rector Tshilidzi Marwala at a ceremony in Dresden marking the departure of outgoing Director Edeltraud Guenther and the appointment of Daniel Karthe as her successor.

== Key research areas ==
UNU-FLORES aims to advance the "Resource Nexus" for all environmental resources: water, soil, waste, energy, and other geo-resources that are of concern to the United Nations and its member states – particularly in developing and emerging economies.

UNU-FLORES research covers topics related to the nexus of the following environmental resources, complemented by data analysis and integrative modelling tools:

- water (e.g., water scarcity, integrated watershed management)
- soil (e.g., counteracting soil degradation, securing soil functions, fostering sustainable land-use management)
- waste (e.g., preventing losses and closing cycles of resources; avoiding contamination of water and soil)
- energy (in relation to water, soil, and waste; non-renewables and renewables)
- geo-resources (e.g., groundwater, rehabilitating sites)

All key research areas are closely connected to the overarching priorities of the UN and UNU.

== Programmes, projects, and activities ==
=== Joint PhD Programme in Integrated Management of Water, Soil, and Waste ===
Launched in 2015, UNU-FLORES offers a joint PhD programme in collaboration with the Faculty of Environmental Sciences at TU Dresden. The programme provides graduate students with a critical understanding and tools to take an interdisciplinary and integrated approach towards water, soil, and waste management. To date, eight doctoral candidates have graduated from the programme.

=== Nexus Seminars ===
One of the notable events arising from the collaboration between UNU-FLORES and PRISMA – Centre for Sustainability Assessment and Policy on behalf of TU Dresden, is the Nexus Seminar Series. The joint seminar series, which launched in 2015, features lectures by senior scholars that highlight all dimensions of research on the Nexus Approach, ranging from hands-on implementation strategies to theoretical debates. The Nexus Seminars serve not only as a platform for scientific exchange and cooperation between UNU-FLORES and TU Dresden but also a medium for the partner institutions to discuss their research with a broader audience.

=== Dresden Nexus Conference (DNC) ===
Jointly organised with TU Dresden and the Leibniz Institute of Ecological Urban and Regional Development (IOER), the first biennial conference was held from 25–27 March 2015. Each day was centred around the Nexus Approach vis-à-vis one aspect of global change: climate, urbanisation and population growth, to achieve the potential targets of the post-2015 Sustainable Development Goals. In 2017, the conference addressed the theme "SDGs and the Nexus Approach – Monitoring and Implementation". With a focus on resilient cities, the conference mainly targeted multifunctional land-use systems and resource management in resilient cities.

DNC2020, with the theme "Circular Economy in a Sustainable Society”, was held in a virtual format in response to the COVID-19 pandemic. This event received an impressive turnout, with 1216 registered participants from 101 countries, featuring 13 sessions, six expert statements, and five keynotes speeches.

== Partnerships ==
UNU-FLORES has an extensive network of partners across UN member states, universities and research institutions, the United Nations University (UNU) network, UN entities, international organizations and networks, and the private sector.

The cornerstone of UNU-FLORES's formalized agreements is the funding agreement with the Institute’s core donors: the Federal Ministry of Education and Research of the Federal Republic of Germany (BMBF) and the Saxon State Ministry for Higher Education, Research and the Arts (SMWK). TU Dresden is an important strategic partner.

UNU-FLORES was also integral in establishing the UNU Water Network, with Prof. Edeltraud Günther acting as founding Chair of the Network.
