= Dorit Petschel =

German woman historian

Dorit Petschel, married name Körner (born 1970), is a German historian and teacher.

== Life ==
After the Abitur in 1988, Petschel studied German culture and History at the Pädagogische Hochschule „Karl Friedrich Wilhelm Wander“ Dresden and at the Technische Universität Dresden respectively until 1993 and obtained the First Staatsexamen for the Higher Teaching Certificate for Grammar Schools with the dissertation Zwischen Rétablissement, Rheinbund und Restauration. Die sächsische Außenpolitik unter Kurfürst Friedrich August III. 1785 bis 1806. In 1997–1999, she held a traineeship at the Gymnasium Kreuzschule in Dresden, which was followed by the Second Staatsexamen in 1999. In 1999/2000 she taught at the Sauerbruch-Gymnasium Großröhrsdorf.

Petschel then headed the Geschichte der Technischen Universität Dresden office until 2003. In this capacity, together with Reiner Pommerin and Thomas Hänseroth, she compiled the publication 175 Years TU Dresden, which appeared in 2003, and independently as its volume 3, the standard work Die Professoren der Technischen Universität Dresden, 1828–2003, published on behalf of the Gesellschaft von Freunden und Förderern der Technischen Universität Dresden. In this catalogue of professors, all of the approximately 2,000 professors who have worked at today's Technical University or its predecessor institutions since its foundation in 1828 until the anniversary year 2003 are listed in alphabetical order. A position as a consultant for university development (2003–2005) was followed by work as a research assistant at the Institute for History at the Technical University of Dresden. She later worked at the Sächsische Landeszentrale für politische Bildung.

She now teaches German and history at the 36 Oberschule Dresden.

== Publications ==
- Christian Wilhelm Ludwig von Abeken (1826–1890). In Sächsische Justizminister 1831 bis 1850. Acht biographische Skizzen (Sächsische Justizgeschichte volume 4). Sächsisches Staatsministerium der Justiz – Referat Presse- und Öffentlichkeitsarbeit, Dresden 1994, pp. 41–65 (Numerized).
- Die Persönlichkeit Friedrich Augusts des Gerechten, Kurfürsten und Königs von Sachsen. In Uwe Schirmer (ed.): Sachsen 1763 bis 1832. Zwischen Rétablissement und bürgerlichen Reformen. Sax-Verlag, Beucha, 1996, ISBN 3-930076-23-3, pp. 77–100.
- Sächsische Außenpolitik unter Friedrich August I. Zwischen Rétablissement, Rheinbund und Restauration (Dresdner historische Studien Band 4). Böhlau, Cologne among others. 2000, ISBN 3-412-14299-9.
- 175 Jahre TU Dresden. Volume 3: Die Professoren der TU Dresden 1828–2003. Böhlau, Cologne among others 2003, ISBN 3-412-02503-8.
