= Reiner Pommerin =

German historian (1943–2024)

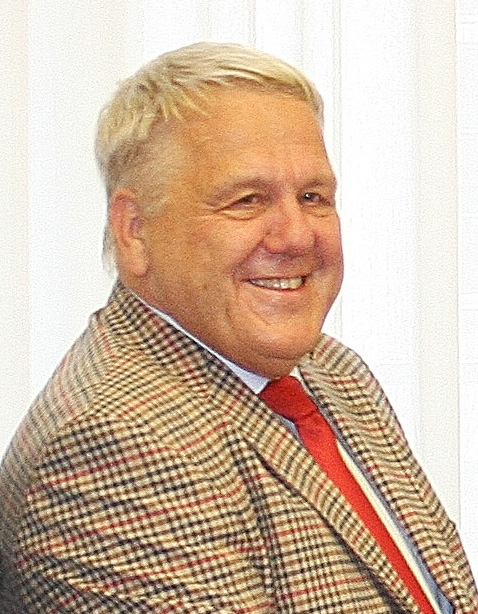
- Pommerin in 2011
- Born: 17 June 1943; Rees, Gau Essen, Germany
- Died: 4 July 2024 (aged 81); Dresden, Saxony, Germany
- Occupation: Historian

Reiner Pommerin (17 June 1943 – 4 July 2024) was a German historian specializing in the political and military history of the 18th to 21st centuries.

Pommerin was a visiting fellow at Harvard University's Center of European Studies in 1979–1980 and was a professor emeritus at the University of Dresden. He died on 4 July 2024, at the age of 81.

== Early life and military service ==
Reiner Pommerin was born on 17 June 1943 in Rees, Germany. He attended the Gymnasium Thomaeum in Kempen. Pommerin began military training with the 2nd Training Regiment of the German Air Force at Stade and initially received training as a flight operations specialist. He would eventually himself attending the Weapon School 50 at Fürstenfeldbruck, then attached to the officer candidate regiment at Uetersen for foreign language courses, and finally attending a non-commissioned officers' course at Husum. Pommerin left the Air Force in 1965. In 1969, he acquired his Mittlere Reife and Abitur from an evening school in Hamburg and entered Bundeswehr reserve as a reserve officer. He was made a colonel (Oberst der Reserve).

== Academic career ==
Pommerin studied history, psychology, pedagogy, and sociology at the Rhineland Teachers' School at Bonn and Cologne in 1969. He completed his studies in 1973 after passing his Staatsexamen and was awarded a pedagogical diploma.

Pommerin was awarded the Order of Merit of the Federal Republic of Germany, 1st Class by Franz Josef Jung on 4 June 2008.
