= United Nations University Press =

- Parent company: United Nations University
- Status: Defunct
- Publication types: Books
- Official website: unu.edu/publications/unu-press

The United Nations University Press was the publishing division of the United Nations University in Tokyo. It focused on academic research and scholarly publications revolving around the mission of the United Nations. It published mostly in English. It closed in January 2014, and its publishing activities then ended. The university has since made its publications freely available online at UNU Collections. It was voluntarily funded by governments, development assistance agencies, foundations and other public- and private-sector sources.

== See also ==
- List of English-language book publishing companies
- List of university presses
