= Johann von Soest (painter) =

German painter

Johann von Soest was a German painter active in Westphalia during the fifteenth century. He is sometimes associated with the Master of the Lippborg Passion.
