= United Nations University =

Think tank and academic arm of the UN

- Logo of the United Nations University
- Other name: UNU
- Type: Research university Think tank
- Established: December 1972; 53 years ago
- Founder: United Nations General Assembly
- Affiliations: United Nations
- Budget: US$118.3 million (2026–2027)
- Rector: Tshilidzi Marwala
- Students: 315 (2021)
- Postgraduates: 225 (2021)
- Doctoral students: 90 (2021)
- Location: Tokyo, Japan; 35.66237°N 139.70836°E
- Campus: Urban
- Website: www.unu.edu

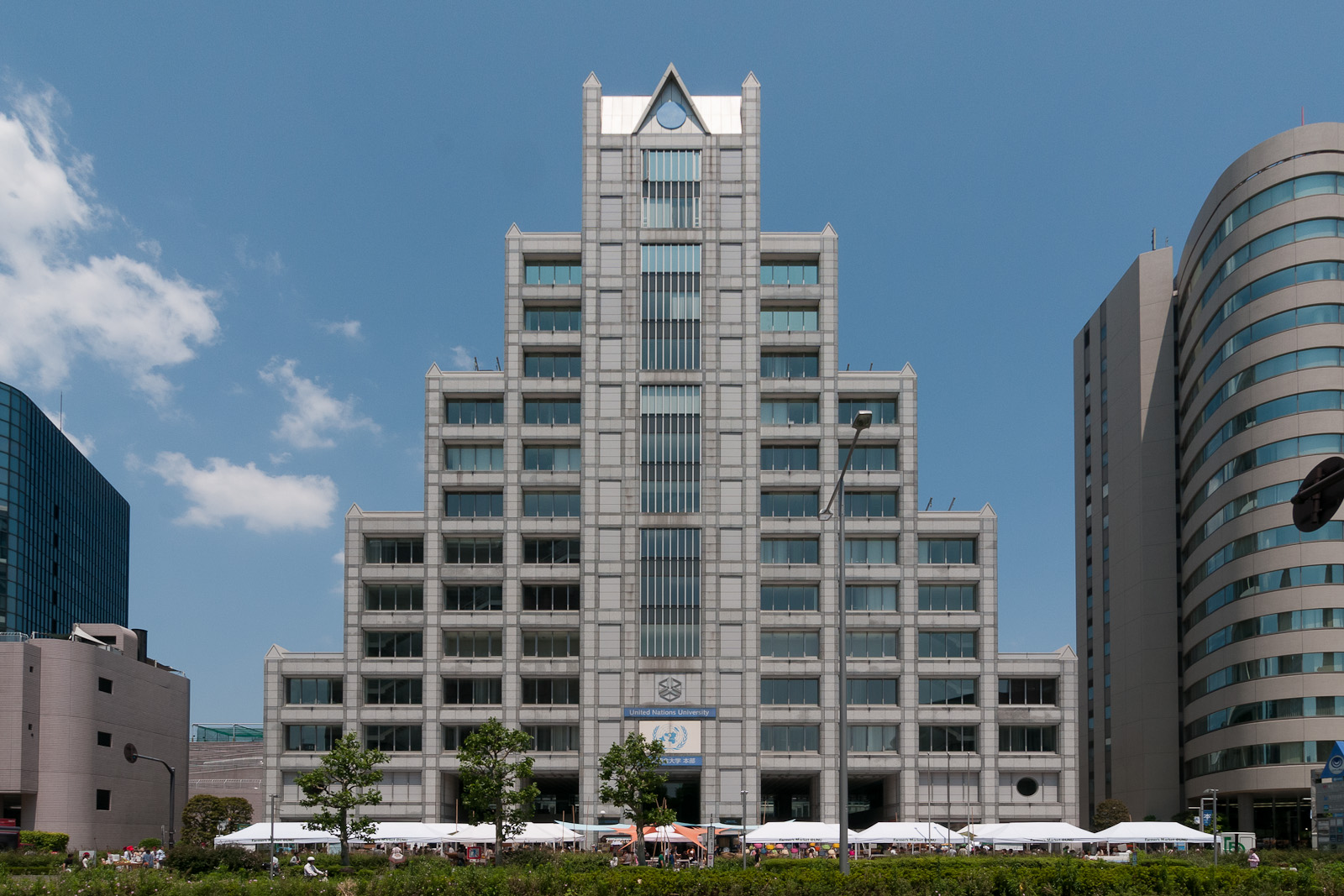
United Nations University in Tokyo

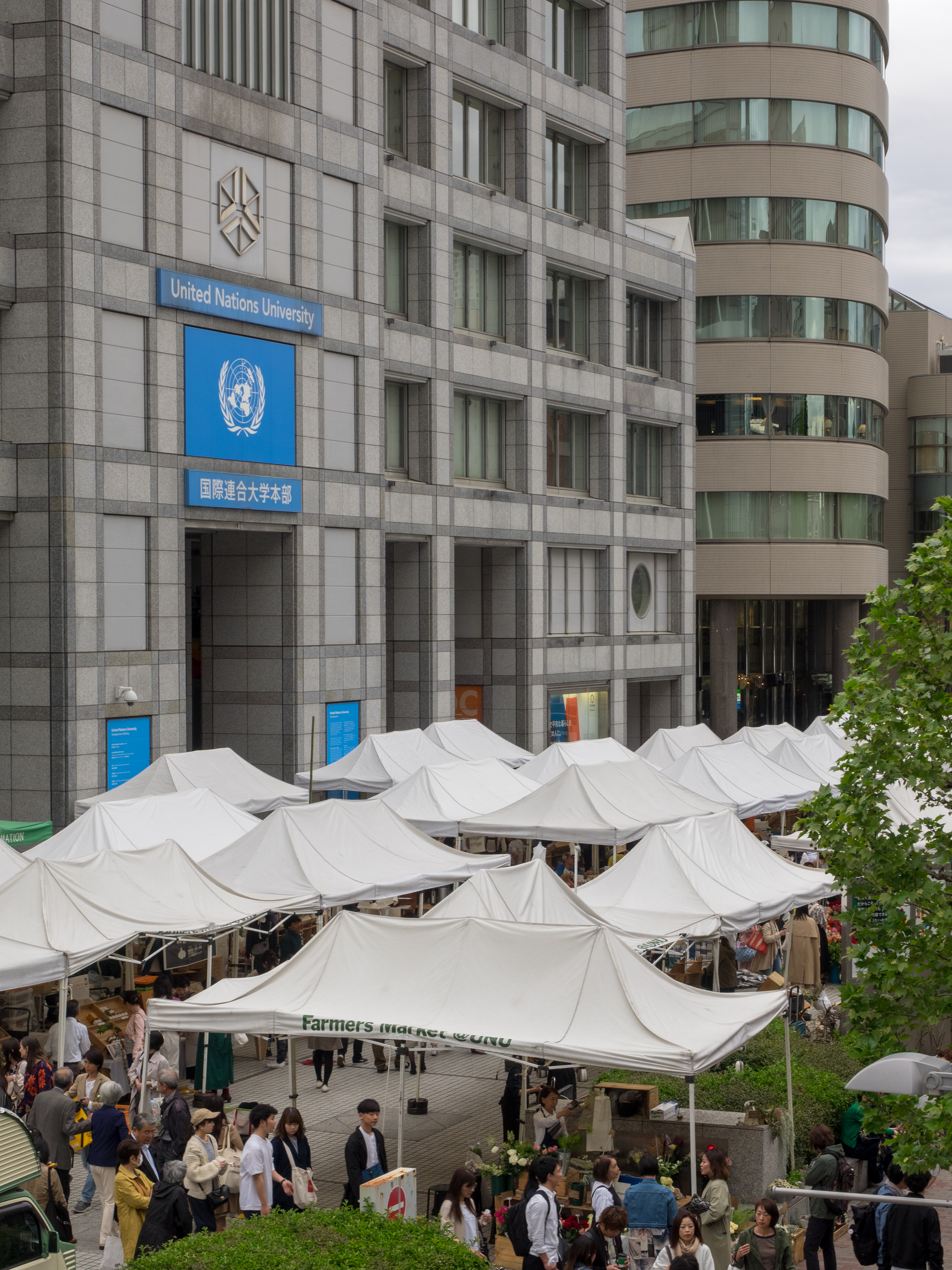
Entrance to the United Nations University, Tokyo building

The United Nations University (UNU) (国際連合大学, Kokusai Rengō Daigaku) is the think tank and academic arm of the United Nations. Headquartered in Shibuya, Tokyo, Japan, with diplomatic status as a UN institution, its mission is to help resolve global issues related to human development and welfare through collaborative research and education.

In 1969, UN Secretary-General U Thant proposed "the establishment of a United Nations university, truly international and devoted to the Charter objectives of peace and progress". Following three annual sessions discussing the matter, the United Nations General Assembly (UNGA) approved the founding of the United Nations University in December 1972. Tokyo was chosen as the main location due to the Japanese government's commitment to provide facilities and $100 million to the UNU endowment fund. The United Nations University was formally inaugurated in January 1975 as the world's first international university.

Since 2010, UNU has been authorized by the UNGA to grant postgraduate degrees, offering several master's and doctoral programs. The university's research officially prioritises three thematic areas: peace and governance; global development and inclusion; and environment, climate and energy. UNU also facilitates the UN's engagement with academic institutions and policymakers around the world, in part through campuses, programmes, and affiliated institutes spanning twelve countries.

== Organisation and leadership ==
The university is headed by a rector, who holds the rank of Under-Secretary-General of the United Nations.

To date, there have been seven Rectors at UNU. The current Rector is Professor Tshilidzi Marwala of South Africa, who took over the role on 1 March 2023. Marwala succeeded David M. Malone of Canada, a two-term Rector who had been serving since 2013.

=== List of rectors ===
#	Rector	Took office	Left office
1	James McNaughton Hester	11 November 1974	10 April 1980
2	Soedjatmoko	10 April 1980	30 March 1987
3	Heitor Gurgulino de Souza	30 March 1987	1 September 1997
4	Hans van Ginkel	1 September 1997	1 September 2007
5	Konrad Osterwalder	1 September 2007	28 February 2013
6	David M. Malone	1 March 2013	28 February 2023
7	Tshilidzi Marwala	1 March 2023	Incumbent

The Council of UNU is the governing board of the university and is composed of 12 members who are appointed by the Secretary-General of the United Nations with the concurrence of the Director-General of UNESCO.

== History ==
The university was formally established in 1972 and began its activities in 1975 following the signature of the permanent headquarters agreement between the United Nations and Japan. The creation of the United Nations University was set in motion by Secretary-General U Thant in 1969.

The UNU headquarters building was designed by renowned architect Dr. Kenzo Tange. The handover ceremony of the building by the Japanese Government took place on 30 June 1992, and the physical move of UNU into the new building was completed the following month. The official inauguration of the UNU headquarters building, held on 17 February 1993, was attended by then Secretary-General of the United Nations, Dr. Boutros Boutros-Ghali.

=== UNU Institutes and Vice-Rectorate ===
Over the years, several Institutes of UNU were created to help with the research initiatives of the United Nations. Most notably, in 2007, a vice-rectorate was established in Bonn (UNU-ViE), Germany, as a way of strengthening UNU's presence in Europe.

=== UNU as a degree-granting institution ===
In December 2009, the UN General Assembly amended the UNU Charter to make it possible for UNU to "grant and confer master's degrees and doctorates, diplomas, certificates and other academic distinctions under conditions laid down for that purpose in the statutes by the Council."

In 2013, the UNU Institute for Sustainability and Peace (UNU-ISP) in Tokyo announced its intention to seek accreditation from the National Institution for Academic Degrees and University Evaluation (NIAD-UE), which is the Japanese accreditation agency for higher education institutions. In 2014, UNU-ISP was consolidated with UNU Institute of Advanced Studies in Yokohama to form the UNU Institute for the Advanced Study of Sustainability (UNU-IAS). UNU-IAS was formally accredited in April 2015, making it the first international organization to be recognized by the NIAD-UE.

In 2014, UNU-MERIT, in collaboration with Maastricht University, started to grant a double degree Master of Science in Public Policy and Human Development. In 2018, the programme was re-accredited by the Accreditation Organisation of the Netherlands and Flanders (NVAO) and received the official EAPAA accreditation by the European Association for Public Administration Accreditation.

== Locations ==
The university has several campuses spread over five continents. Its headquarters are located at the UNU Centre in Tokyo, Japan.

Locations of UNU campuses

== Research ==
The role of the UN University is to generate new knowledge, educate, enhance individual and institutional capacities, and disseminate useful information to relevant audiences. Between 2020 and 2024, the university will be guided by the following four overarching objectives:

1. Pursue policy-relevant programming: by continuing to make policy considerations central to its research programmes and, in addition, actively shaping policy agendas through targeted and strategic collaborations.
2. Invest in a dynamic, innovative, and diverse institutional culture: by encouraging innovation in all dimensions of the university's work, which is undertaken by a diverse and gender-balanced community of scholars, communicators, and management professionals, and by promoting collaboration across spatial and disciplinary boundaries.
3. Strengthen collaboration, communications, and visibility: by leveraging the expertise and networks spread across the UNU system, promoting collaboration, impactful communications undertakings, and ensuring that UNU research meets actual demands.
4. Strive for financial sustainability across UNU's architecture: by addressing the financial constraints that would otherwise undermine ambitious, long-term, research planning, and ensure through participatory management practices that fundraising objectives are realistic, achievable, and complement other strategic priorities.

As prescribed in the United Nations University Strategic Plan 2020–2024, the UN University's academic work falls within three thematic areas:

- Peace and security
- Social change and economic development
- Environment, climate, and energy.

Collectively, these thematic clusters define the programme space within which the UN University undertakes its academic activities. Some key perspectives (such as gender equality, human rights and sustainability) pervade all aspects of the UN University's work.

== Institutes and programmes ==
The academic work of the United Nations University is carried out by a global system of Institutes, Operating Units, and Programmes located in 12 countries around the world.

=== Institutes ===
- Centre for Policy Research (UNU-CPR) in New York, United States
- Institute on Comparative Regional Integration Studies (UNU-CRIS) in Bruges, Belgium
- Institute for Environment and Human Security (UNU-EHS) in Bonn, Germany
- Institute for Integrated Management of Material Fluxes and of Resources (UNU-FLORES) in Dresden, Germany
- Institute for the Advanced Study of Sustainability (UNU-IAS) in Tokyo, Japan
- International Institute for Global Health (UNU-IIGH) in Kuala Lumpur, Malaysia
- Institute for Natural Resources in Africa (UNU-INRA) in Accra, Ghana
- Institute for Water, Environment and Health (UNU-INWEH) in Richmond Hill, Canada
- Institute in Macau (UNU Macau) in Macau, China
- Maastricht Economic and Social Research Institute on Innovation and Technology (UNU-MERIT) in Maastricht, Netherlands
- World Institute for Development Economics Research (UNU-WIDER) in Helsinki, Finland

=== Operating units ===
- Operating Unit on Policy-Driven Electronic Governance (UNU-EGOV) in Guimarães, Portugal

=== Programmes ===
- Programme for Biotechnology in Latin America and the Caribbean (UNU-BIOLAC) in Caracas, Venezuela

=== Former ===
- International Institute for Software Technology (UNU-IIST) in Macau, China (was closed in 2012, later gave origin to UNU-EGOV in 2014 and UNU-CS in 2016)
- Institute on Computing and Society (UNU-CS) in Macau, China
- Institute for Sustainability and Peace (UNU-ISP) in Tokyo, Japan (was combined with UNU Institute of Advanced Studies to form UNU-IAS in 2014)
- UNU Sustainable Cycles (SCYCLE) Programme (migrated to UNITAR in 2022)
- Food and Nutrition Programme for Human and Social Development (UNU-FNP) in Ithaca, United States
- Fisheries Training Programme (UNU-FTP) in Reykjavík, Iceland
- Geothermal Training Programme (UNU-GTP) in Reykjavík, Iceland
- Land Restoration Training Programme (UNU-LRT) in Reykjavík, Iceland
- International Gender Equality Studies Training Programme (UNU-GEST) in Reykjavík, Iceland
- Institute on Globalization, Culture and Mobility (UNU-GCM) in Barcelona, Spain

== See also ==
- Akino Memorial Research Fellowship
- United Nations Institute for Training and Research
- United Nations University Press
- University for Peace
- World Maritime University
