= Rees, Germany =

Rees
- Town
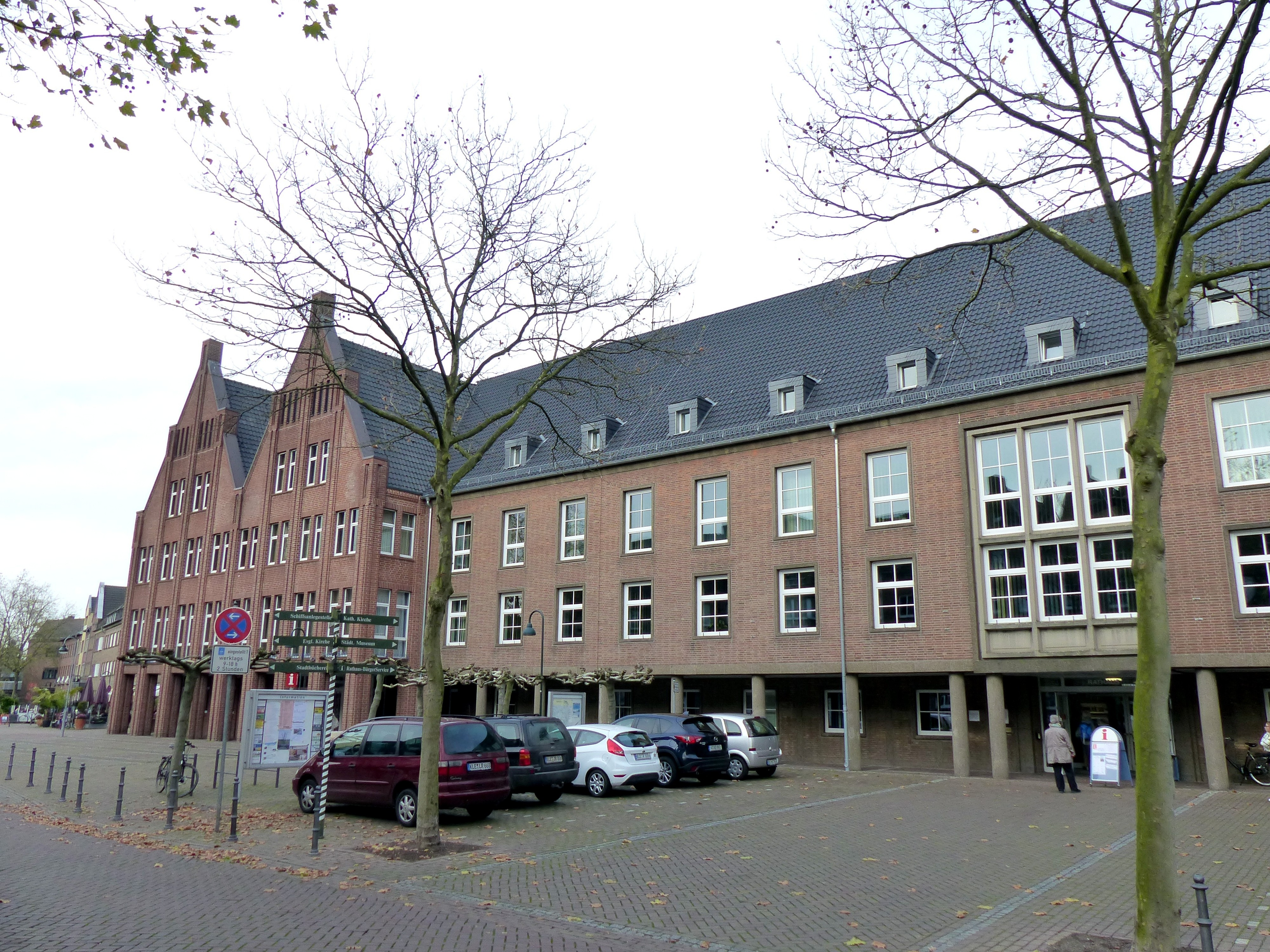
- City Hall

- Flag Coat of arms

- Location of Rees within Kleve district
- Interactive map of Rees
- Location within Germany Location within North Rhine-Westphalia
- Coordinates: 51°46′N 6°24′E
- Country: Germany
- State: North Rhine-Westphalia
- Admin. region: Düsseldorf
- District: Kleve
- Subdivisions: 8

Government
  - Mayor (2020–25): Christoph Gerwers (CDU)

Area
  - Total: 109.86 km^{2} (42.42 sq mi)

Population (2025-12-31)
  - Total: 21,446
  - Density: 195.21/km^{2} (505.60/sq mi)
- Time zone: UTC+01:00 (CET)
  - Summer (DST): UTC+02:00 (CEST)
- Postal codes: 46459
- Dialling codes: 0 28 51; 0 28 50 (Haldern); 0 28 57 (Mehr / Haffen)
- Vehicle registration: KLE
- Website: www.stadt-rees.de

Rees (German pronunciation: [ʁeːs]) is a town in the district of Kleve in the state of North Rhine-Westphalia, Germany. It is located on the right bank of the Rhine, approximately 20 km east of Kleve. The population in 2025 was 21,446. Founded in 1228, Rees is the oldest town in the lower Rhine area.

== Geography ==
Rees is administratively organized in eight communities:

- Community of Bienen
- Community of Empel
- Community of Esserden
- Community of Haffen
- Community of Haldern
- Community of Mehr
- Community of Millingen
- Community of Rees

The neighbouring municipalities are Oude IJsselstreek (province of Gelderland, NL) and Isselburg (district of Borken) in the North, Hamminkeln and Wesel in the East, Xanten in the South (all district of Wesel), and Kalkar and Emmerich in the West.

== History ==
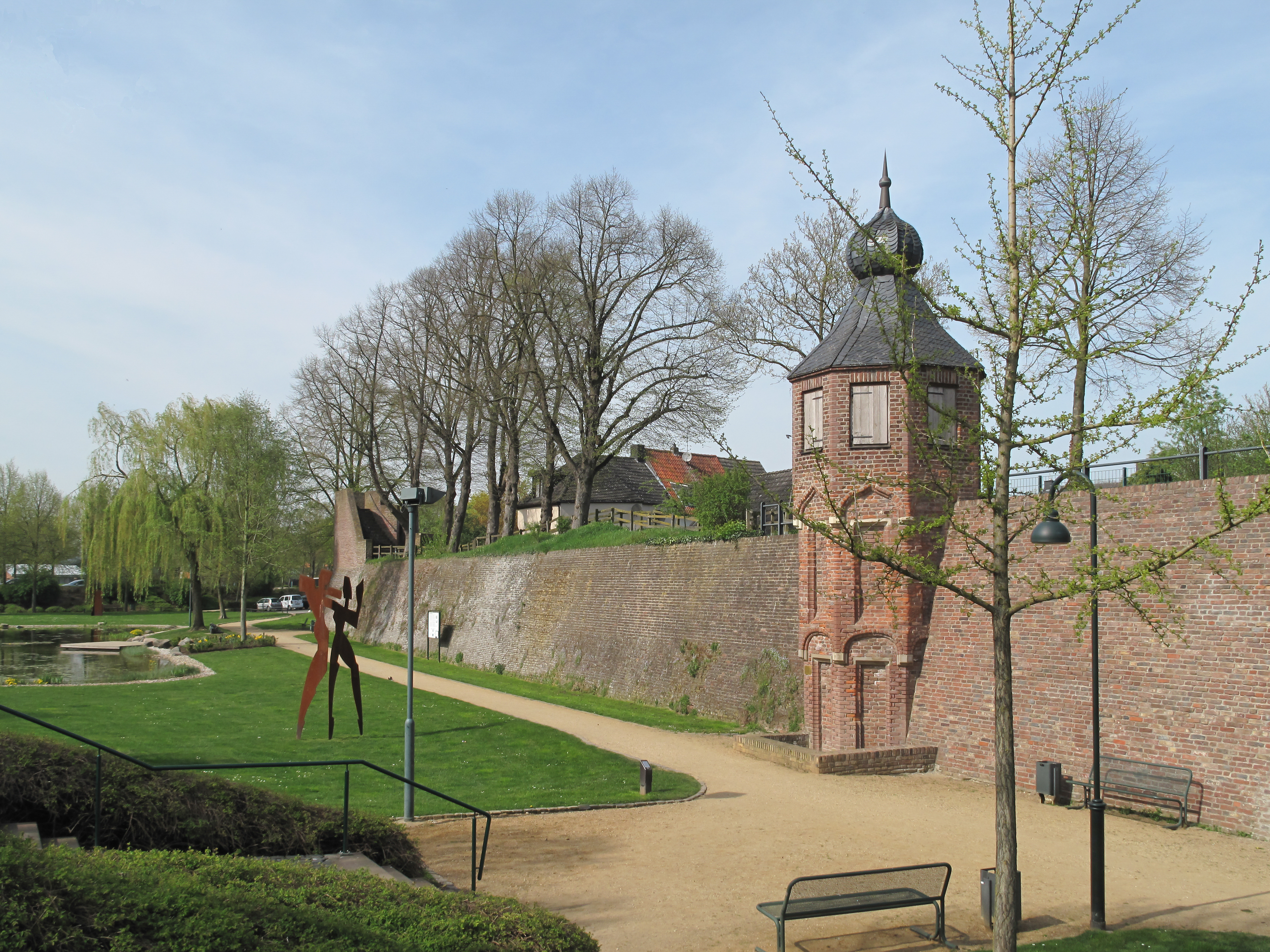
Medieval city wall

The origin of the town is a Frankish settlement established between 500-800 AD. The name Rees most probably goes back to the Kleverlandish term "Rys", which means "willow grove".

The Lower Rhine area was Christianized by the Irish missionary Willibrord between 657-739. Around 1000 the nearby monastery of Aspel was first mentioned.

On 14 July 1228 Rees was granted municipal rights by Heinrich I von Müllenark, Archbishop of Cologne. At that time it had about 600 inhabitants. In 1289/90 the works on a fortified city wall began, which was completed in 1350. In 1392 Rees and the monastery of Aspel became parts of the County of Cleves.

During the Eighty Years War, the town was captured by Spanish troops in 1598. After the death of the last duke of Cleves in 1609 the town belonged to the Margraviate of Brandenburg. Between 1616 and 1625 Rees was occupied by Dutch troops who transformed the town into a huge fortress. In 1701 Rees became a part of the Kingdom of Prussia.

In 1816 Rees became capital of the newly founded Rees District within Regierungsbezirk Kleve. The railway line from Oberhausen to Arnhem was inaugurated in 1856 and a railway station was built near Rees. At the beginning of the 20th century Rees had 4,096 inhabitants of whom 330 were Protestants and 52 were Jews.

From November 1944 to March 25, 1945, a Nazi forced labor camp existed in the city. 5,000 prisoners from various countries, over half of them from the Netherlands, were forced to carry out entrenchment work. The prisoners were housed under inhumane conditions and about 10 percent of the prisoners did not survive the camp.

During the Nazi period, many Jewish inhabitants were deported. Today the only reminders of Jewish culture in Rees are two historic Jewish cemeteries. The city was almost completely destroyed by an Allied air raid on February 16, 1945 during World War II. It became part of North Rhine-Westphalia after the war.

The Rhine bridge of Rees was completed in 1967.

== Population ==
Historical population

Year	Pop.	±% p.a.
1965	15,482	—
1970	16,033	+0.70%
1975	16,665	+0.78%
1980	17,453	+0.93%
1985	17,794	+0.39%
1990	18,616	+0.91%
1995	20,010	+1.45%

Year	Pop.	±% p.a.
2000	21,618	+1.56%
2005	22,559	+0.86%
2010	22,267	−0.26%
2015	21,349	−0.84%
2020	21,030	−0.30%
2025	21,446	+0.39%

Source: Landesdatabank Nordrhein-Westfalen

== Mayor ==
Christoph Gerwers (CDU) has been mayor of Rees since 2009. He was reelected in 2015 with 66.6% of the votes.

== Culture, Tourism and Points of Interest ==
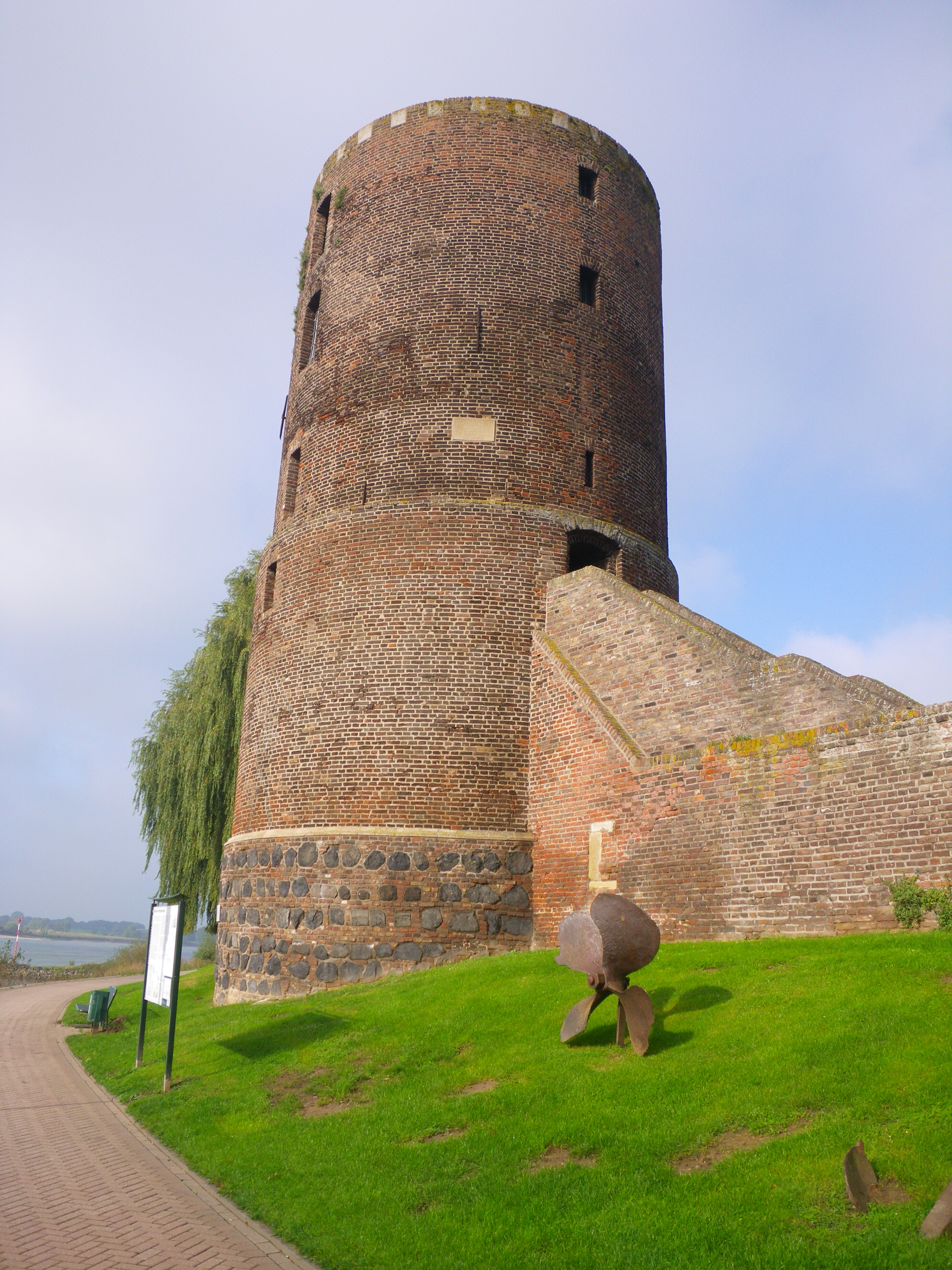
Mühlenturm tower of the medieval city wall

- In the Middle Ages Rees was surrounded by a city wall which was built from 1289 - 1307. Several parts of the wall are well-preserved and can be visited, e.g. the "White Tower" (Weißer Turm) built in 1410 which was used as a prison until the 18th century. The watch tower (Wachturm)near the Jewish cemetery dates from 1480. It was destroyed by bombs in 1945 and rebuilt in 1993. Mühlenturm, the tallest tower, was built in 1470 and used as a windmill. It suffered comparatively little bomb damage and was renovated in 1984. Near the river bank there are further remains of the ancient city fortification. Several casemates have been restored and are open to the public. One of them (Bastei) was built in 1583 and transformed into a war memorial after 1945.
- The municipal Koenraad-Bosman-Museum houses various exhibitions explaining the history of Rees and pieces of art.
- The catholic church "Saint Mary's Ascension" (Sankt Mariä Himmelfahrt) was built from 1820-1828 in a classicist style. It was destroyed in 1945 and rebuilt from 1956-1964.
- The small Protestant church in the Market Place was built in 1624, destroyed in 1945 and reconstructed after the war.
- In the town center, there are many carefully restored wells and water pumps that have become recognizable landmarks. An annual Pumpenkirmes (Ger., "pump fair") celebrates their former role as places for work and gossip.
- The Jewish cemetery of Rees was founded at the beginning of the 18th century. As Jews in medieval Rees were forbidden from being buried in the city their cemetery was laid out on the medieval wall which was 8 metres broad. Thus the graves were safe in case of a Rhine flood. In 1872 the cemetery was closed because it was fully occupied and a new Jewish cemetery was founded in the outskirts of the town on Wesel Road. On 8 of November 1938 the cemetery was desecrated by the Fascists and heavily damaged by bombs on 16 February 1945. Today 24 graves can be seen on the cemetery with the oldest gravestone dating from 1788. The cemetery is not open to the public but the graves on the wall can be seen from the outside.

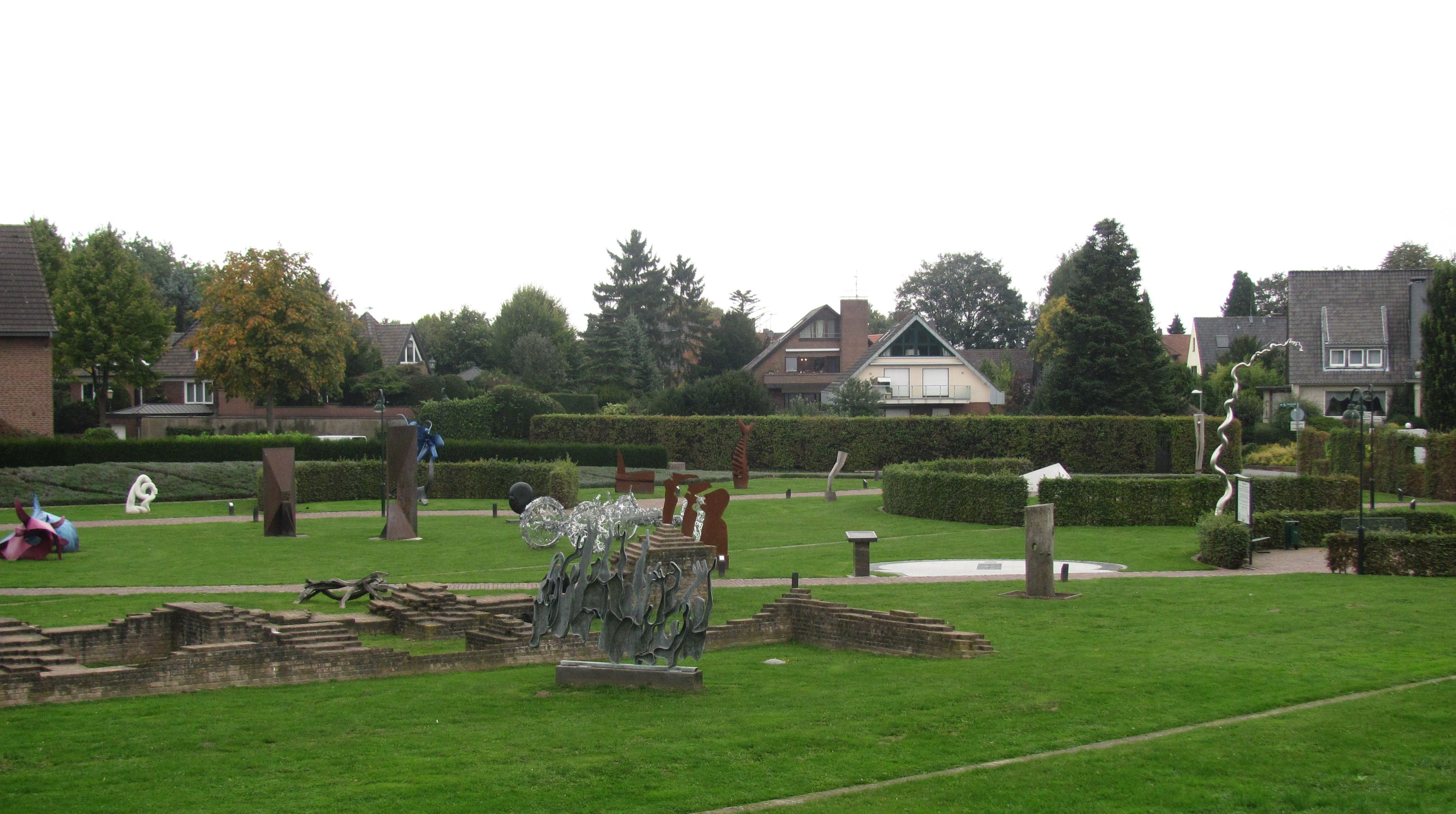
Sculpture Park

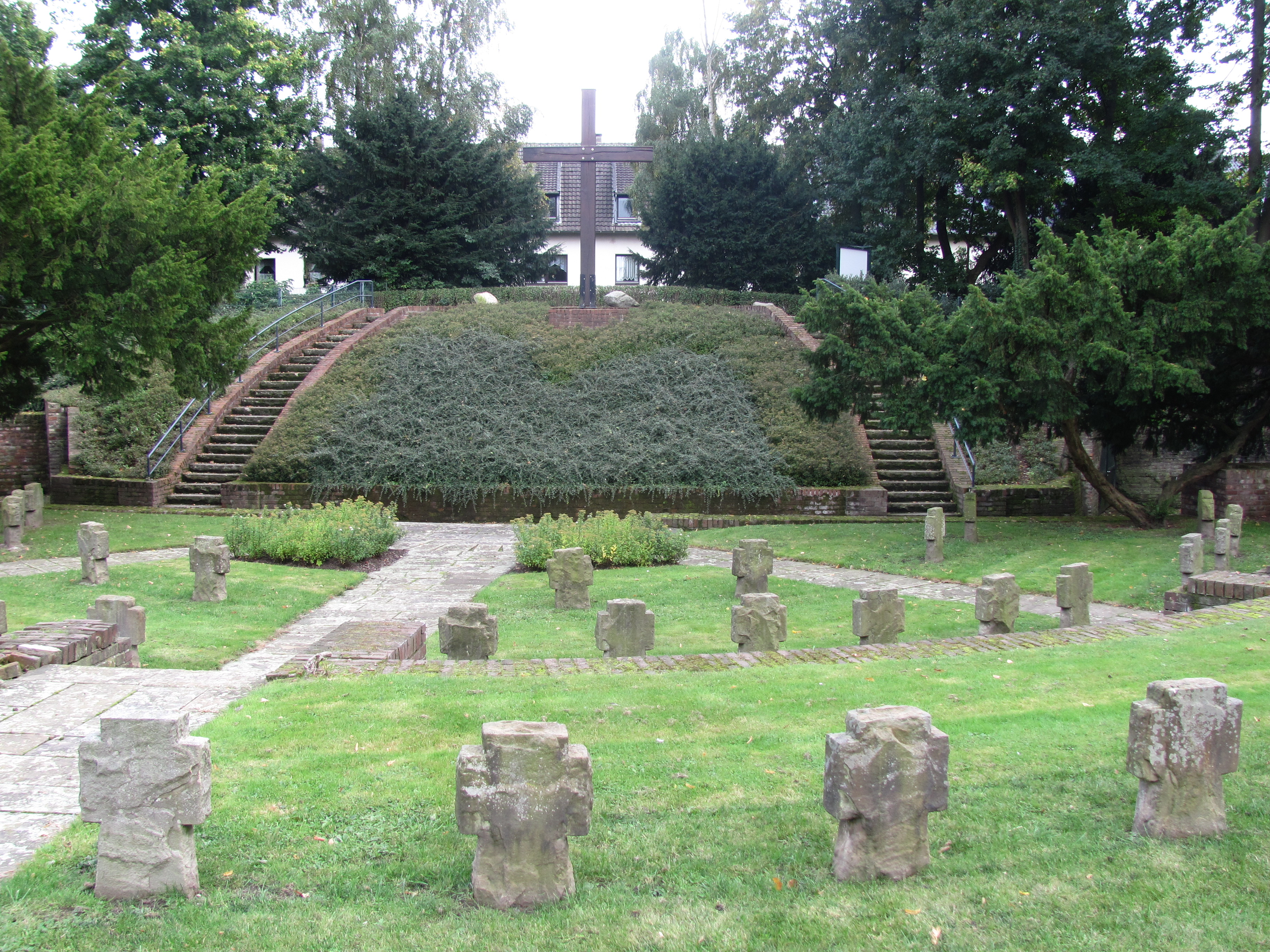
War memorial Bastei

- The sculpture park of Rees was founded in 2003. Pieces of art by German und Dutch artists are exhibited.
- In Millingen, a former village which became a part of Rees in 1974, catholic Saint Quirin's Church dating from the 15th and 16th century is worth a visit.
- Rees has one of the most beautiful Rhine promenades in Germany with restaurants and cafes arranged along the riverbank. Most visitors come from the nearby Netherlands, the Münsterland, and the urban Ruhr Area, from where Rees can be easily accessed via the Autobahn A3 in approx. 30 minutes. Boat tours on the Rhine river (e.g. to Nijmegen, Netherlands) can be taken from the small shipping pier. The town offers a motorhome park, as well as three campsites and many bicycling routes.
- The facilities of the SV (Sportverein) Rees have been used by several national and international soccer teams, most memorably playing host to the national team of Cameroon in 2002.
- Haldern is venue of the Haldern Pop festival, which takes place every August and attracts indie music artists from all over the world as well as thousands of enthusiastic fans.

== Transportation ==
=== Railway ===
Nightjet train to Wien Hbf next to Empel-Rees

The train station Empel-Rees, located about 4 km from the city center, is connected northbound to Emmerich and Arnhem and southbound to Wesel, Oberhausen, Duisburg, Düsseldorf, Cologne, Bonn, and Koblenz. From the station, there is a bus line downtown. There are train stations in Millingen and Haldern as well.

=== Major roads ===
Rees has major road access to the Autobahn A3 and the federal roads B8 (North-South) and B67 (East-West).

=== Inland waterways ===
- The River Rhine

For pedestrians and bicyclists, transfer across the Rhine is provided by two ferries from Easter holidays through October.

=== Nearest airports ===
Distance to Düsseldorf Airport: ca. 75 km

Distance to Airport Weeze (low cost carriers only): ca. 35 km

== Notable people ==
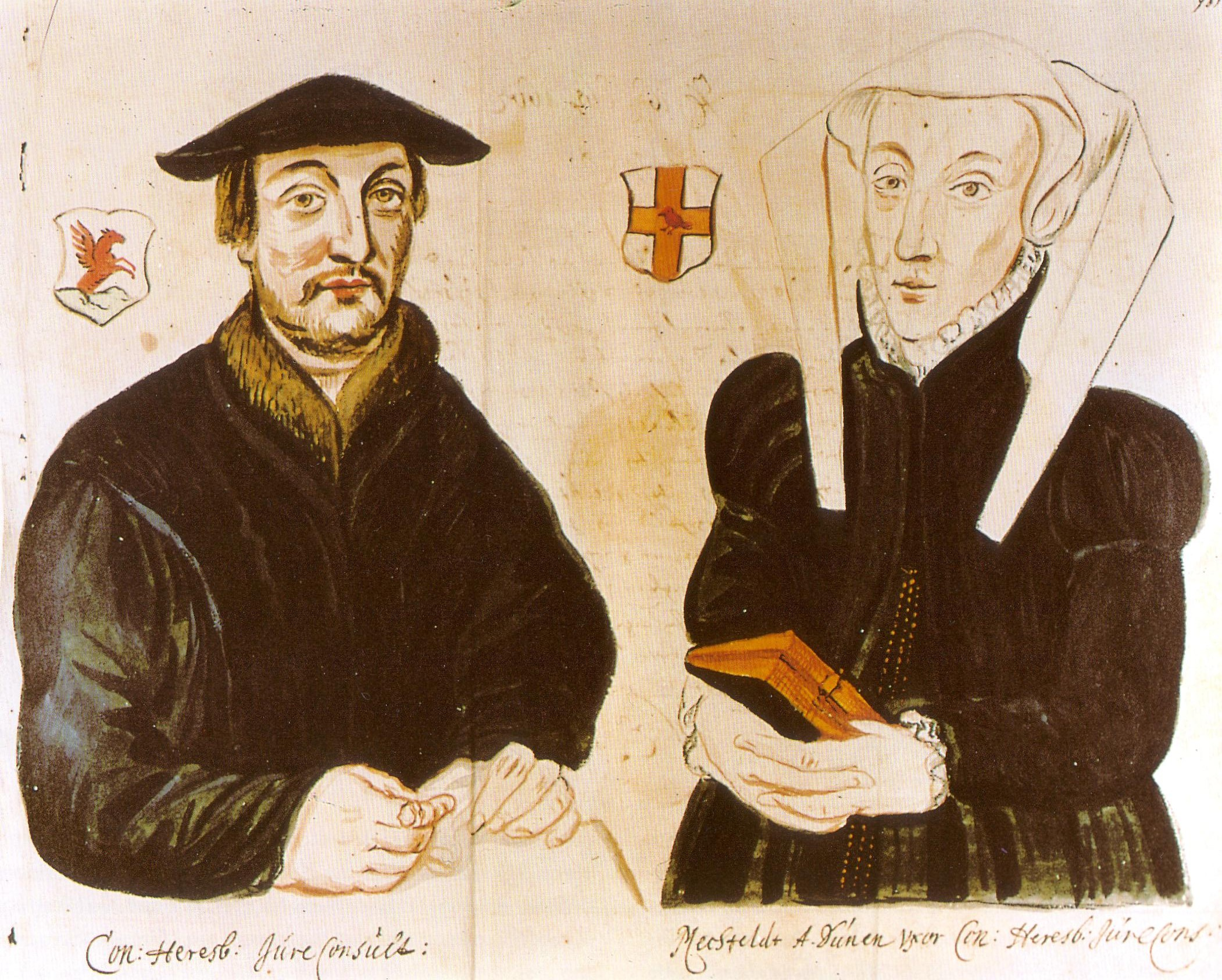
Konrad Heresbach and Mechthild van Duyenen

- Mirko Boland (born 1987), footballer (Eintracht Braunschweig)
- Konrad Heresbach (1496–1576), German Humanist
- Karl Leisner (1915–1945), martyr of the Catholic Church, who died as a result of mistreatment in concentration camp Dachau
- Vlado Stenzel (born 1934), handball player and coach
- Reiner Pommerin (1943–2024), historian
- Franz-Josef Tenhagen (born 1952), former footballer and coach
