= 1893 San Roque hurricane =

Category 3 Atlantic hurricane in 1893

Hurricane Three 1893 San Roque hurricane
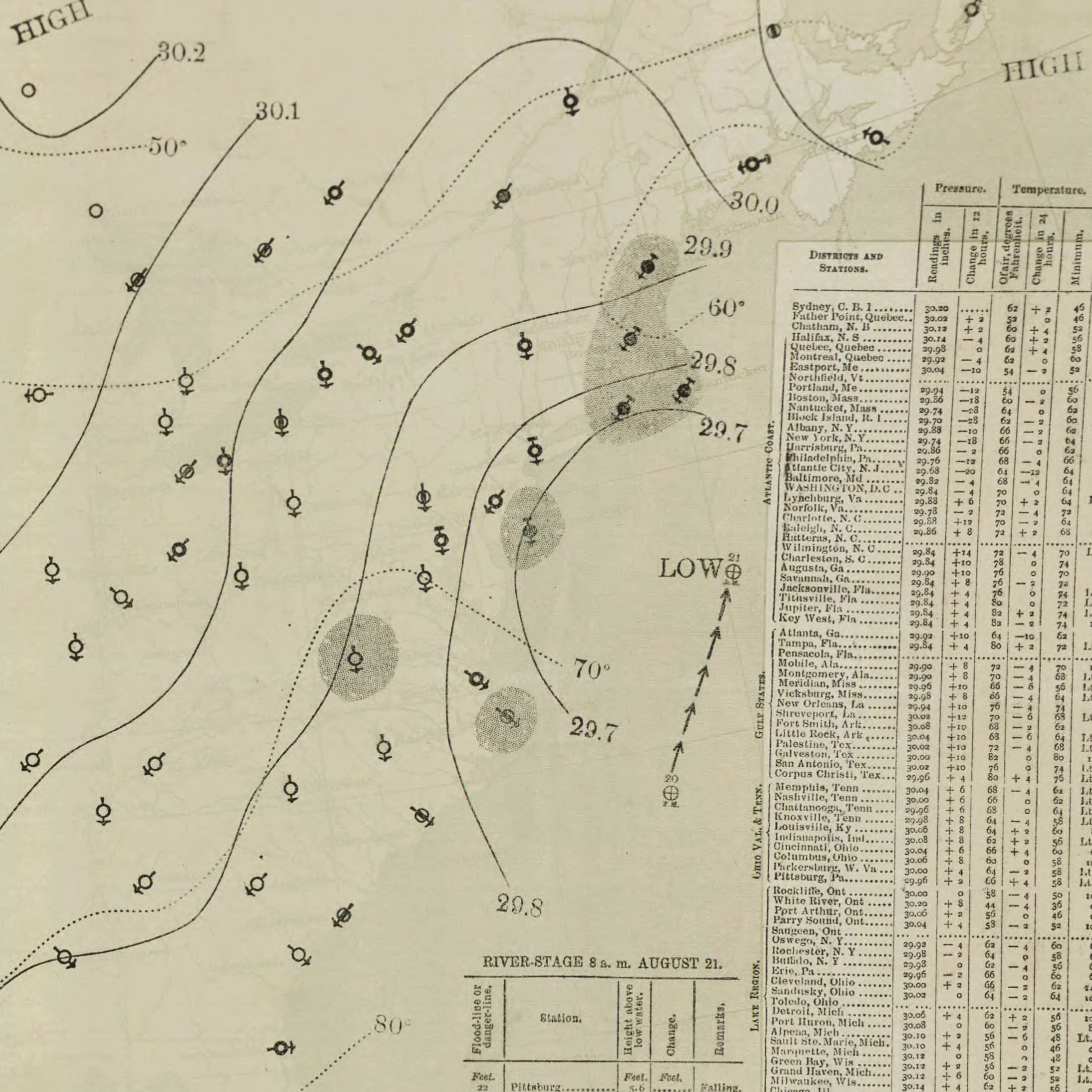
- Surface weather analysis of the hurricane on August 21, just off the Mid-Atlantic U.S. coast

Meteorological history
- Formed: August 13, 1893
- Dissipated: August 22, 1893

Category 3 major hurricane
- 1-minute sustained (SSHWS/NWS)
- Highest winds: 120 mph (195 km/h)

Overall effects
- Fatalities: 37
- Damage: Unknown
- Areas affected: Lesser Antilles, Puerto Rico, New England, Atlantic Canada
- Part of the 1893 Atlantic hurricane season

Hurricane San Roque was a destructive tropical cyclone in August 1893 that principally affected Puerto Rico, eastern New England, and Atlantic Canada. Its informal name in Puerto Rico arises from the feast day of Saint Roch, or San Roque in Spanish, which coincided with the hurricane's landfall on that island. (Note: The Puerto Rican tradition of referring to hurricanes by the names of Catholic saints being commemorated on the corresponding feast days was among the earliest informal tropical cyclone naming systems, and lasted for centuries prior to the introduction of standardized naming conventions. This was the third storm bearing the local name "San Roque". See also: Calendar of saints § Connection to tropical cyclones.) It was the third known hurricane of the 1893 Atlantic hurricane season. The system was first observed on August 13 at low latitudes east of the Lesser Antilles. It grew to be a powerful, slow-moving hurricane in the Caribbean Sea, and on August 17 struck Puerto Rico at the equivalence of Category 3 on the modern-day Saffir–Simpson scale. The eye crossed the island from southeast to northwest in about seven hours. A prolonged period of strong winds caused widespread destruction on the island, most notably along the northern coast. Large numbers of homes sustained varying degrees of damage, with flimsy shacks belonging to poor workers faring the worst; many families were left homeless, and four people were killed. Telegraph communications were severed across the island. In addition to the intense winds, several days of heavy rainfall in interior sectors triggered extensive river flooding. The combined effects of rain and wind destroyed fields of crops, most notably coffee and sugar cane.

On August 19, the hurricane began to turn northeastward, accelerate, and gradually weaken. Although its center remained far from the United States, heavy rainfall and gale-force winds overspread the country's East Coast on August 20 and 21. Eastern New England experienced conditions akin to a particularly bad nor'easter, with winds as high as 72 mph (116 km/h) recorded on Block Island. Across Rhode Island and Massachusetts, grain crops were flattened and orchards were stripped of their fruits. The racing yacht Volunteer was badly damaged, and a fishing schooner sank off Nantucket; only one of the seven crew members managed to survive, by clinging to debris for 33 hours. Later that day, the now-rapidly moving cyclone made landfall in Nova Scotia. Damage to utility wires in Halifax cut power and communications services, and a child was killed by a downed power line. The storm wrought havoc on ships and boats throughout Atlantic Canada, becoming "one of the most notorious marine storms in the history of Nova Scotia". The greatest maritime tragedy was the wreck of the steamship Dorcas and its barge, Etta Stewart, which struck a rocky shoal while underway east of Halifax. Dorcas capsized and was driven ashore, while the barge broke up in the pounding surf. All crew members and passengers on the two vessels, totaling 24 people, were killed. Two more people died when their boat sank on Trinity Bay in Newfoundland, for a storm total of 37 fatalities.

== Meteorological history ==
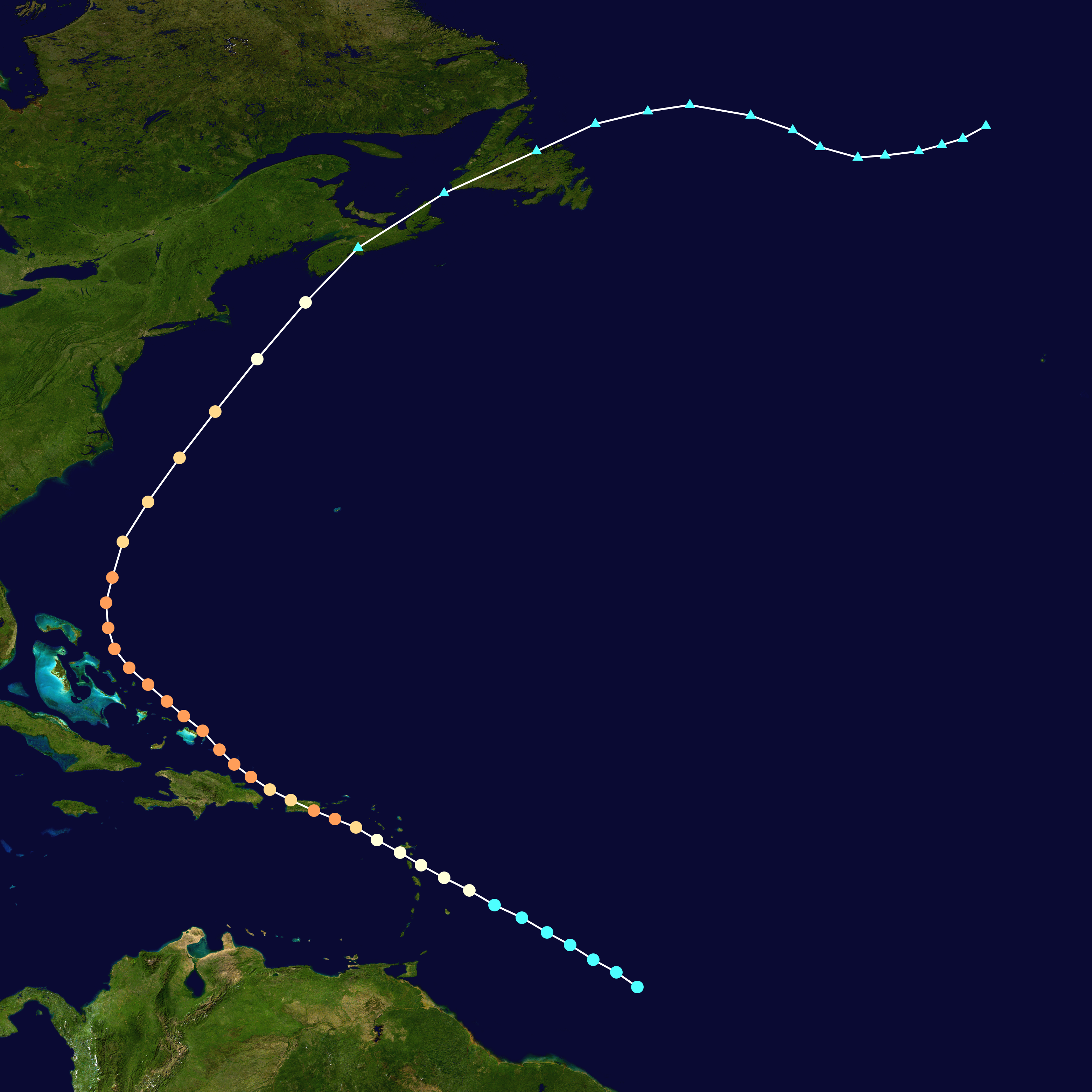
Map plotting the storm's track and intensity, according to the Saffir–Simpson scale Map key Saffir–Simpson scale Tropical depression (≤38 mph, ≤62 km/h) Tropical storm (39–73 mph, 63–118 km/h) Category 1 (74–95 mph, 119–153 km/h) Category 2 (96–110 mph, 154–177 km/h) Category 3 (111–129 mph, 178–208 km/h) Category 4 (130–156 mph, 209–251 km/h) Category 5 (≥157 mph, ≥252 km/h) Unknown Storm type Tropical cyclone Subtropical cyclone Extratropical cyclone, remnant low, tropical disturbance, or monsoon depression

Because of scarce meteorological observations, little is known about Hurricane San Roque's early history. According to contemporaneous accounts, it most likely originated in the Intertropical Convergence Zone off the northern coast of South America. In the Atlantic hurricane database, its formation as a tropical storm is entered on August 13, corresponding with the first observation of the system, about 730 mi (1,170 km) east of Trinidad and Tobago. It crossed the Lesser Antilles island arc on August 15, passing between Dominica and Guadeloupe. The intensifying cyclone moved toward the northwest and by 18:00 UTC on August 16, it was centered very close to St. Croix. Upon receiving the first report of the storm from Saint Thomas, the U.S. Weather Bureau issued a special bulletin relaying the current position of the hurricane, forecasting its recurvature by August 21, and advising shipping interests to take necessary precautions. At 00:00 UTC on August 17, the cyclone made landfall near Patillas, Puerto Rico, as the equivalent of a Category 3 major hurricane on the modern-day Saffir–Simpson scale. Modern reanalysis efforts estimated the intensity at landfall through the severity of wind damage in Puerto Rico, which was consistent with F2 on the Fujita scale. The eye was marked by a period of stark calm as it crossed the island such that during its passage, some people believed the storm to be over. At San Juan, to the north of the center path, barometric pressure fell to 987.8 mbar (29.17 inHg). Approximately seven hours after moving ashore, the center exited Puerto Rico between Isabela and Quebradillas.

On August 18, weather stations along the Atlantic coast of the Southeastern U.S. started to register the hurricane's distant influence. It passed over or close to the Turks and Caicos Islands. While situated northeast of the Bahamas on August 19, the hurricane began its recurvature to the north and ultimately northeast. Late on August 20 and into the following day, gales and heavy rainfall overspread the Mid-Atlantic and Northeast coasts. The hurricane weakened as it gained latitude and early on August 21, it passed approximately 185 mi (300 km) east of Cape Hatteras. Later that day, the accelerating storm passed within 150 mi (240 km) of Nantucket. At 00:00 UTC on August 22, it was one of four active hurricanes in the Atlantic Ocean, and the first of three to impact the U.S. East Coast in the span of eight days; Hurricane Four would strike western Long Island on August 24, and Hurricane Six ravaged the Sea Islands on August 28 before moving northward along the Eastern Seaboard.

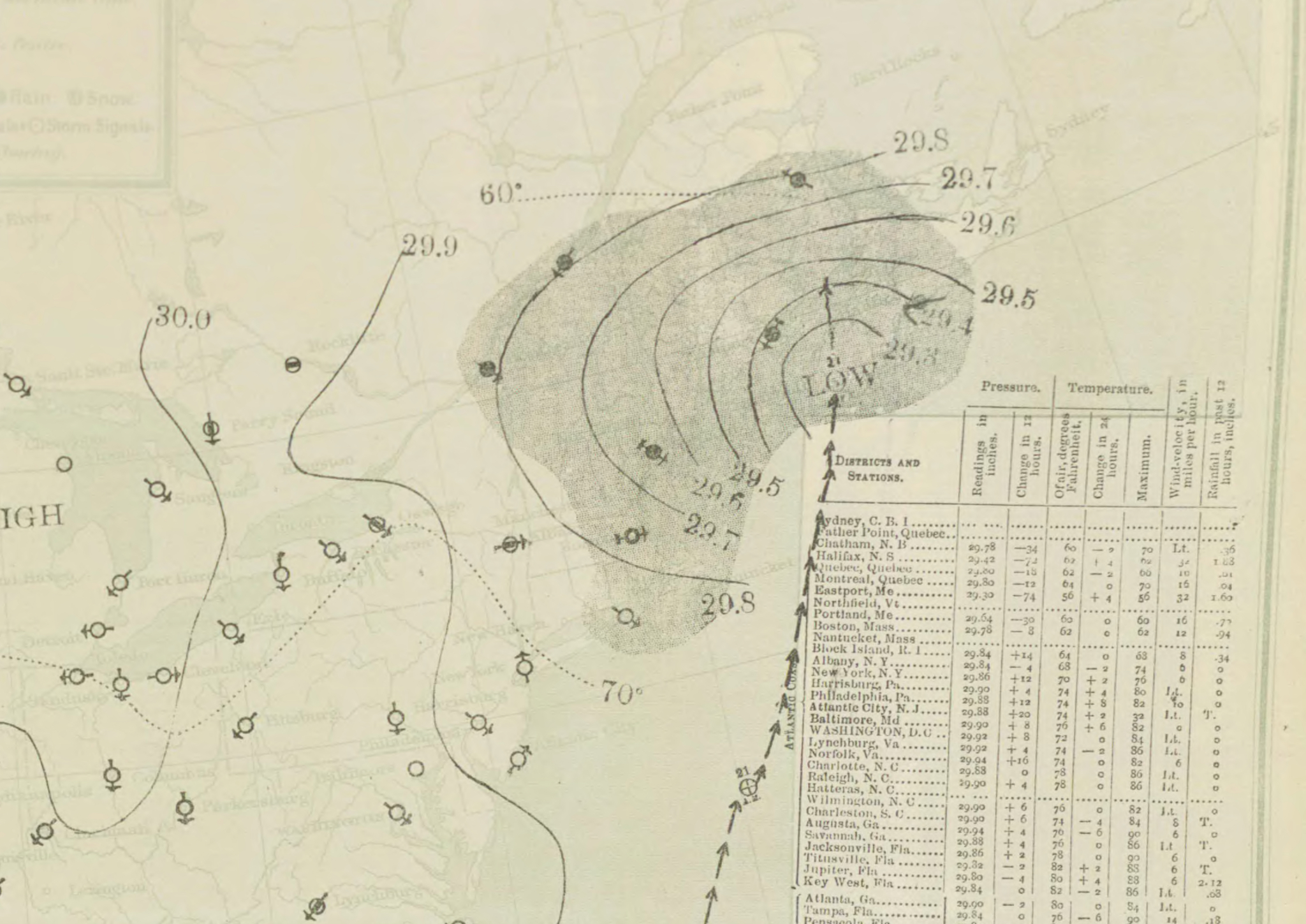
Weather map of the hurricane nearing extratropical transition as it approaches landfall in Nova Scotia late on August 21

Though some modern researchers catalogued the system as a hurricane on its final approach to Nova Scotia, the official Atlantic hurricane reanalysis project found no conclusive evidence of hurricane-force winds in Canada. In the early morning hours of August 22, the storm made landfall in Nova Scotia via St. Margarets Bay, as an extratropical cyclone. Its northeasterly path placed greater Halifax in the typically intense right-front quadrant of the storm center; this would not be repeated until Hurricane Juan in 2003. After rapidly crossing Nova Scotia, the extratropical system impacted the island of Newfoundland. Its remnants continued eastward into the North Atlantic for several more days; its documented course ends on August 25.

== Impact ==
The intensifying hurricane brought stormy conditions to the Lesser Antilles from Martinique to the Virgin Islands. In Saint Thomas, boats and docks were damaged, trees were blown down, and houses were unroofed.

=== Puerto Rico ===
For the first time in Puerto Rico's history, warning flags were used to alert the public of the approaching hurricane. Officials in San Juan first hoisted cautionary red flags during the mid-morning on August 16, upgraded three hours later to more urgent yellow and blue signals, and finally to black flags to mark the cyclone's onslaught. By mid-afternoon the Port of San Juan was closed; although orders were given to evacuate ships from the port, the short notice and lack of available tugboats meant some vessels had to ride out the storm at anchor, exposed to the elements. Ships at dock were required to be unloaded of their cargo. When the severity of the hurricane became clear, local officials ensured moorings were secure and orchestrated the positioning of ships to minimize risk of collisions. Bus and tram services were suspended as conditions worsened, leaving many residents unable to reach their homes for the night.

On the night of August 16–17, winds of 55 mph (89 km/h) and 50 mph (80 km/h) were recorded in San Juan and Mayagüez, respectively, before both recording anemometers were blown away. It was the long duration of the storm, rather than its intensity alone, which made it so destructive. The northern coast suffered most as the storm wrought havoc on crops, telegraph infrastructure, and buildings of varying construction quality. Poorly built shacks and huts, the residences of impoverished workers, fared the worst. In Camuy, the storm destroyed up to 20 houses, uprooted trees, and sparked two small fires; in the aftermath, the mayor appointed a special commission to facilitate the transfer of relief funds to storm victims. Many of the homeless families received donations from neighbors to help cover basic expenses. The winds unroofed many small huts near the shore of Arecibo, forcing their residents to flee for cover, and knocked down wooden and brick fences. The local telegraph station was rendered inoperative, slowing the initial spread of damage reports. Both the city and outlying rural areas of Manatí incurred widespread damage, with dozens of thatch roofs blown off and some homes left uninhabitable. The basement of a colecturía, or tithe barn, was provided as temporary shelter to poor and injured storm victims. Numerous people in Hatillo were left homeless, and reports there described trees being blown far from where they once stood. Severe damage befell Vega Baja, with at least 28 houses destroyed and many banana, coconut, and other fruit trees toppled. Eight houses were destroyed in Isabela, and one family required rescue after its home was crushed under the dislocated roof of an adjacent building. Many poor families became homeless; some were offered shelter in the homes of local government and Civil Guard officials. A church atrium in the town was destroyed.

Many more peasant huts were destroyed in Bayamón, along with the roofs of more substantial structures. All telegraph wires and poles in the community were blown down. Seven or eight houses were destroyed in Trujillo Alto. The effects proved less severe than feared in Utuado, though banana plantations suffered. In Dorado, numerous houses were damaged and six were destroyed, their residents forced to seek shelter in government buildings. The storm was not as severe in San Juan as in other towns, although destruction remained widespread. One hospital was badly damaged, with the roof over the maternity ward peeled away. Timbers and metal roofing tiles were blown a great distance from the structure, and patients had to be transferred to a nearby military hospital. Another hospital in the Puerta de Tierra subbarrio was also unroofed. With telegraph wires downed in all directions, San Juan initially had no contact with the rest of the island. Many gas lanterns were broken. Palm and fruit trees were uprooted throughout the city, while garden fences and awnings were blown down. Many houses, huts, businesses, and public facilities around San Juan sustained varying degrees of structural damage. Several houses in the nearby town of Cataño were demolished.

Heavy rainfall lasted two to three days in some locations. San Juan recorded 2.36 in (60 mm) of precipitation. Further inland, rivers overflowed their banks with the torrential rainfall, inundating wide tracts of low-lying terrain. Among the major rivers flooded were the Río Grande de Arecibo, Río Grande de Manatí, and Santiago. Floodwaters ruined harvests of crops like rice, corn, and sugar cane. One farmer in Humacao, near the eastern coast, reported the loss of about 80 acres (32 ha) of sugar cane fields. The neighborhood of Marina in Gurabo had to be evacuated due to river flooding. The mayor of the town started a donation drive for poor families. One worker on a hacienda died, and his burial was delayed until flooding in the local cemetery receded. Many railways and thoroughfares, including the road between Cataño and Bayamón, were made impassable by both fallen trees and deep floodwaters. With mail routes blocked and telegraph communications severed, the full extent of the destruction was slow to be revealed. On the day after the storm, workers began to clear railways and reestablish communications.

Several ships were destroyed and others left stranded on the beach. The schooner Enriqueta broke free and crashed into a pier; the sloop Tomasito grounded out, crushing its keel; and another sloop, the Maria Artau, went ashore at Palo Seco, with all hands saved by another crew. At Arecibo, the British schooner Robbie Godfrey broke free from its moorings in port while being loaded with sugar. The ship was driven aground and destroyed, along with its cargo, but all hands were able to reach the shore with the assistance of rescue brigades. One crewman was hospitalized for an arm injury. The schooner Martiniguesi, loaded with cattle en route to Martinique, went ashore at Maunabo, with one crewman and numerous head of cattle killed. The sloop Pepito was lost at Cataño. Sea baths along the shore were destroyed.

Among all agricultural losses, that of the year's coffee crop was most significant. Losses to the coffee harvest in Lares alone were estimated at 500,000 Puerto Rican pesos. In some localities, only crops in sheltered valleys survived. As much as 60% of the coffee harvest was lost to the storm in Comerío. The storm was locally referred to as "San Roque" since it began on the feast day of Saint Roch, known as San Roque in Spanish. It was among the last significant tropical cyclones to affect Puerto Rico before the island came under United States rule in 1898. Some contemporary accounts drew comparisons to the devastating San Felipe hurricane of 1876. The hurricane caused four known fatalities in Puerto Rico.

=== United States ===
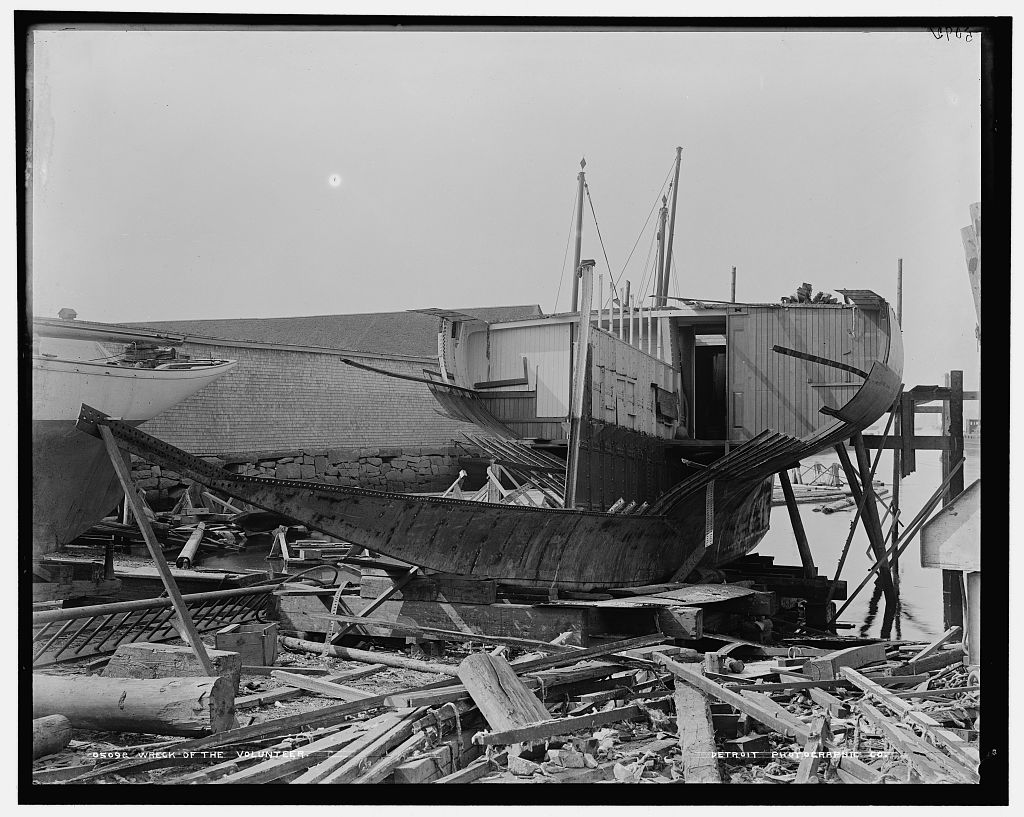
The racing yacht Volunteer was badly damaged by the storm in Massachusetts.

On the far western periphery of the hurricane, parts of Florida experienced gusty winds, reaching 35 mph (56 km/h) in Key West and 38 mph (61 km/h) in Jupiter, on August 20. A closer pass by New England the following day resulted in severe nor'easter-like conditions, with winds peaking at 72 mph (116 km/h) on Block Island and 52 mph (84 km/h) on Nantucket. In Woods Hole, Massachusetts, winds up to 60 mph (97 km/h) were reported. Tropical storm-force winds extended north to Eastport. The Hartford Courant described the hurricane "the most severe August storm known for many years" in Chatham; in Oak Bluffs (then called Cottage City) on Martha's Vineyard, it was "without a precedent during the summer season" according to The Boston Globe. The U.S. Weather Bureau had predicted bad weather for several days, and warning signals were raised along the coast 24 hours before onset. Consequently, shipping interests generally endured the storm without major losses.

Throughout Cape Cod and the Islands, trees, fences, and utility wires were blown down. Apple and pear trees were stripped of their fruit, and vegetable crops suffered. Floodwaters inundated streets and cellars while the driving rain forced its way inside east-facing walls. Many roads were littered with the broken branches of large trees; some smaller trees and shrubs were uprooted entirely. Part of the Nantucket Railroad was washed out at Tom Nevers Head, and wharves on the island received minor damage. In the mid-morning on August 21, the Portland, Maine-based fishing schooner Mary Lizzie sank in heavy seas off Nantucket. Six of the seven crew members drowned. The one survivor held to floating debris for 33 hours until he was rescued by a passing steamship. The racing yacht Volunteer, winner of the 1887 America's Cup, broke free from her anchorage and was tossed onto the rocks near the entrance to Hadley's Harbor on Naushon Island, Massachusetts. Pounding seas battered the vessel, breaking up much of its deck and flooding the hull. After an unsuccessful attempt by another yacht to rescue Volunteer with the storm still raging, a tugboat was able to dislodge the stricken craft and tow her to a nearby wharf. The storm disabled several ships around Martha's Vineyard, including the schooners Sarah Louise and Clara Jane, both of which were damaged, and the sloop Cassie, left stranded on the shore. Numerous other fishing vessels lost their anchors, sails, or seine fishing boats. The maritime havoc extended westward to New Jersey's Sandy Hook, where a yacht was wrecked.

President Grover Cleveland sheltered in his summer home of Gray Gables during the storm. His yacht was narrowly saved from being swept ashore. Rainfall in Boston commenced in the late evening of August 20 and continued through the following afternoon, totaling 1.65 in (42 mm); the Charles River breached its banks, flooding the Cambridgeport neighborhood of Cambridge up to 3 ft (0.9 m) deep. At Nantasket Beach in the town of Hull, immense swells drew crowds of onlookers, photographers, and artists before the surf action began damaging boardwalks and carnival game booths. Roads in Plymouth were littered with broken tree limbs, and several pleasure craft in Plymouth Harbor were blown aground.

Great damage to grain crops also plagued the neighboring state of Rhode Island. Two sailors were rescued after their boat capsized in Newport Harbor. A fishing schooner drifted to sea with its crew aboard; it was ultimately rescued by a tug south of the Brenton Reef Light. Numerous ships rode out the storm in the shelter of Dutch Island in the West Passage of Narragansett Bay, being "tossed like cockle shells on the swirling waters" as described by the Fall River Daily Evening News . One of Ethel Swift's two anchor chains broke, resulting in a wreck on the western shore of the bay. The schooner's crew of four was safely rescued. Further up the bay, three ships were blown aground on Prudence Island. A yacht race set for August 21 around Newport was postponed because of the bad weather. Some 17 fire alarm call boxes in Charlestown, Rhode Island, were rendered inoperative, so firefighters had to patrol the town continuously through the night of August 20–21.

=== Canada ===
Though in a weakened state, the cyclone battered the Atlantic provinces of Canada. Writing for Cape Breton's Magazine, Michael L. MacDonald wrote that it was "one of the most notorious marine storms in the history of Nova Scotia". There, the storm came to be known as the "Second Great August Gale", in reference to a catastrophic hurricane in August 1837. Throughout the Maritimes, dozens of large ships were stranded or destroyed. Warning signals were hoisted in Nova Scotia on the evening of August 20, and ultimately lowered near midday on August 22.

In Halifax, rain and wind began in the early afternoon on August 21 and grew in severity through the night. The city was plunged into darkness and cut off from the outside world as electricity and communications wires fell. Severed power lines sparked small fires and posed a hazard to public safety; a young girl was electrocuted and killed by a live wire, and two more people received non-life-threatening shocks while attempting to recover her body. Parks, public gardens, and cemeteries throughout the city suffered extensive damage, with many large trees destroyed. Many ships and boats were wrecked or blown ashore in Halifax Harbour. In one instance, after colliding with a wharf and being struck by two pontoon boats, the schooner Janie R.'s cargo of lime swelled with the influx of seawater such that the ship burst open. Trees were uprooted and chimneys toppled in Liverpool. The storm was less severe in Yarmouth, at the western end of the province, but still washed out streets and blew down trees. The winds damaged trees, fences, and some buildings in Amherst, and flattened crops in the surrounding countryside. In Cumberland County, the Palmerston Bridge over the upper Pugwash Harbor was badly damaged, and two barques were blown ashore at Northport. Several schooners were wrecked along the shores of Cape Breton; in Ingonish, two ships were left stranded on the shore and six fishing boats drifted out to sea. Residents of the rural community fled their homes at the height of the storm to seek shelter in nearby valleys.

Late on the night of August 21, the steamship Dorcas, with barge Etta Stewart in tow, wrecked on the notoriously hazardous reef surrounding Shut-In Island, near the entrance to Three Fathom Harbour. Both vessels were loaded with coal en route from Sydney to Halifax. It is likely that the barge took on water in the heavy seas, making it impossible to steer and causing both ships to drift inexorably toward shore in the strong southerly winds. After hitting the rocks, the steamer overturned, losing its engine, boilers, and cargo, and came to rest inverted on the beach. The barge broke up, littering the shore with timbers. All crew-members and passengers, totaling 24 people, were killed: Dorcas carried a crew of 10, plus the chief engineer's pregnant wife and 4 children in their care, while 8 crewmen and one passenger were on Etta Stewart. All bodies but one were recovered. The small community of Louisbourg, home to 16 of the victims and many of their families, was left reeling, and a rare government inquiry into the disaster was opened; it concluded that the wreck was beyond the control of Captain Angus Ferguson of Dorcas, who "sacrificed his own life in his endeavour to save those on board the two vessels". The commissioner of the inquiry acknowledged that cutting the barge free may have increased the chance of survival for the crew and passengers of Dorcas, but dismissed this as a viable option:

"It may be considered by some that it would have been more prudent and wise for the master of the Dorcas to have disconnected his steamer from the barge at some safe time before approaching the breakers, in order to enable his vessel to reach off shore and thus have made an effort to save the larger number of people on board the steamer at the sacrifice of the less number of people on board the barge.
"Had Captain Ferguson, however, acted in such a manner and been successful in saving the steamer with those on board, he would have forever been branded as a coward when he reached the land and laid himself open to the serious charge of deliberately and wilfully sacrificing the lives of many human beings for the sake of saving his own. To a brave man this would have been intolerable and it must be acknowledged that in acting as he did he displayed the genuine characteristics of a noble seaman, when, amidst the dangers of such a hurricane and wild sea, he met death at the post of duty."

Despite the tragedy at Shut-In Island, the loss of life in Nova Scotia was considered low relative to the large number of shipwrecks.

Extensive storm damage, including downed trees and telegraph wires, collapsed barns, and sunk vessels along the coast, was reported in parts of New Brunswick. At Point Escuminac, winds blew at 60 to 62 mph (97 to 100 km/h) for three hours and many fishing boats were blown ashore. A similar situation presented itself further north in Shippagan. The cyclone severed communications between Prince Edward Island and the mainland, and inflicted widespread damage upon the province. Streets in the capital city of Charlottetown were strewn with downed tree limbs; in rural sectors, barns were destroyed. A stretch of breakwater in Souris was washed out. Fishing boats in Tignish were shattered. In Percé, on the eastern tip of Quebec's Gaspé Peninsula, 14 fishing vessels were destroyed. The extratropical remnants of the cyclone continued to produce strong winds over Newfoundland, ruining crops and damaging homes that were under construction. The sinking of a boat in Trinity Bay resulted in the drowning deaths of two men, including member of the General Assembly of Newfoundland, David C. Webber. St. John's reported powerful winds that toppled trees.

== See also ==
- 1899 San Ciriaco hurricane – followed a similar path across Puerto Rico, becoming the deadliest hurricane in the island's history
- Climate of Puerto Rico
- List of New England hurricanes
- List of Canada hurricanes
