= Climate of Puerto Rico =

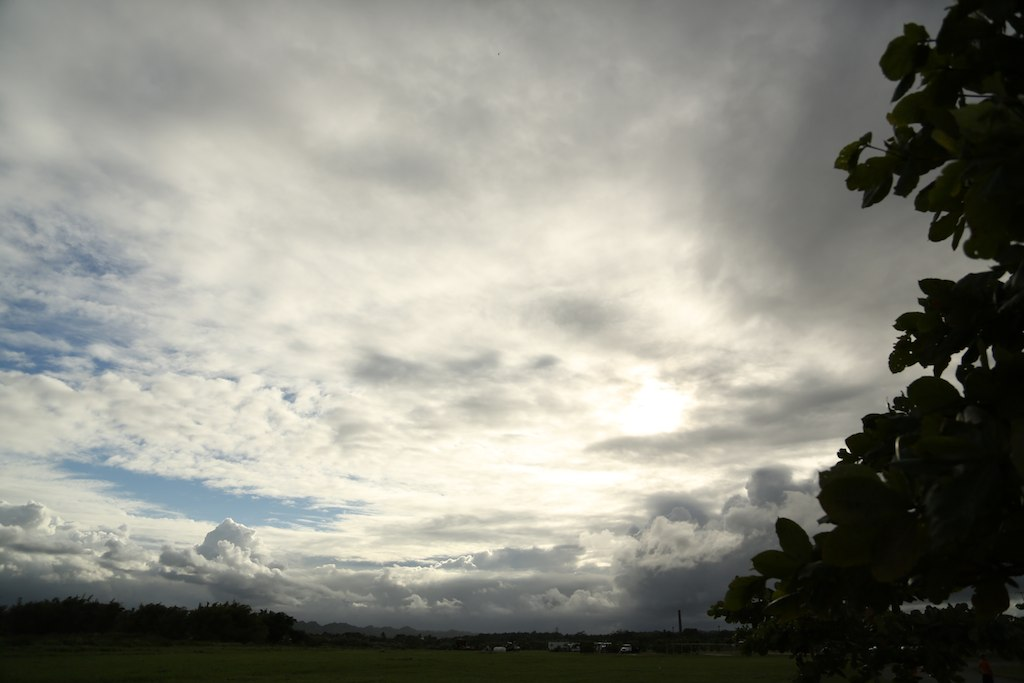
Clouds over Parque Ecológico in Dorado

The climate of Puerto Rico in the Köppen climate classification is predominantly tropical rainforest. Temperatures throughout the year are warm to hot, averaging near 85 °F (29 °C) in lower elevations and 70 °F (21 °C) in the mountains. Easterly trade winds pass across the island year round while the rainy season stretches from April into November. The relatively cool trade winds are blocked by the mountains of the Cordillera Central which causes rain shadows and sharp variations in the temperature and wind speed over short distances. About a quarter of the average annual rainfall for Puerto Rico occurs during tropical cyclones, which are more frequent during La Niña years.

== Temperature ==
Köppen climate types of Puerto Rico

Temperatures range from 70 to 90 °F (21 to 32 °C) in the lower elevations, while higher elevations in the central part of the island experience temperatures between 61 and 80 °F (16 and 27 °C) year round. The temperature in the south is a few degrees higher than the north. Between winter and summer, there is only a temperature swing of around 6 °F (3.3 °C). Coastal water temperatures average between 77 °F (25 °C) in February to 87 °F (31 °C) in August. The highest temperature ever recorded was 103 °F (39 °C) at San Lorenzo, while the lowest temperature ever recorded was 38 °F (3 °C) at Aibonito. Frost and freezes have occurred in the highest mountains at almost twice the elevation of Aibonito, where the low temperature in winter is in the low 40s (5C). The average temperature in San Juan is over 80°F (27C). It is the only location in plant hardiness zone 13b on the USDA map, with temperatures rarely falling to the low 60s.

Climate data for Adjuntas Substation. Elevation: 1,720 feet (520 m).
| Month | Jan | Feb | Mar | Apr | May | Jun | Jul | Aug | Sep | Oct | Nov | Dec | Year |
|---|---|---|---|---|---|---|---|---|---|---|---|---|---|
| Mean daily maximum °F (°C) | 77 (25) | 78 (26) | 81 (27) | 81 (27) | 83 (28) | 84 (29) | 85 (29) | 85 (29) | 85 (29) | 84 (29) | 82 (28) | 80 (27) | 82 (28) |
| Mean daily minimum °F (°C) | 55 (13) | 54 (12) | 55 (13) | 60 (16) | 66 (19) | 68 (20) | 69 (21) | 69 (21) | 69 (21) | 66 (19) | 60 (16) | 57 (14) | 62 (17) |
Source: Southeast Regional Climate Center

Climate data for Aibonito. Elevation 2,320 feet (710 m).
| Month | Jan | Feb | Mar | Apr | May | Jun | Jul | Aug | Sep | Oct | Nov | Dec | Year |
|---|---|---|---|---|---|---|---|---|---|---|---|---|---|
| Mean daily maximum °F (°C) | 74 (23) | 75 (24) | 77 (25) | 78 (26) | 79 (26) | 80 (27) | 81 (27) | 81 (27) | 81 (27) | 80 (27) | 78 (26) | 75 (24) | 78 (26) |
| Mean daily minimum °F (°C) | 59 (15) | 59 (15) | 61 (16) | 63 (17) | 65 (18) | 66 (19) | 67 (19) | 67 (19) | 67 (19) | 66 (19) | 65 (18) | 63 (17) | 64 (18) |
Source: Southeast Regional Climate Center

Climate data for Cerro Maravilla. Elevation: 3,950 feet (1,200 m).
| Month | Jan | Feb | Mar | Apr | May | Jun | Jul | Aug | Sep | Oct | Nov | Dec | Year |
|---|---|---|---|---|---|---|---|---|---|---|---|---|---|
| Mean daily maximum °F (°C) | 65 (18) | 67 (19) | 69 (21) | 69 (21) | 71 (22) | 73 (23) | 75 (24) | 75 (24) | 73 (23) | 72 (22) | 71 (22) | 68 (20) | 71 (22) |
| Mean daily minimum °F (°C) | 45 (7) | 45 (7) | 49 (9) | 55 (13) | 59 (15) | 61 (16) | 62 (17) | 62 (17) | 61 (16) | 61 (16) | 59 (15) | 50 (10) | 56 (13) |
Source: Southeast Regional Climate Center

Climate data for Lajas Substation. Elevation 120 feet (37 m).
| Month | Jan | Feb | Mar | Apr | May | Jun | Jul | Aug | Sep | Oct | Nov | Dec | Year |
|---|---|---|---|---|---|---|---|---|---|---|---|---|---|
| Mean daily maximum °F (°C) | 84 (29) | 86 (30) | 87 (31) | 88 (31) | 89 (32) | 91 (33) | 92 (33) | 93 (34) | 93 (34) | 90 (32) | 89 (32) | 87 (31) | 89 (32) |
| Mean daily minimum °F (°C) | 60 (16) | 61 (16) | 62 (17) | 65 (18) | 70 (21) | 72 (22) | 74 (23) | 75 (24) | 74 (23) | 71 (22) | 66 (19) | 62 (17) | 68 (20) |
Source: Southeast Regional Climate Center

Climate data for Ponce 4 E. 40 feet (12 m).
| Month | Jan | Feb | Mar | Apr | May | Jun | Jul | Aug | Sep | Oct | Nov | Dec | Year |
|---|---|---|---|---|---|---|---|---|---|---|---|---|---|
| Mean daily maximum °F (°C) | 86 (30) | 86 (30) | 87 (31) | 87 (31) | 88 (31) | 90 (32) | 90 (32) | 91 (33) | 90 (32) | 89 (32) | 88 (31) | 87 (31) | 88 (31) |
| Mean daily minimum °F (°C) | 67 (19) | 66 (19) | 67 (19) | 69 (21) | 72 (22) | 74 (23) | 74 (23) | 73 (23) | 73 (23) | 72 (22) | 70 (21) | 68 (20) | 70 (21) |
Source: Southeast Regional Climate Center

=== Temperature records ===
Climate data for Puerto Rico
| Month | Jan | Feb | Mar | Apr | May | Jun | Jul | Aug | Sep | Oct | Nov | Dec | Year |
|---|---|---|---|---|---|---|---|---|---|---|---|---|---|
| Record high °F (°C) | 98.1 (36.7) | 99.7 (37.6) | 99.5 (37.5) | 102.6 (39.2) | 104.0 (40.0) | 102.9 (39.4) | 104.7 (40.4) | 104.0 (40.0) | 103.1 (39.5) | 104.5 (40.3) | 98.6 (37.0) | 97.0 (36.1) | 104.7 (40.4) |
| Record low °F (°C) | 39.7 (4.3) | 39.6 (4.2) | 37.4 (3.0) | 43.2 (6.2) | 49.3 (9.6) | 50.0 (10.0) | 55.4 (13.0) | 55.6 (13.1) | 48.7 (9.3) | 45.9 (7.7) | 41.9 (5.5) | 40.1 (4.5) | 37.4 (3.0) |
Source 1: Pogoda.ru.net - Climate Monitor — Meteo.ru - Baseline Climatological Data Sets
Source 2: NOAA NCDC - Climate Data Online

== Climate data ==
Climate data for San Juan, Puerto Rico (Luis Muñoz Marín International Airport), 1991–2020 normals, (Note: Mean monthly maxima and minima (i.e. the expected highest and lowest temperature readings at any point during the year or given month) calculated based on data at said location from 1991 to 2020.) extremes 1898–present (Note: Official records for San Juan were kept at downtown from November 1898 to December 1955 and at Luis Muñoz Marín International Airport since January 1956.)
| Month | Jan | Feb | Mar | Apr | May | Jun | Jul | Aug | Sep | Oct | Nov | Dec | Year |
|---|---|---|---|---|---|---|---|---|---|---|---|---|---|
| Record high °F (°C) | 92 (33) | 96 (36) | 96 (36) | 97 (36) | 96 (36) | 97 (36) | 95 (35) | 97 (36) | 97 (36) | 98 (37) | 96 (36) | 94 (34) | 98 (37) |
| Mean maximum °F (°C) | 87.5 (30.8) | 88.2 (31.2) | 90.0 (32.2) | 91.7 (33.2) | 92.3 (33.5) | 92.7 (33.7) | 92.0 (33.3) | 92.8 (33.8) | 93.7 (34.3) | 92.7 (33.7) | 90.3 (32.4) | 88.0 (31.1) | 94.3 (34.6) |
| Mean daily maximum °F (°C) | 83.2 (28.4) | 83.8 (28.8) | 84.7 (29.3) | 86.2 (30.1) | 87.4 (30.8) | 89.0 (31.7) | 88.7 (31.5) | 89.1 (31.7) | 89.2 (31.8) | 88.6 (31.4) | 86.1 (30.1) | 84.2 (29.0) | 86.7 (30.4) |
| Daily mean °F (°C) | 77.6 (25.3) | 77.8 (25.4) | 78.6 (25.9) | 80.1 (26.7) | 81.6 (27.6) | 83.1 (28.4) | 83.1 (28.4) | 83.5 (28.6) | 83.4 (28.6) | 82.7 (28.2) | 80.5 (26.9) | 78.8 (26.0) | 80.9 (27.2) |
| Mean daily minimum °F (°C) | 71.9 (22.2) | 71.8 (22.1) | 72.4 (22.4) | 74.0 (23.3) | 75.7 (24.3) | 77.2 (25.1) | 77.6 (25.3) | 77.8 (25.4) | 77.5 (25.3) | 76.7 (24.8) | 74.9 (23.8) | 73.3 (22.9) | 75.1 (23.9) |
| Mean minimum °F (°C) | 68.3 (20.2) | 68.7 (20.4) | 69.2 (20.7) | 70.7 (21.5) | 72.1 (22.3) | 74.0 (23.3) | 74.1 (23.4) | 74.2 (23.4) | 74.3 (23.5) | 73.7 (23.2) | 71.7 (22.1) | 70.0 (21.1) | 67.8 (19.9) |
| Record low °F (°C) | 61 (16) | 62 (17) | 60 (16) | 64 (18) | 66 (19) | 66 (19) | 69 (21) | 68 (20) | 69 (21) | 67 (19) | 65 (18) | 62 (17) | 60 (16) |
| Average precipitation inches (mm) | 4.07 (103) | 2.58 (66) | 2.18 (55) | 4.60 (117) | 5.54 (141) | 4.66 (118) | 6.02 (153) | 6.29 (160) | 6.50 (165) | 5.21 (132) | 7.37 (187) | 4.85 (123) | 59.87 (1,521) |
| Average precipitation days (≥ 0.01 in) | 18.4 | 15.3 | 13.1 | 14.3 | 16.5 | 15.1 | 19.0 | 19.8 | 18.3 | 17.7 | 20.6 | 20.2 | 208.3 |
| Average relative humidity (%) | 74.0 | 72.4 | 71.0 | 71.3 | 74.9 | 75.5 | 75.9 | 76.4 | 76.4 | 76.9 | 76.2 | 74.7 | 74.6 |
| Average dew point °F (°C) | 67.1 (19.5) | 66.6 (19.2) | 66.7 (19.3) | 68.2 (20.1) | 71.1 (21.7) | 72.9 (22.7) | 73.4 (23.0) | 73.6 (23.1) | 73.2 (22.9) | 72.7 (22.6) | 70.9 (21.6) | 68.5 (20.3) | 70.4 (21.3) |
| Mean monthly sunshine hours | 237.4 | 231.2 | 282.0 | 268.3 | 255.2 | 259.4 | 280.8 | 267.8 | 234.7 | 227.2 | 202.4 | 217.4 | 2,963.8 |
| Percentage possible sunshine | 69 | 72 | 76 | 71 | 63 | 65 | 69 | 68 | 64 | 63 | 60 | 64 | 67 |
| Average ultraviolet index | 8 | 10 | 12 | 12 | 12 | 12 | 12 | 12 | 12 | 10 | 9 | 8 | 11 |
Source 1: NOAA (relative humidity and sun 1961–1990)
Source 2: The Weather Channel, Weather Atlas (UV)

== Dust from the Sahara ==
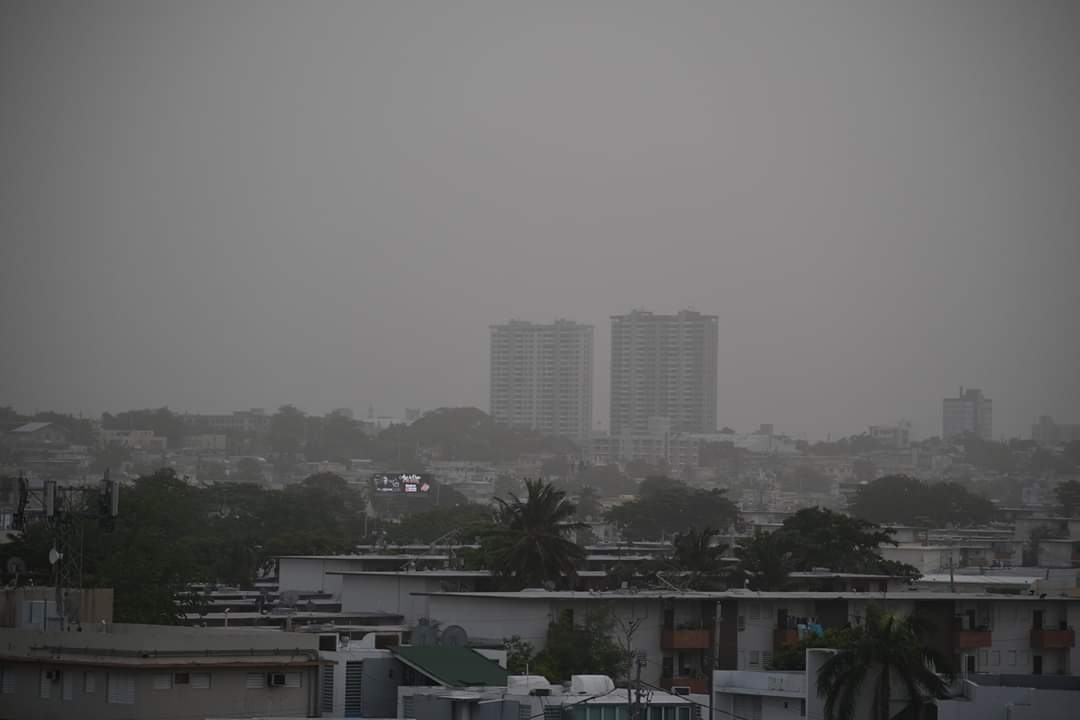
Sahara Dust blanketing the island June 22, 2020

For years, meteorologists have been studying dust that arrives from the Sahara Desert, and they believe the dust which is carried over the Atlantic to Puerto Rico causes a whole series of changes in Puerto Rico's climate and environment, from haze to heat.

== Wind ==
Persistent 19-knot (22 mph; 35 km/h) trade winds move from east to west across the island year round. When the trades winds are lighter, sea breeze and land breeze circulations dominate. Every five years or so a hurricane brings high intensity wind.

The island's infrastructure is extremely susceptible to high winds. For example, when Hurricane Maria made landfall on the island in 2017 at Category 5 strength, 100% of the power grid was lost.

== Rainfall ==
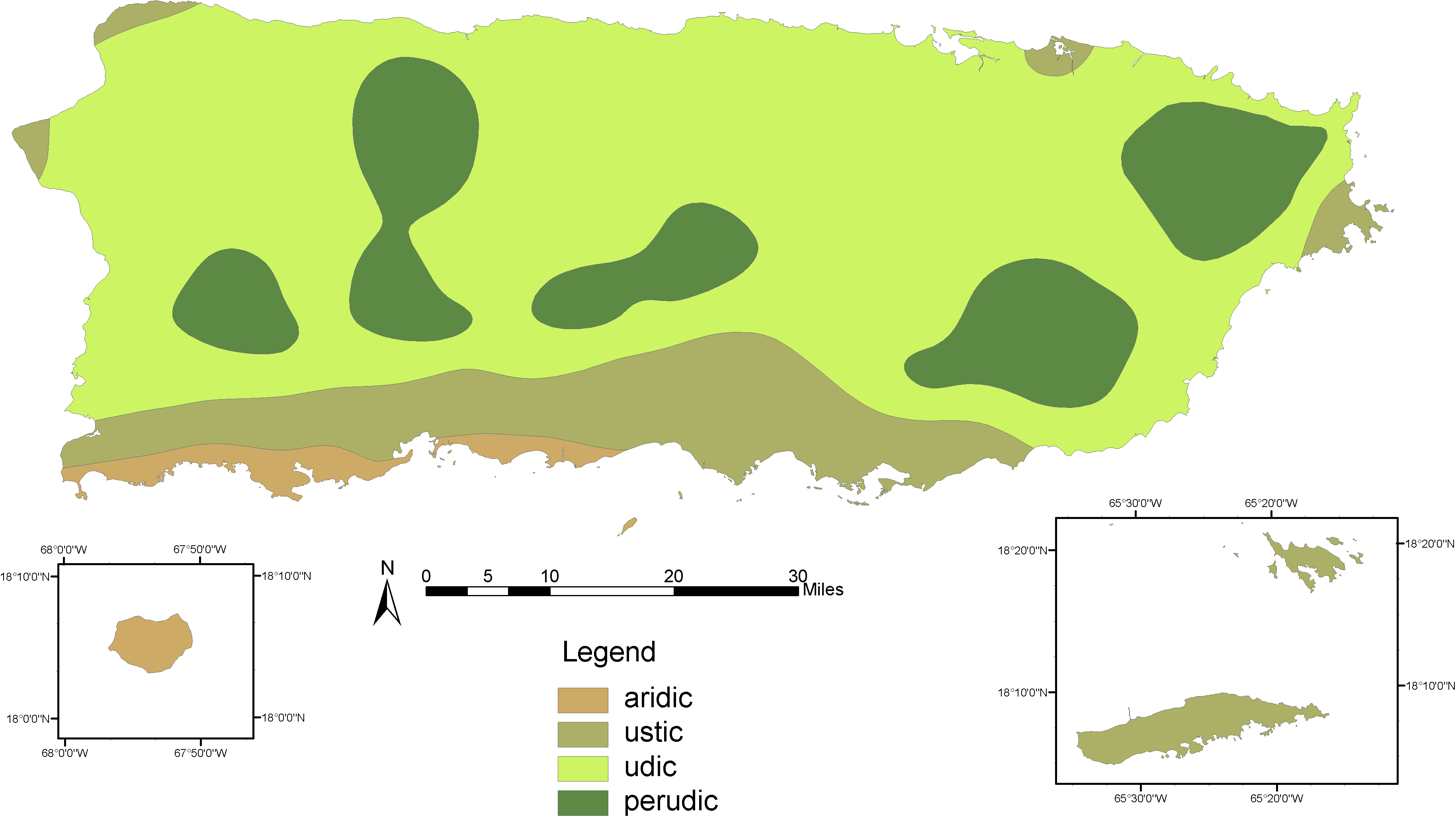
Moisture regimes of Puerto Rico

There is a pronounced rainy season from April to November and a dry season from December to March, causing some drought. Due to the island's topography, rainfall varies greatly across the island. Pico del Este averages 171.09 inches (4,346 mm) of rainfall yearly while Magueyes Island averages only 29.32 inches (745 mm) a year.

== Severe weather ==
Wettest tropical cyclones and their remnants in Puerto Rico Highest-known totals
| Precipitation | | | Storm | Location | Ref. |
| Rank | mm | in | Storm | Location | Ref. |
|---|---|---|---|---|---|
| 1 | 1,058.7 | 41.68 | Fifteen 1970 | Jayuya 1 SE | |
| 2 | 962.7 | 37.90 | Maria 2017 | Caguas | |
| 3 | 845.6 | 33.29 | Eloise 1975 | Dos Bocas | |
| 4 | 822.9 | 32.40 | Fiona 2022 | Marueno | |
| 5 | 804.4 | 31.67 | Isabel 1985 | Toro Negro Forest | |
| 6 | 775.0 | 30.51 | Georges 1998 | Jayuya | |
| 7 | 751.8 | 29.60 | San Felipe II 1928 | Adjuntas | |
| 8 | 662.2 | 26.07 | Hazel 1954 | Toro Negro Tunnel | |
| 9 | 652.5 | 25.69 | Klaus 1984 | Guavate Camp | |
| 10 | 596.4 | 23.48 | Hortense 1996 | Cayey 1 NW | |

- Puerto Rico experiences the Atlantic hurricane season, similar to the remainder of the Caribbean Sea and North Atlantic oceans. On average, a quarter of its annual rainfall is contributed by tropical cyclones, which is more prevalent during periods of La Niña than El Niño. A cyclone of tropical storm strength passes near Puerto Rico, on average, every five years. A hurricane passes in the vicinity of the island, on average, every 11 years. Two Category 5 hurricanes have struck the island since 1851: the Lake Okeechobee Hurricane of September 1928, and Hurricane Irma of September 2017.
- Sometimes waterspouts form off the coast during showers and thunderstorms, particularly off the west coast, with tornadoes and hailstorms possible in the inner sea. These thunderstorms may be formed due to tropical waves, tropical cyclones, and frontal boundaries which become stationary across the region between fall and spring.
- In September 2017, Puerto Rico was hit by Category 5 Hurricane Irma, which had maximum sustained winds of 290 km/h (180 mph). It was and still is the strongest hurricane to hit the island in recorded history. While the eye itself stayed offshore (passing about 60 miles from land), the eye-wall skirted the island's northeastern portion, including the population centre of San Juan. Nearly 70% of the island lost power from the hurricane. The power and infrastructure grid were severely weakened by this storm, leading to more damage from Hurricane Maria, two weeks later.
- Hurricane Maria made landfall on Puerto Rico on Wednesday, September 20, 2017 near the Yabucoa municipality at 10:15 UTC (6:15am local time) as a high-end Category 4 hurricane with winds of 155 mph (249 km/h). In addition, heavy rainfall occurred throughout the territory, peaking at 37.9 in (960 mm) in Caguas. The eyewall replacement cycle that caused María to weaken to Category 4 strength also caused the eye to triple in size as the diameter expanded 9–28 nmi (10–32 mi) prior to landfall. This change in size caused the area exposed to high-intensity winds on the island to be far greater. Widespread flooding affected San Juan, waist-deep in some areas, and numerous structures lost their roof.

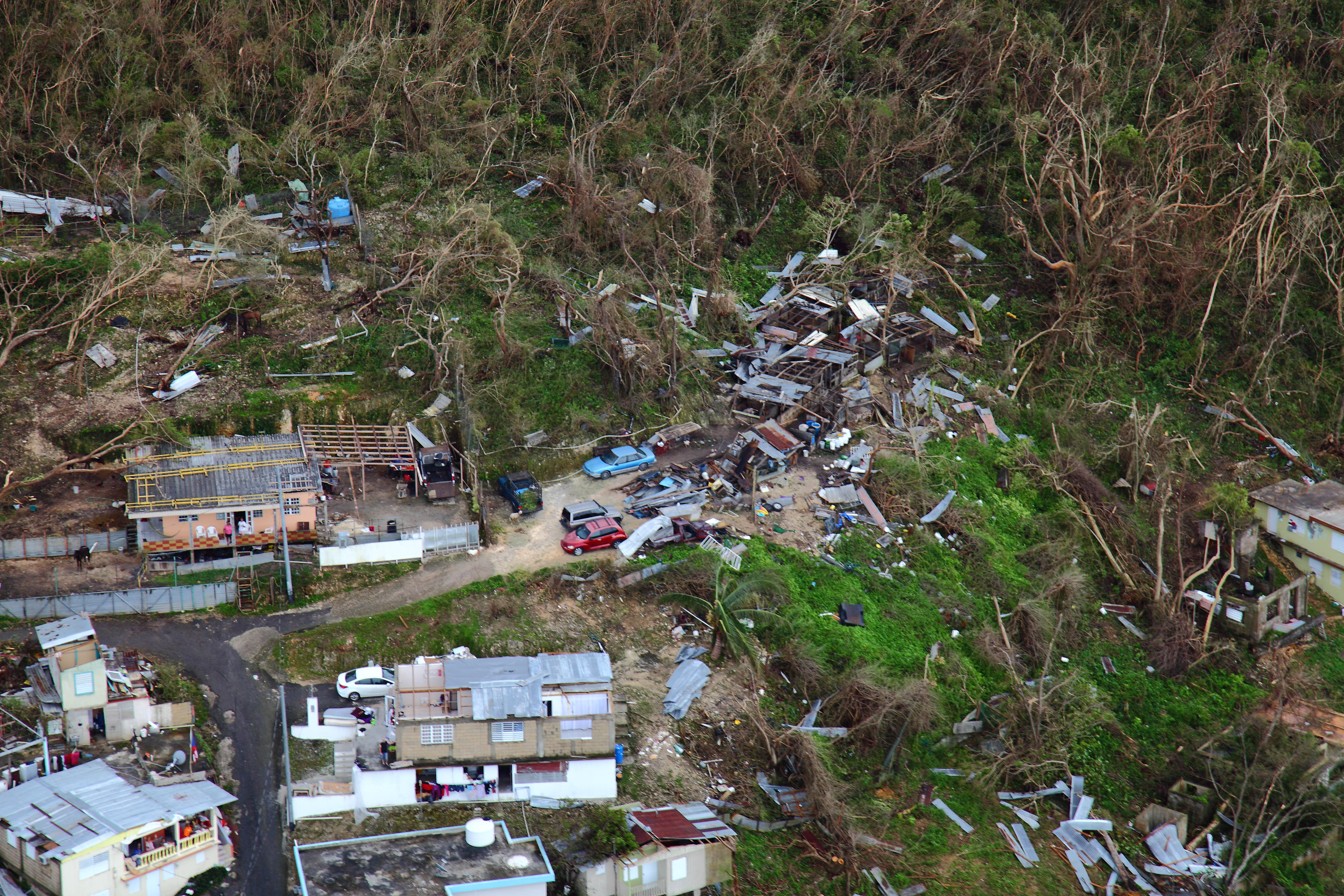
On September 20, 2017 Hurricane Maria struck. Thousands of homes suffered varying degrees of damage while large swaths of vegetation were shredded by the hurricane's violent winds.

Approximately 80 percent of the territory's agriculture was lost due to the hurricane, with agricultural losses estimated at $780 million. The hurricane completely destroyed the island's power grid, leaving all 3.4 million residents without electricity. Hurricane Maria caused a humanitarian crisis in Puerto Rico, with damages estimated in 90 billion dollars and a loss of human life close to three thousand.

== Weather by season ==
The Wet Season begins in April and lasts to November. The weather is hot and humid with thunderstorms in the afternoon, especially in August and September. Trade winds bring cool summer breezes in the north and east of Puerto Rico, but due to the topography of the island, these winds do not reach the coast south and west, causing much higher temperatures than in the north. During humid summer days, the heat index can reach 115 °F (47 °C) and actual temperatures can reach 100 °F (38 °C). Sometimes the wind shifts from the south, causing an inverse pattern, where the heat south of the island moves to the north, causing temperatures in the mid 90s (35 °C) in San Juan and low humidity. June is usually the driest month of the summer. During June and July the precipitation is mostly caused by the effects of humidity and heat of the island. The peak of the hurricane season comes in September. Weather conditions can be very rainy as tropical lows pass near the island, with frequent strong thunderstorms. By early November the tropical cyclone season fades and the weather becomes drier and generally sunny.

December brings the Dry Season which lasts through March. Weakening cool fronts from the north lower temperatures and humidity, and dry and sunny conditions prevail. In San Juan in the winter months, high temperatures reach 77–87 °F (25–30 °C) with an average high of 83 °F and lows down to 66–76 °F (19–24 °C), giving an average of 71 °F (22 °C). In the central area of the island the elevation and reduced sea effects bring the minimum temperatures to 55–65 °F (13–18 °C) on average. After fronts pass the temperature may drop to the 40s (4–9 °C) in the mountains, in the 50s (10–15 °C) in the valleys, and in the low 60s (16 °C to 20 °C) in the coastal zone. In general the climate in the dry season is sunny, with little change from day to day. February and March are often quite dry, sunny and hot.

== Sun ==
The sunrise varies from 5:30 a.m. in summer and 7:00 a.m. in winter. Sunset varies between 5:40 p.m. in winter and 7:10 p.m. in summer. Puerto Rico does not use daylight saving time. The ultraviolet index or UV index varies from 10+ in the summer and a maximum of 7 in winter.

== See also ==
- Climate change in Puerto Rico
- List of wettest known tropical cyclones in Puerto Rico
