= Climate change in Puerto Rico =

Climate change in the US territory of Puerto Rico

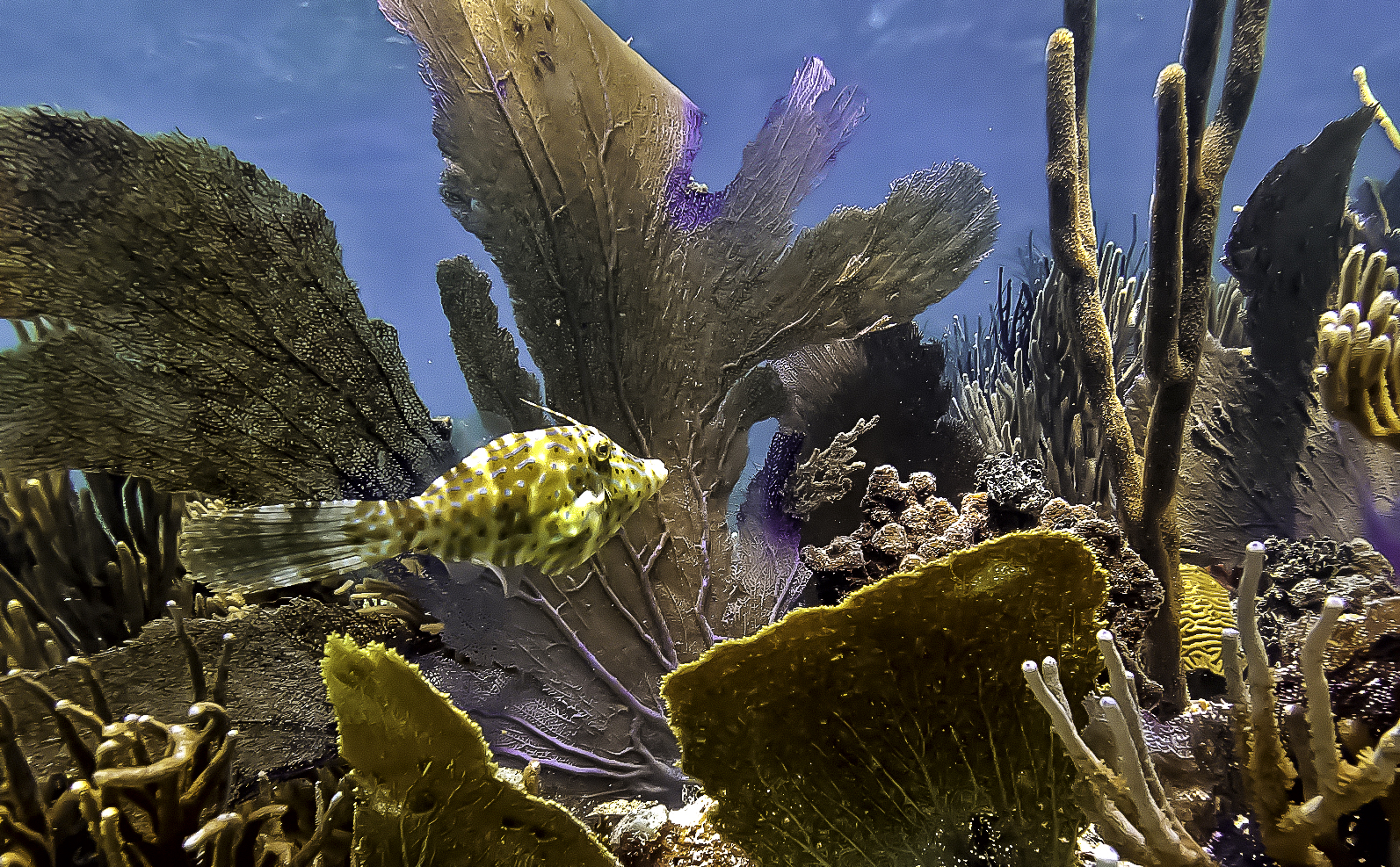
Coral reef in Culebra, Puerto Rico

Climate change has had large impacts on the ecosystems and landscapes of the US territory Puerto Rico. According to a 2019 report by Germanwatch, Puerto Rico is the most affected by climate change. The territory's energy consumption is mainly derived from imported fossil fuels.

The Puerto Rico Climate Change Council (PRCCC) noted severe changes in seven categories: air temperature, precipitation, extreme weather events, tropical storms and hurricanes, ocean acidification, sea surface temperatures, and sea level rise.

Climate change also affects Puerto Rico's population, the economy, human health, and the number of people forced to migrate.

Surveys have shown climate change is a matter of concern for most Puerto Ricans. The territory has enacted laws and policies concerning climate change mitigation and adaptation, including the use of renewable energy. Local initiatives are working toward mitigation and adaptation goals, and international aid programs support reconstruction after extreme weather events and encourage disaster planning.

== Greenhouse gas emissions ==
Puerto Rico is the 19th-biggest emitter of carbon dioxide among the 33 Latin American and Caribbean countries; its industrial emissions, energy supplies, and transportation are among the main sources of the island's net greenhouse gas emissions. The territory's gross carbon dioxide emissions rose to 80% between 1990 and 2005. Since 2005, emissions decreased by 42% until 2018, due to Puerto Ricans migrating to the United States. Between 2010 and 2020, the population declined 12% from 3.8 to 3.3 million inhabitants as a result of the country's vulnerability to natural disasters and its economic insecurities.

=== Energy consumption and fossil fuels ===
Puerto Rico's energy consumption is nearly 70 times higher than its energy production. Petroleum products supply 63% of Puerto Rico's electricity generating capacity; 23% comes from natural gas, 8% from coal, and 6% from renewable energy sources, specifically from solar, wind, hydropower, and biomass.

Puerto Rico has no reserves of fossil fuels; the territory's energy consumption comes mostly from imported fossil fuels.

The U.S. Department of Energy published the PR-100 Study in February 2024, which provided empirical evidence of how Puerto Rico could achieve its goal of 100% renewable energy (see Policies and legislation).

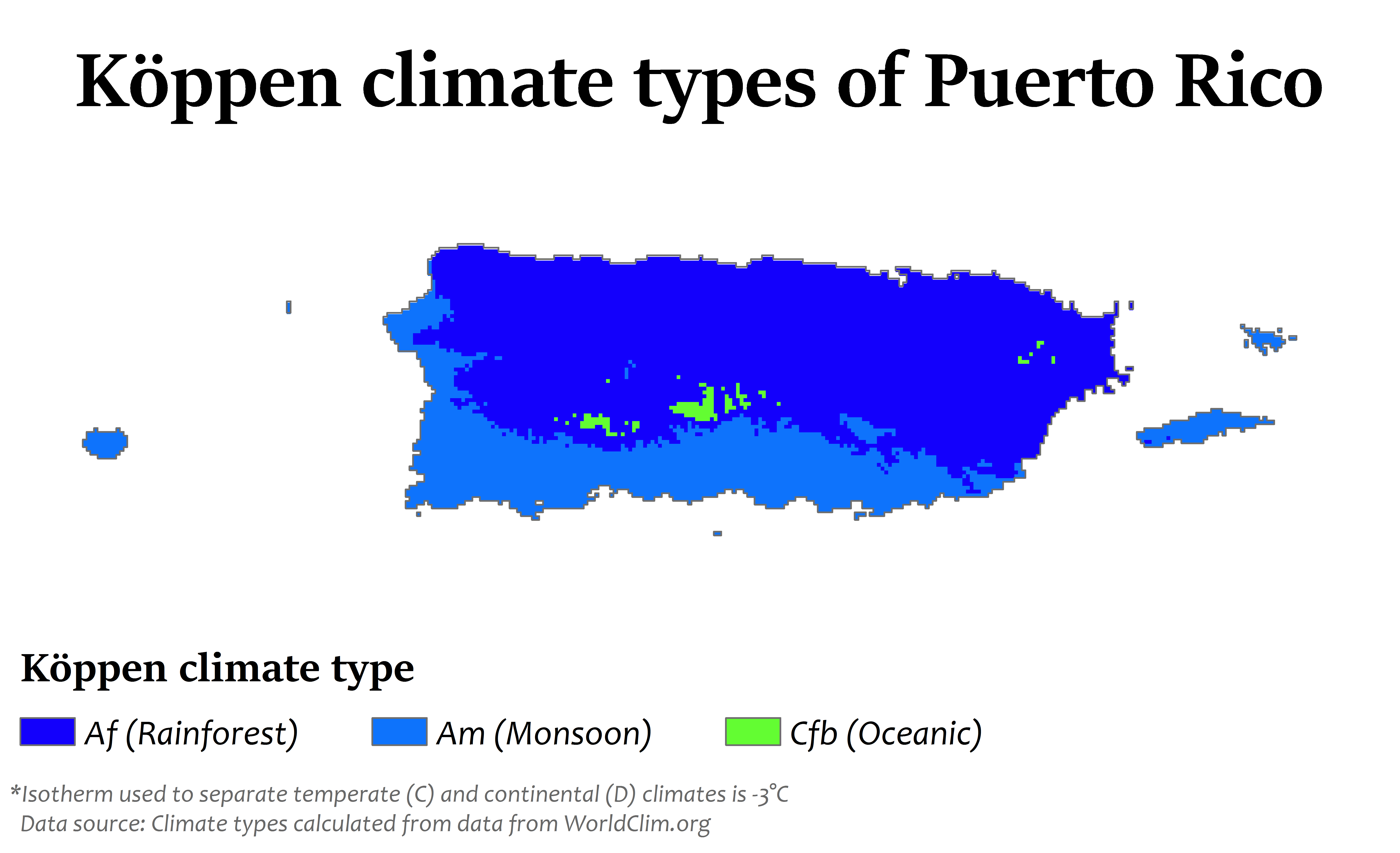
Köppen climate types of Puerto Rico

Per capita CO_{2} emissions of Puerto Rico in 2021 by fossil fuel compared to the U.S. (in metric tons) (Note: The data from the U.S. Energy Information Administration is only provided in millions of metric tons and the calculated per capita data is not exact. For estimation purposes, the data is indicated up to the second decimal place.)
	Puerto Rico	United States
Total Fossil Fuels	5.52	14.78
Petroleum	3.37	6.76
Natural Gas	1.23	4.99
Coal	0.92	3.02
Population of Puerto Rico (2021): 3,263,584; Population of the U.S. (2021): 331,893,745

== Impacts on the environment ==
The El Niño–Southern Oscillation and other periodic events, such as Volcanic eruptions, cause natural climate variability. These natural factors are summarized as "internal climate variability" and are always present in the climate system. The climate system is also affected by anthropogenic emissions of greenhouse gases and changes in atmospheric concentrations (e.g. carbon dioxide (CO_{2}), methane) and land surface changes. Climate change signals can be observed as changes in the magnitude of variability and systematic trends over time. Variability is a natural feature of the climate system and its understanding is fundamental for identifying signals of anthropogenic climate change.

=== Changes in climate parameters ===
Puerto Rico has a yearly tropical climate with moderately high temperatures and high humidity. According to a 2019 report by Germanwatch, Puerto Rico has been the territory most-affected by climate change, with a climate risk index score of 6.67. The Puerto Rico Climate Change Council (PRCCC) has identified changes in seven climate parameters: air temperature, precipitation, extreme weather events, tropical storms and hurricanes, ocean acidification, sea-surface temperatures, and sea level rise.

==== Air temperature ====
The mean annual temperature in Puerto Rico has increased from about 23 °C (73 °F) in 1921 to 25 °C (77 °F) in 2021. The central regions of Puerto Rico, which are at higher elevations, are warmer than any other regions of the island. Urban areas such as San Juan have become urban heat islands (UHIs), meaning they are warming more quickly than rural or vegetated regions. Studies in San Juan have shown the UHI effect is permanent due to urban expansion and it leads to a temperature increase of over 4C (7.2 F) compared to surrounding rural areas. This trend of greater urban warming is expected to continue with San Juan reaching an average temperature of 27 °C (81 °F) by 2050, an increase of 1.5 C (2.7 F).

==== Extreme weather events ====
The number of days with high temperatures is increasing while the number of days with very low temperatures is decreasing. During the early 20th century, there were approximately 100 days per decade that reached temperatures of over 32.2 °C (90.0 °F). In 2010, the same number of days above that temperature was reached within a year.

==== Rainfall ====
Puerto Rico receives large amounts of rainfall, especially in the north and central regions, which receive 3–4 m of rainfall every year. Within the territory, rainfall varies between regions due to topography and geography in relation to trade winds and oceanic circulation. Climate change is predicted to exacerbate these regional differences. For example, in some areas such as Old San Juan, there is a long-term trend towards a decrease in precipitation. This decline is expected to continue in future projections. The southern regions of Puerto Rico, which have been drier in the past, show a positive trend in precipitation. The seasonal distribution of precipitation is also expected to become more pronounced, with wetter winters and drier summers. Future projections indicate a further decrease in precipitation.

Heavy rainfall has increased by 20% on average in North America, the largest increase being in the wettest regions. Puerto Rico has seen a 37% increase in heavy precipitation. There is only limited data available for future projections, which leads to conflicting forecasts for extreme precipitation in the territory. General projections for the Caribbean region suggest a higher incidence of extreme precipitation events despite a decrease in total rainfall. Rainfall will be less frequent but more intense.

==== Water resources ====
Potential impacts on water resources in rain-fed areas of the Caribbean include higher precipitation extremes, greater seasonal variability in water runoff, a higher likelihood of prolonged dry spells, and an increased risk of droughts and floods. In this context, prolonged dry periods and increased evaporation can lead to a decline in lake levels. This is a problem because they are an essential source of freshwater. Groundwater use is expected to increase with demand for water, especially in dry months when surface sources decline. Prolonged dry periods could also lead to reduced soil moisture, resulting in an increased need for irrigation in agriculture.

==== Sea surface temperature ====
Since 1920, the surface temperatures of the Caribbean Sea have warmed by 1.5 °C (2.7 °F). The warming of the sea surface on Caribbean coasts of Puerto Rico is faster than that on Atlantic coasts. In addition, temperatures below the water surface are rising more quickly than surface temperatures. In 2018, researchers estimated there will be an increase of more than 1 °C (1.8 °F) within 50 years. This would mean temperatures would exceed the threshold for coral bleaching for about one-third of the year and the threshold for the formation of deep convection storms will be exceeded throughout the year.

==== Sea level rise ====
The rate of sea level rise (SLR) in Puerto Rico has been measured at 1.7 mm a year based on historical records from tidal gauges since 1900, which is consistent with global trends. However, recent satellite data from 1992 onwards shows that this rate has almost doubled to 3.2 mm a year. Projections for the future SLR in Puerto Rico are similar to global estimates, with the National Oceanographic and Atmospheric Administration (NOAA) recommending updated bounds of 0.3 m to 2.5 m for end-of-century projections. The Caribbean region, including Puerto Rico, is particularly vulnerable to coastal flooding due to SLR.

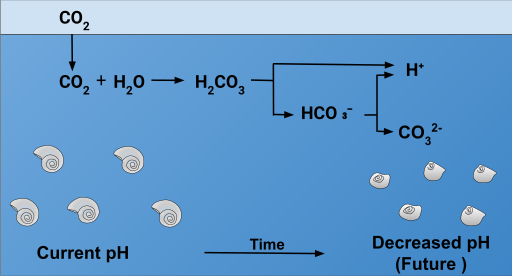
Effect of Ocean Acidification on Calcification

==== Ocean acidification ====
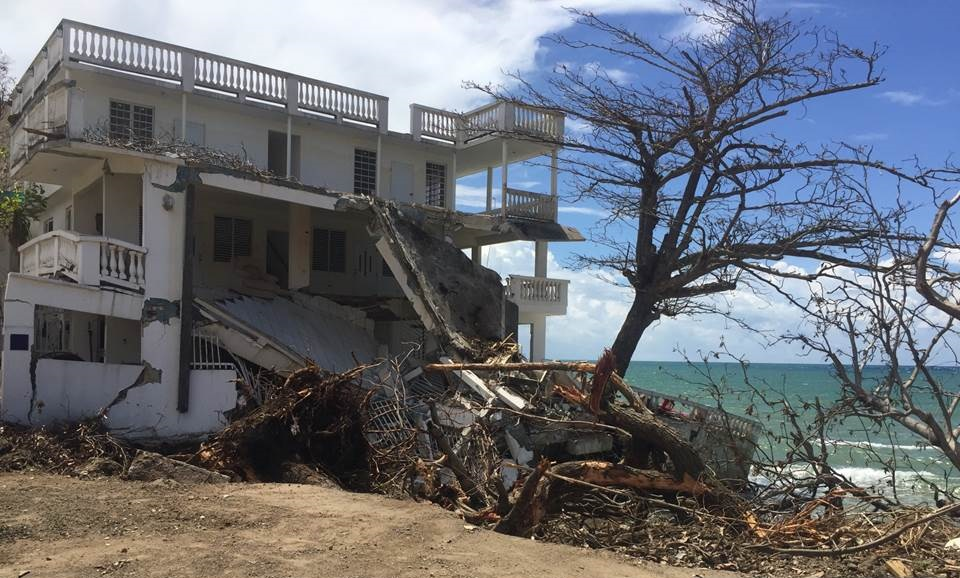
Damage after Hurricane Maria in 2017

As more carbon dioxide (CO_{2}) is released into the atmosphere, oceans absorbs more CO_{2}, leading to a decrease in pH and carbonate saturation of the ocean. This process, which is known as ocean acidification, negatively impacts marine life and geological processes by reducing calcification rates and mineral precipitation. Puerto Rico experiences similar trends to the rest of the world, with decreasing average pH and carbonate saturation state. As of 2023, the rate of decline for aragonite saturation states in Puerto Rico is 3% per decade and is expected to continue with ongoing emissions.

==== Tropical storms and hurricanes ====
Geographic location of Puerto Rico

In Puerto Rico, hurricanes Irma and Maria in 2017 are an example of predicted climate change impacts on tropical cyclones that had devastating effects in the Caribbean, including damage to the coral reefs that dissipate wave energy on Puerto Rico's coasts. The lack of protection from the reefs leads to an increased risk of damage by winter swells, resulting in coastal erosion and sediment displacement. The southern part of the island is particularly vulnerable to Atlantic hurricanes. In the future, rising sea-surface temperatures are likely to lead to more intense rainfall, winds, and storm surges.

=== Ecosystems ===
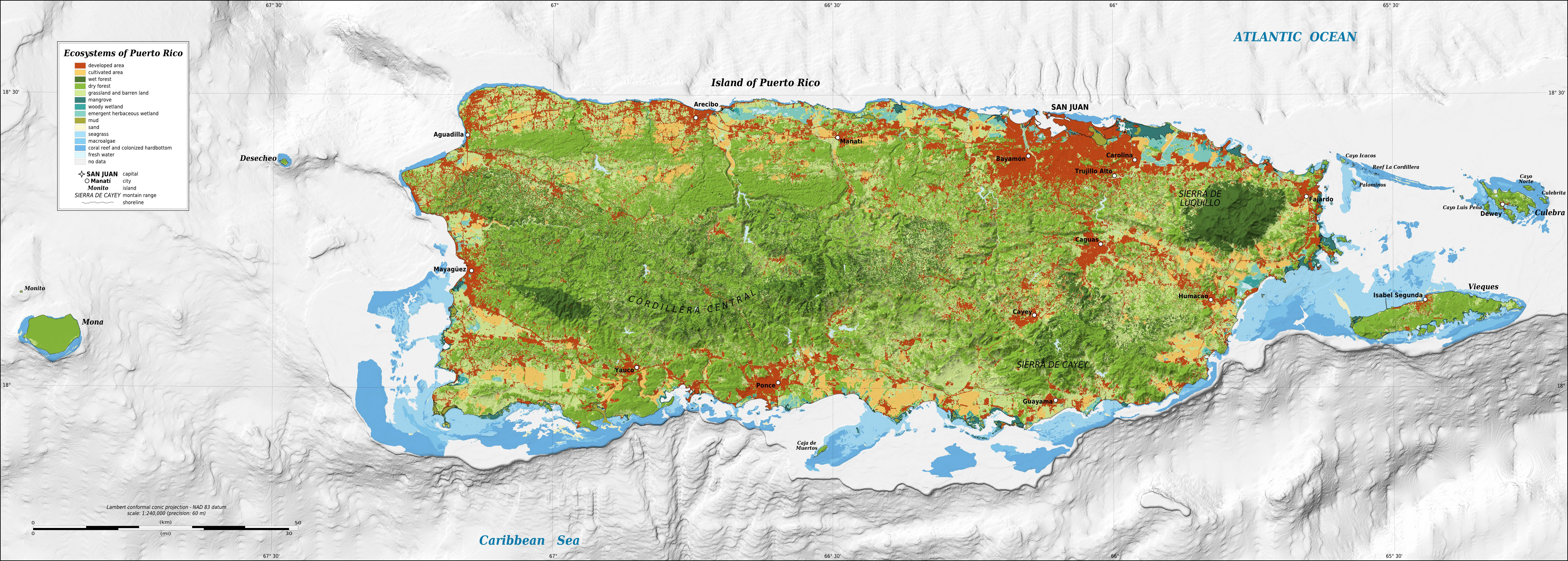
Ecosystems in Puerto Rico

Despite the relatively small size of territory there are several ecosystems in Puerto Rico; coastal and marine ecosystems, dry forests and rainforests, the Puerto Rican karst, and mountainous areas. Climate change is expected to have synergistic effects on ecosystems and species in Puerto Rico, meaning systems that are already under stress will be exposed to additional stressors, exceeding their adaptive capacity. This may result in loss of habitat, adverse changes in structure and function, and reduced benefits to society. While certain ecosystems and species may be able to adapt to the changing environment, others may have difficulty coping with new conditions.

==== Dry forests and rainforest ====
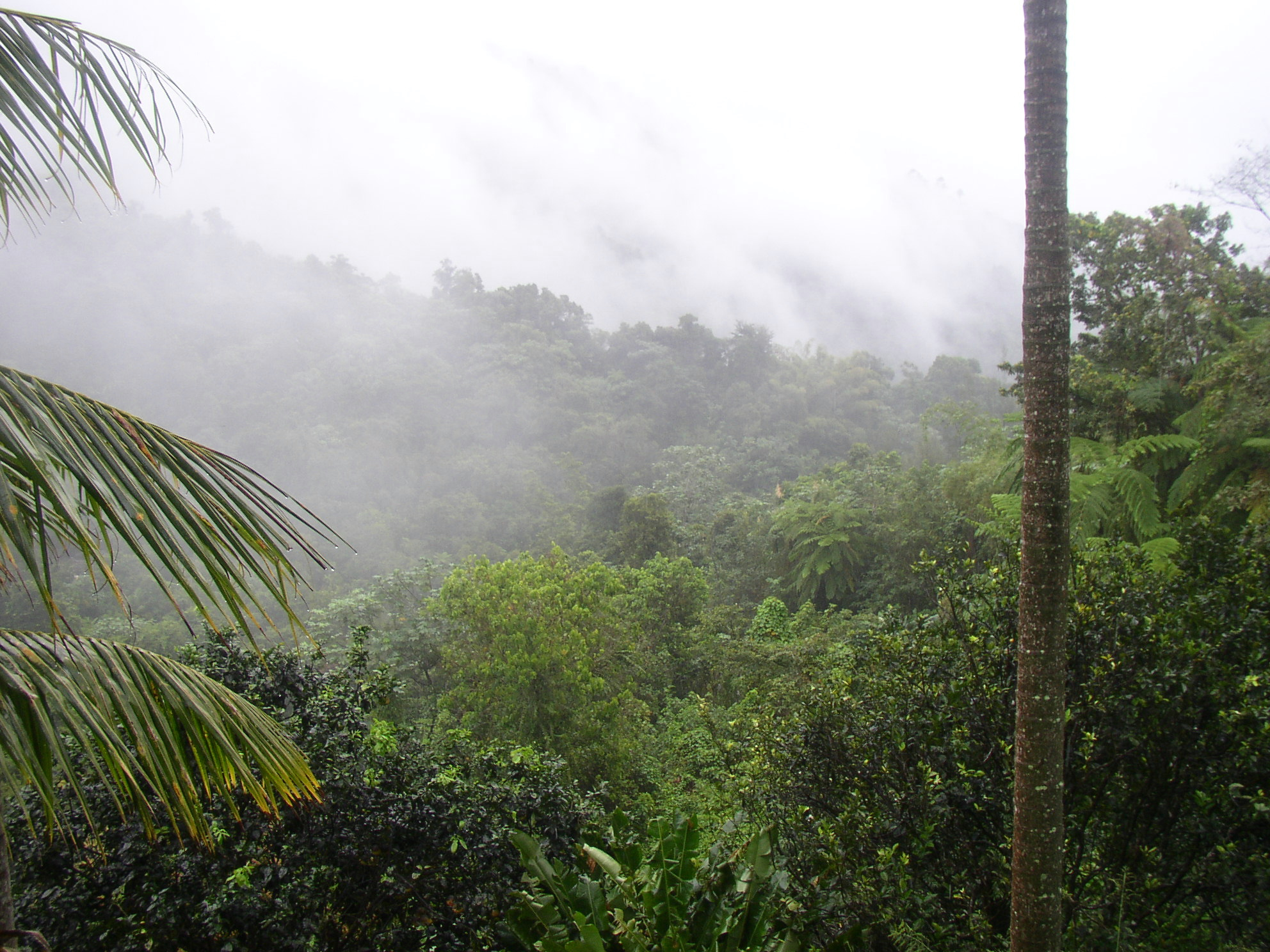
El Yunque Rainforest

As of 2023, about 40% of Puerto Rico's land area is covered by forests, mainly young mixed forests, that provide important habitat for numerous plant and animal species. They are also an important source of water for municipalities, agriculture, and industry, which is vital for nearly four million people. Forests also provide recreational areas. Using the changes in Puerto Rico's forests, models for understanding similar changes in other tropical islands as a result of human expansion can be derived. With the introduction of economically important crops and deforestation for pasture and charcoal production, Puerto Rico's forests have dramatically changed over the past two centuries. Economic development and increasing urbanization are the main factors in the disappearance of forests and old agricultural lands. The diversity of Puerto Rican forests in terms of location and type is so great the number of forest types has yet to be fully documented.

Climate change is having a strong effect on forests through higher air temperatures, changes in precipitation, more intense wind and water events, and sea-level rise. All of these factors are altering species composition and forest structure due to changes in habitat.

==== Karst landscapes ====
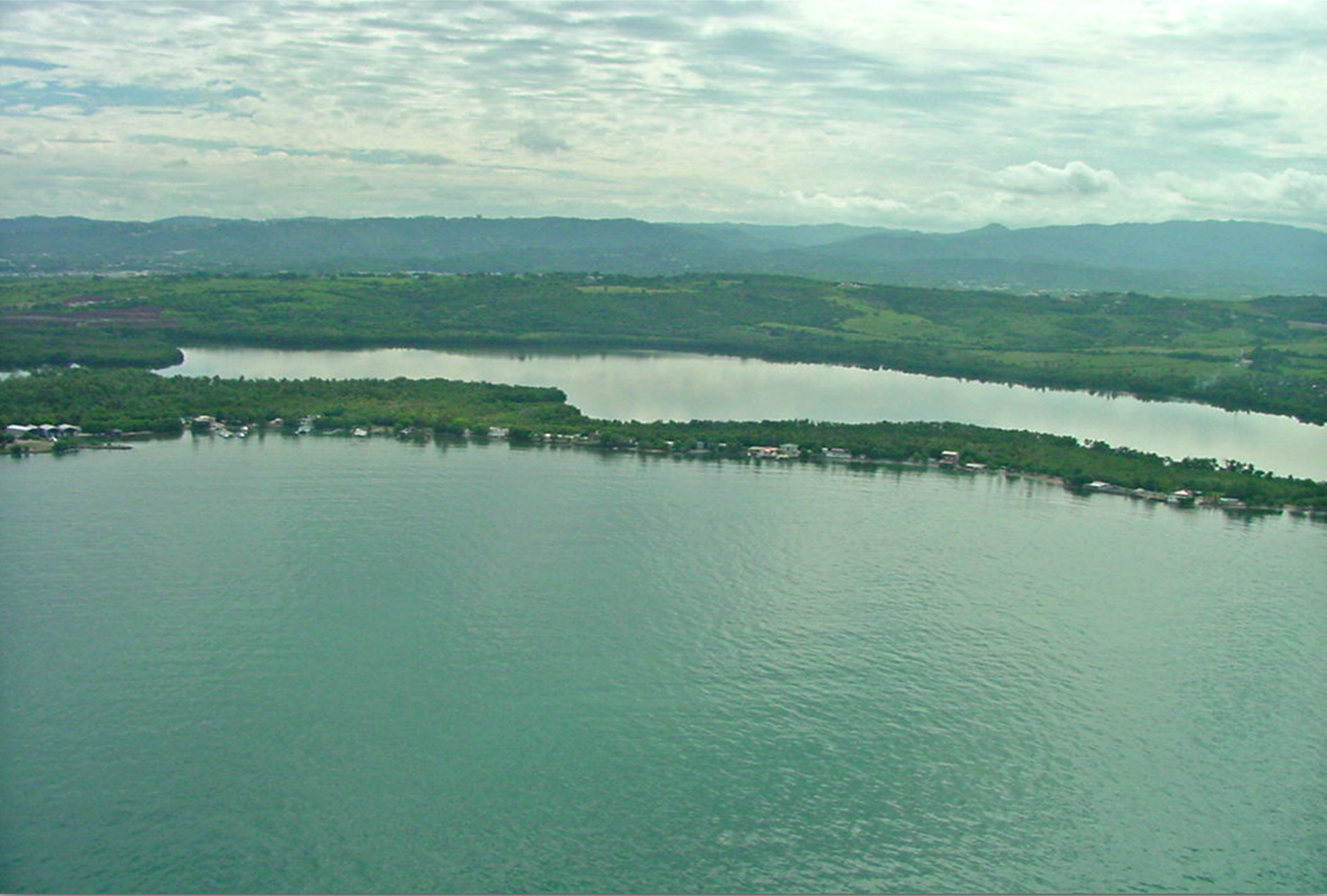
Laguna Joyuda

The Puerto Rican karst topography is formed by the dissolution of soluble rocks beneath the surface or with the help of groundwater. Karst topography is often linked with carbonate rocks, including limestone and dolomite. In Puerto Rico, limestone terrain covers around 244,000 ha (600,000 acres) or 28% of the island's area, with 219,000 ha (540,000 acres) in the north, 21,000 ha (52,000 acres) in the south, and 4,600 ha (11,000 acres) scattered throughout the remaining parts of the island. Karst landscapes are very vulnerable to climate change and human pressures such as tourism and agriculture. Human-environment interactions can have a critical effect on the components of karst landscapes such as caves and their biodiversity.

Puerto Rico's karst areas have been regarded as one of the world's most-endangered karst areas. It is the least-fragmented habitat in Puerto Rico. In the early 21st century, there are efforts to promote ecotourism in the region to combine the economic benefits of tourism with environmental protection.

==== Wetlands ====
Puerto Rico has a variety of freshwater and marine wetland ecosystems, including coastal seagrass and mangrove ecosystems, freshwater wetlands, and high-elevation cloud forests. These wetlands are highly productive and have a variety of rare plant and animal species. For downstream settlements and communities, they play an important role in water supply. Water runoff from the mountains to the coast contributes to the formation of vital ecosystems in rivers, coastal waters, and estuaries that serve as breeding and nursery habitats for fish, crustaceans, and other organisms.

In Puerto Rico and in the wider Caribbean, palustrine and estuarine ecosystems are very vulnerable to the impacts of climate change due to the relationship between hydrology, and wetland structure and function. Most wetlands in Puerto Rico are located along the coast, with palustrine wetlands largely adjacent to estuaries or nearshore ecosystems, leading to interactions between the systems.

During Puerto Rico's agricultural expansion, wetland ecosystems were severely impacted and destroyed by dredging, filling, draining, eutrophication, and the use of fertilizers and pesticides in agriculture. The size of the original area of freshwater wetlands in Puerto Rico during the lifetime of Christopher Columbus is unknown.

==== Shorelines ====
The two main types of coasts in Puerto Rico are beaches (30%) and vegetated coasts, which are mainly covered by mangroves (28%), although other plants occur in dune areas. Rocky coasts are composed of different types of rocks and represent 10% of the island's coasts. The transition from agriculture to industry during the 20th century, including the construction of port facilities and breakwaters, greatly altered the coastline. Urbanization also contributes to the hardening of the coastline, affecting sediment transportation and erosion. The spread of paved shorelines poses a significant threat by reducing natural coastal protection and promoting erosion. These effects are likely to be exacerbated by climate change, for example, with the increasing intensity and frequency of storms and sea-level rise.

==== Marine systems ====
Puerto Rico's marine ecosystems consist of coral and seagrass habitats, bays, and small islands that support a range of valuable resources including fisheries and marine mammals.

===== Bioluminescent systems =====
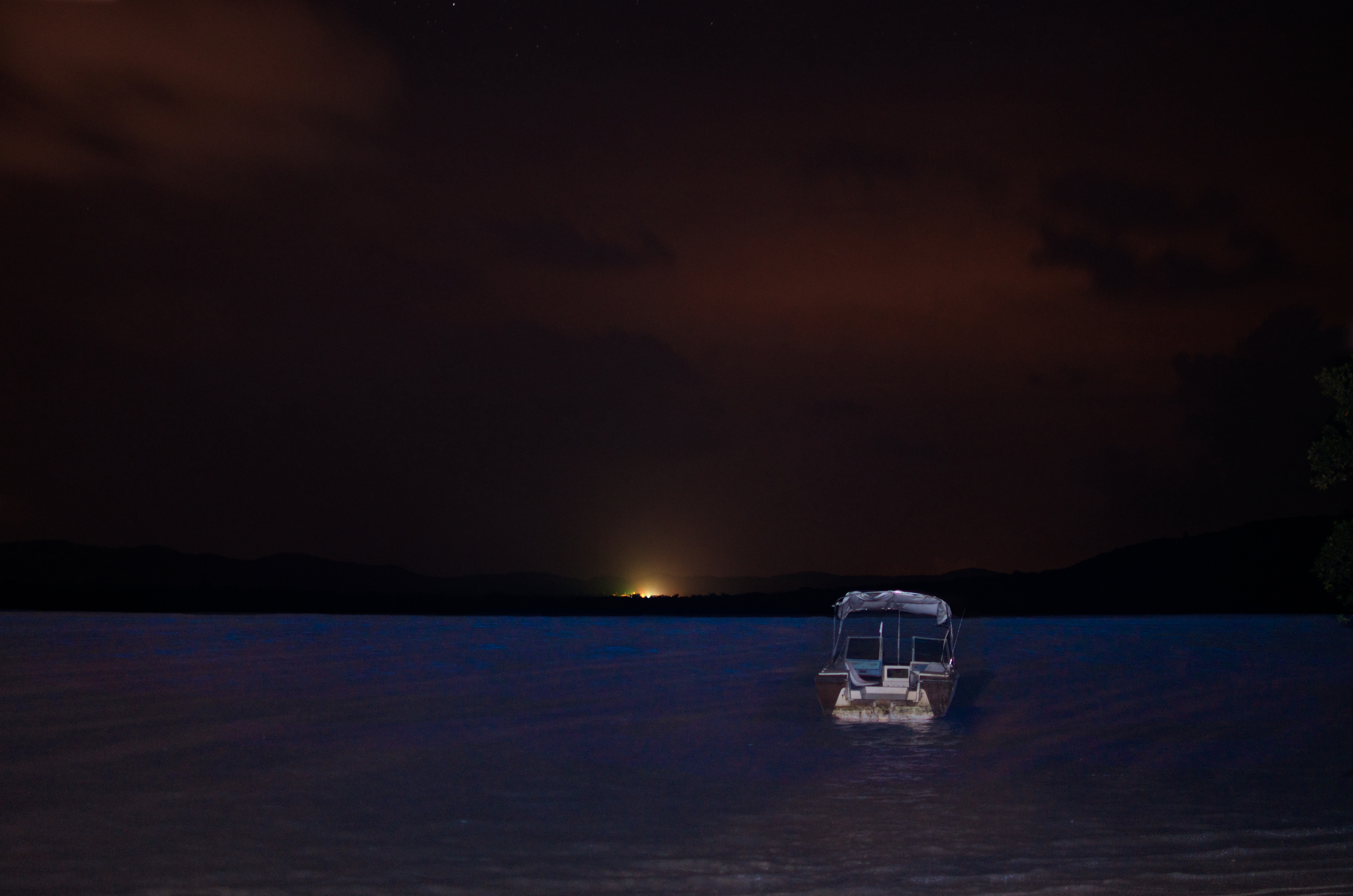
Mosquito bay - Bioluminescent bay in Vieques

Climate change is stressing bioluminescent algae, particularly through heavy precipitation, storms, and hurricanes. These factors can lead to an increase in land runoff, which can increase levels of sediment and nutrients in the water. Water quality can change due to changes in sedimentation, productivity, and the frequency and magnitude of salinity changes. In addition, warmer temperatures due to climate change affect phytoplankton.

===== Seagrass habitats =====
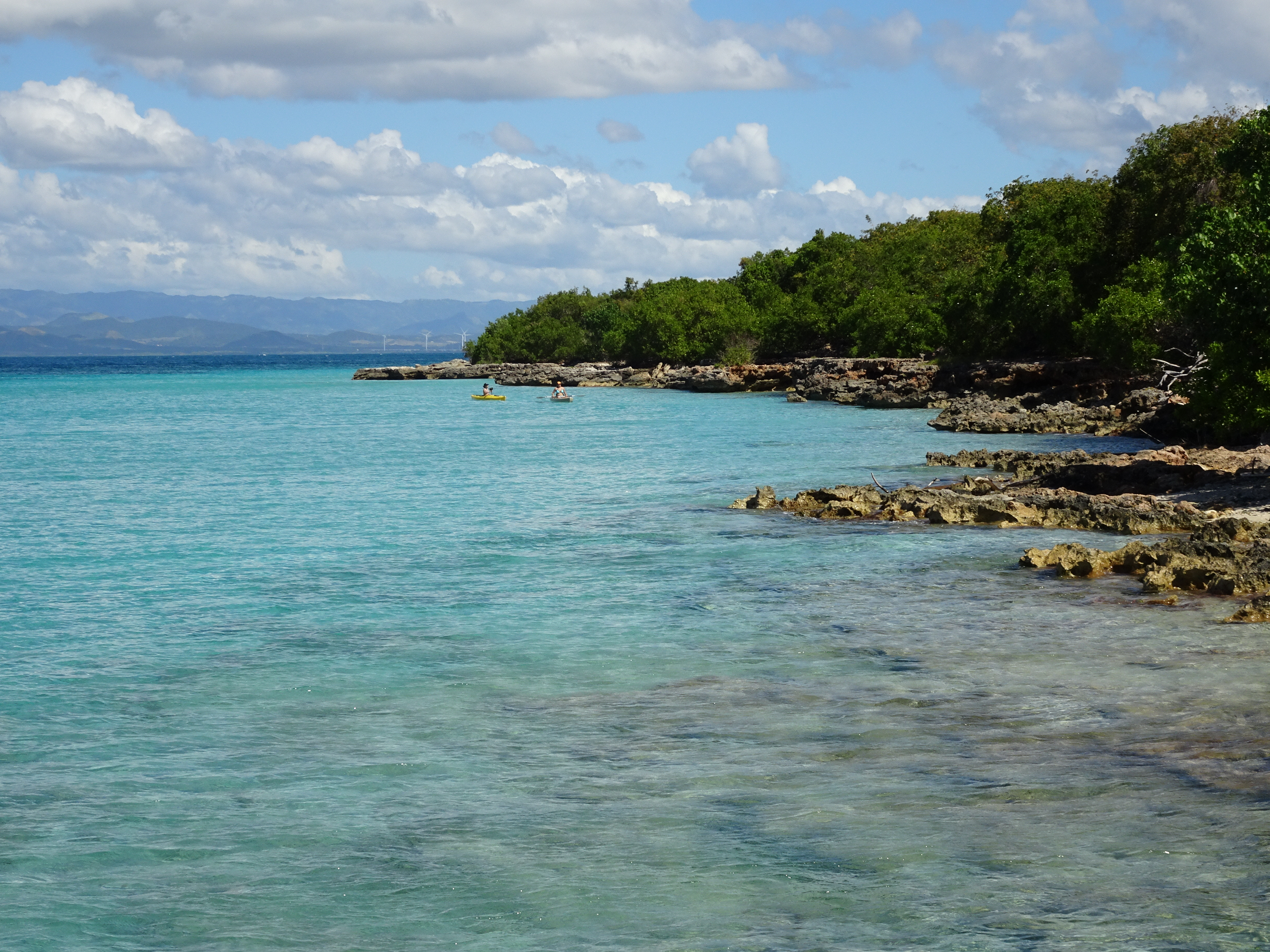
Playa Guardia Costanera, Caja de Muertos Island

One effect of climate change is on seagrass cover, which has been researched at Caja de Muertos Island, where there is dense seagrass cover. More intense and frequent storms due to climate change are predicted to damage this habitat; seagrass cover declined after Hurricane Maria in 2017. The seagrass beds have the ability to recover from these storms and some climate change effects such as increased nutrient supply after rainfall events, and higher CO_{2} concentrations can benefit the habitat. The more-frequent and more-intense storms are predicted to outweigh these positive effects and lead to long-term damage to seagrass cover.

===== Coral habitats =====
Climate change causes stress on coral habitats through factors such as rising sea temperatures, sudden reductions of salinity, increased chemical toxins, and solar irradiance. A common phenomenon is coral bleaching, which occurs because a change in the habitat's conditions unbalances the symbiosis between corals and populations of photosynthetic dinoflagellate (zooxanthellae). Through stressors caused by climate change, the zooxanthellae lose their photosynthetic pigments or are expelled from the coral tissues. As a result, the corals are deprived of their energy source, which leads to starvation and death.

The Puerto Rico Coral Reef Monitoring Program (PRCRMP) is monitoring 42 coral-reef stations around the territory to document the status of the habitats. Mass coral bleaching events were reported after temperature extremes of El Niño events in 1987, 1998, and 2005. These mass bleaching events cause significant declines in biodiversity and the abundance of coral reef fish.

== Impacts on people ==
=== Economic impacts ===
Various social, economic, and political factors increase Puerto Rico's susceptibility to climate change. The island is classified as a small island developing state (SIDS), an official classification by the United Nations. This designation recognizes the challenges faced by SIDS as a result of small size, limited resources, and relative geographic isolation. Other reasons have also been cited as causes for Puerto Rico's heightened vulnerability to climate change, such as culture, access to resources, access to information, and governance history.

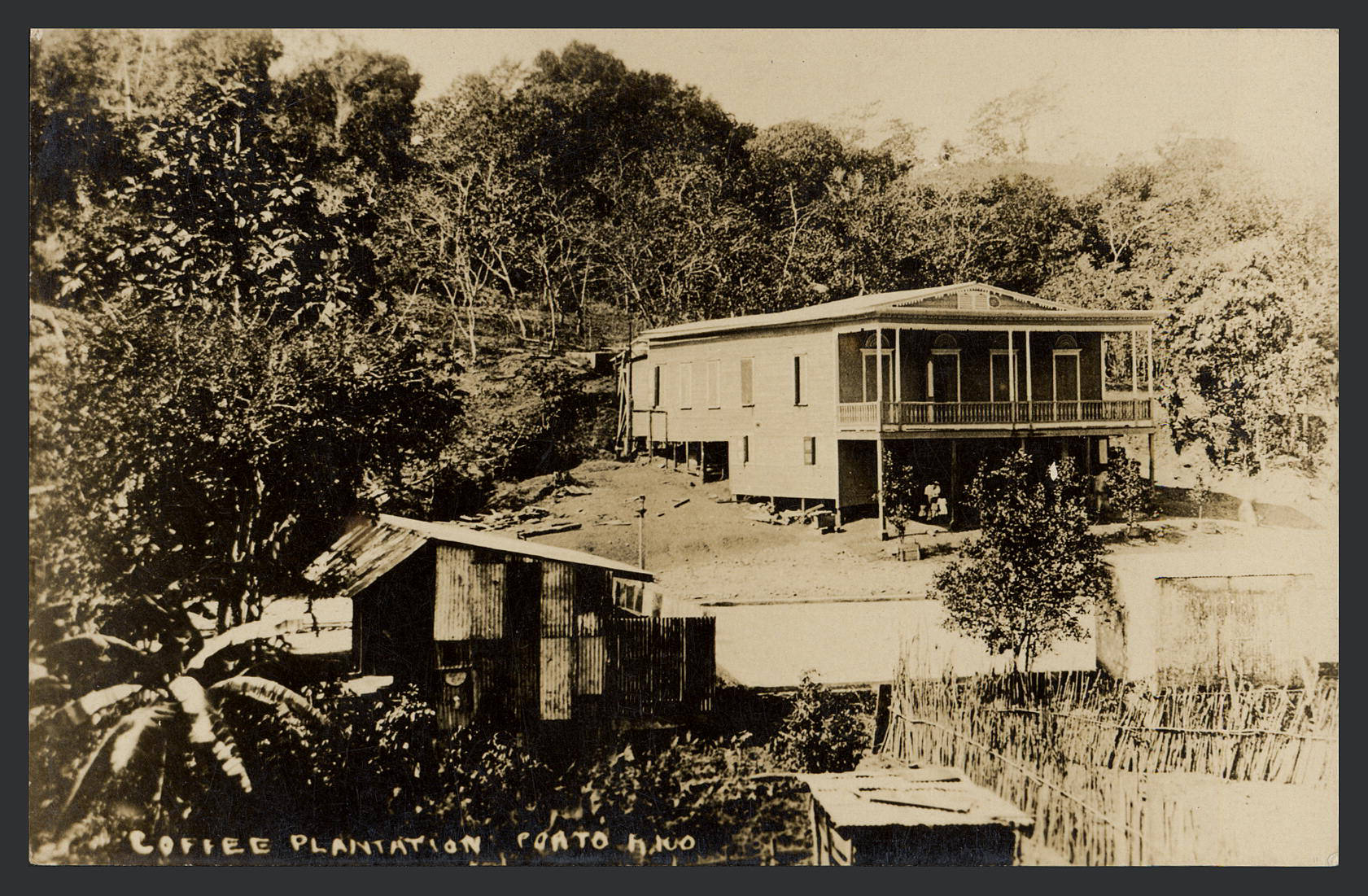
Coffee plantation in Puerto Rico

==== Agricultural impacts ====
Climate change poses significant threats to agriculture in Puerto Rico. Droughts, floods, and saltwater intrusion affect agricultural land. Coastal agricultural lands are particularly vulnerable to sea level rise, which can exacerbate water access issues and affect prime agricultural land. New pests and invasive species can also affect livestock, wildlife, and plants. Many farmers in Puerto Rico lack the necessary capacity, expertise, information, and equipment to adapt to climate change.

Rising temperatures may have a detrimental effect on agricultural productivity in Puerto Rico, particularly livestock farming because high temperatures can harm cows, causing them to eat less, grow more slowly, and produce less milk. Additionally, reduced water availability during the dry season may stress crops while higher temperatures could lead to reduced yields of certain crops, including plantain, banana, and coffee.

Additionally, farinaceous crops, including cassava and yams, have been affected by droughts, leading to reduced yields and quality. Fruits such as mangoes and avocados have been affected by changes in rainfall patterns, which can affect their flowering and fruiting. Farmers have also had to deal with increased costs associated with importing feed to compensate for the reduced availability of hay due to droughts.

===== Coffee production impacts =====
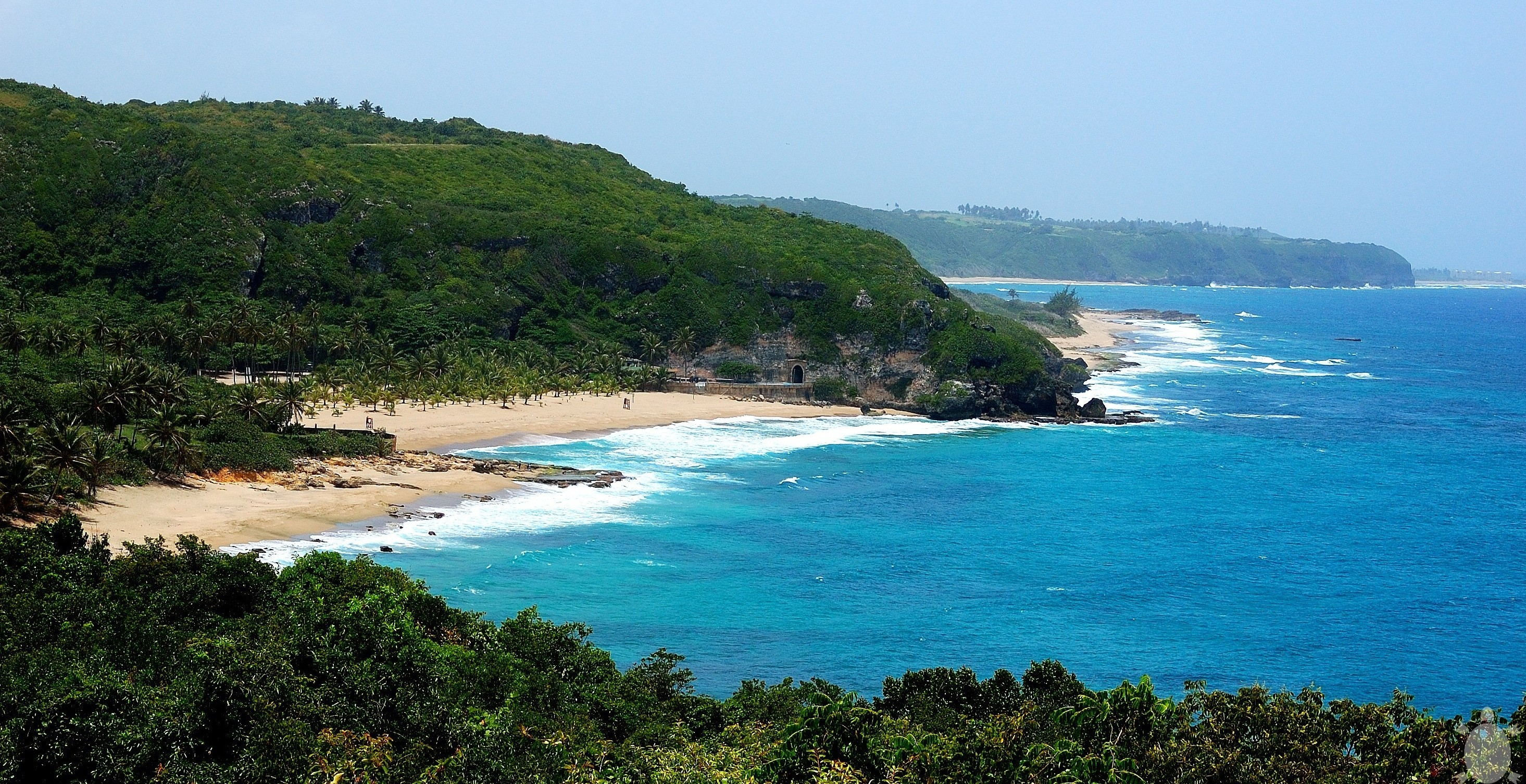
North Coast of Puerto Rico

A recent study used a modeling approach to assess the effects of climate change on coffee production in Puerto Rico. The study found under future climate scenarios, the area suitable for coffee production in the territory is expected to significantly decrease, which could result in lower yields and poorer quality coffee. By 2050, the area suitable for coffee production could halve and by 2100 it could be completely gone.

According to the study, warming and drying trends are projected to accelerate after 2040; this may lead to the loss of up to 84% of highly suitable growing conditions in top-producing municipalities by 2070. Under one scenario, Puerto Rico may retain only 24 km^{2} of highly suitable conditions by 2071–2099. Such projected loss of suitable growing conditions could have negative economic effects on the coffee industry, which has long been culturally and economically significant. Although value-added markets present opportunities to revive the industry, regional climate change trends may threaten the production of high-quality coffee.

==== Tourism industry impacts ====
Climate change in Puerto Rico hinders the territory's gross national income (GMI) growth and threatens the tourism industry, which is an important economic driver. The island's natural features, such as coral reefs, beaches, mangroves, and rainforests are particularly vulnerable to climate change. Visitors to these ecosystems spend more than $1.9 billion annually in Puerto Rico. Climate-related risks such as water scarcity, coastal erosion, loss of marine biodiversity, warmer summers, extreme weather events, and an increase in disease outbreaks can substantially affect tourism and the wider economy.

=== Health impacts ===
Since 1950, the frequency of nights where temperatures reach 28 °C (82 °F) or above in Puerto Rico has increased by about 50 percent, and the overnight low in San Juan is above 28 °C (82 °F) about 10 percent of the time. Puerto Rico's climate is suitable for mosquito species that carry diseases like malaria, yellow fever, and dengue fever, which are likely to increase with higher air temperatures that accelerate the mosquito life-cycle and virus replication.

==== Impact on diseases ====
Puerto Rico's warm marine environment supports the occurrence of some water-related illnesses, such as vibriosis and ciguatera poisoning, which can increase with higher ocean temperatures that promote the growth of these bacteria and algae. Changes in temperature and rainfall patterns can also increase the risk of infectious and vector-borne diseases like dengue fever, chikungunya, and Zika virus, which are transmitted by mosquitoes that are sensitive to environmental changes.

==== Impact on public health infrastructure ====
Extreme weather events like hurricanes and floods can have direct effects on human health, causing injuries, displacement, and stress; damaging healthcare infrastructure; and disrupting access to healthcare services, which can worsen existing health disparities. The resilience of healthcare facilities can be increased by installing backup generators, improving building codes, developing emergency response plans, and reducing carbon footprints by implementing energy-efficient practices and using renewable energy sources.

==== Impact on respiratory illnesses ====
Climate change can indirectly affect human health by worsening air and water quality. For example, increases in temperature can worsen air pollution and respiratory illnesses while changes in rainfall patterns can contaminate water sources. Promoting alternative transportation methods such as bicycling and walking can help reduce emissions from vehicles and improve air quality, reducing the risk of respiratory illnesses.

=== Housing impacts ===
Tropical storms and hurricanes have become more intense in Puerto Rico since 2003. Although scientists are not certain this intensification reflects a long-term trend, hurricane wind speeds and rainfall rates are expected to increase as the climate continues to warm. This poses a significant threat to Puerto Rico's housing infrastructure, as cities, roads, and ports that are vulnerable to damage from wind and water. Higher wind speeds can make insurance for wind damage more expensive or difficult to obtain, and coastal homes and infrastructure are likely to flood more often as sea levels rise. Inland flooding is likely to increase as heavy rainstorms become more frequent and intense, resulting in significant property damage and displacement of affected communities.

=== Migration impacts ===
The effects of climate change in Puerto Rico are expected to have significant implications for migration. As extreme weather events become more frequent and intense, they are likely to displace populations and create new waves of climate refugees. Coastal communities are at particular risk of displacement due to sea-level rise and increased storm surges. The impact of climate change on agriculture and food security could also lead to displacement as people are forced to migrate to find better opportunities.

== Society and culture ==
Puerto Rico has a long and culturally rich history, spanning more than 5,000 years. Climate change is considered a major threat that severely affects the physical evidence of this history. This is due to rising air temperatures, which are associated with an increased rate of degradation of artifacts and decay of organic material. Another reason is the change in precipitation trends, which may make some regions drier or wetter and thus change the conditions for the materials by, for example, making them more prone to fire.

In order to preserve Puerto Rico's cultural heritage, its vulnerability must be assessed so that management plans can be created that include strategies to increase resilience and adaptability. Early identification of sites at risk is crucial for the creation of historical records and collections. A useful tool for the protection of cultural heritage sites is community participation, that is the use of citizen science to monitor areas and provide feedback on their significance.

== Mitigation and adaptation ==
As a developing territory, Puerto Rico has a relatively small carbon footprint, leading to a small global impact on mitigation efforts such as reducing greenhouse gas emissions or increasing carbon sequestration.

Puerto Rico recognizes the shared responsibility to reduce emissions and develops mitigation plans and regulations on national and multinational levels. The publication of the first Puerto Rico State of the Climate report in 2013 spurred engagement in climate-change adaptation and mitigation strategies on environmental, social, and economic issues.

=== Mitigation and adaptation approaches ===
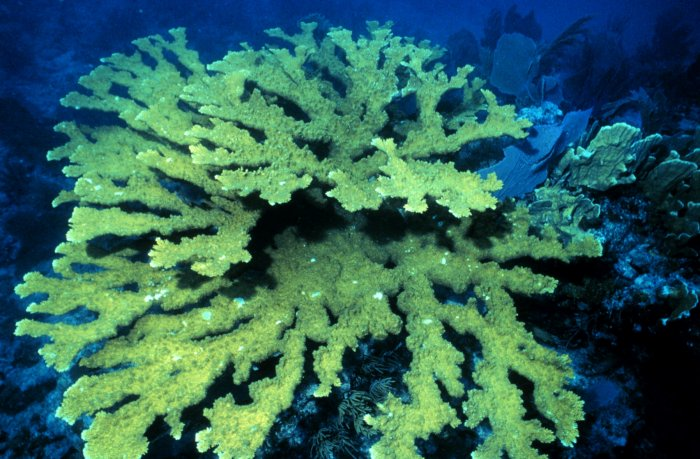
Elkhorn coral

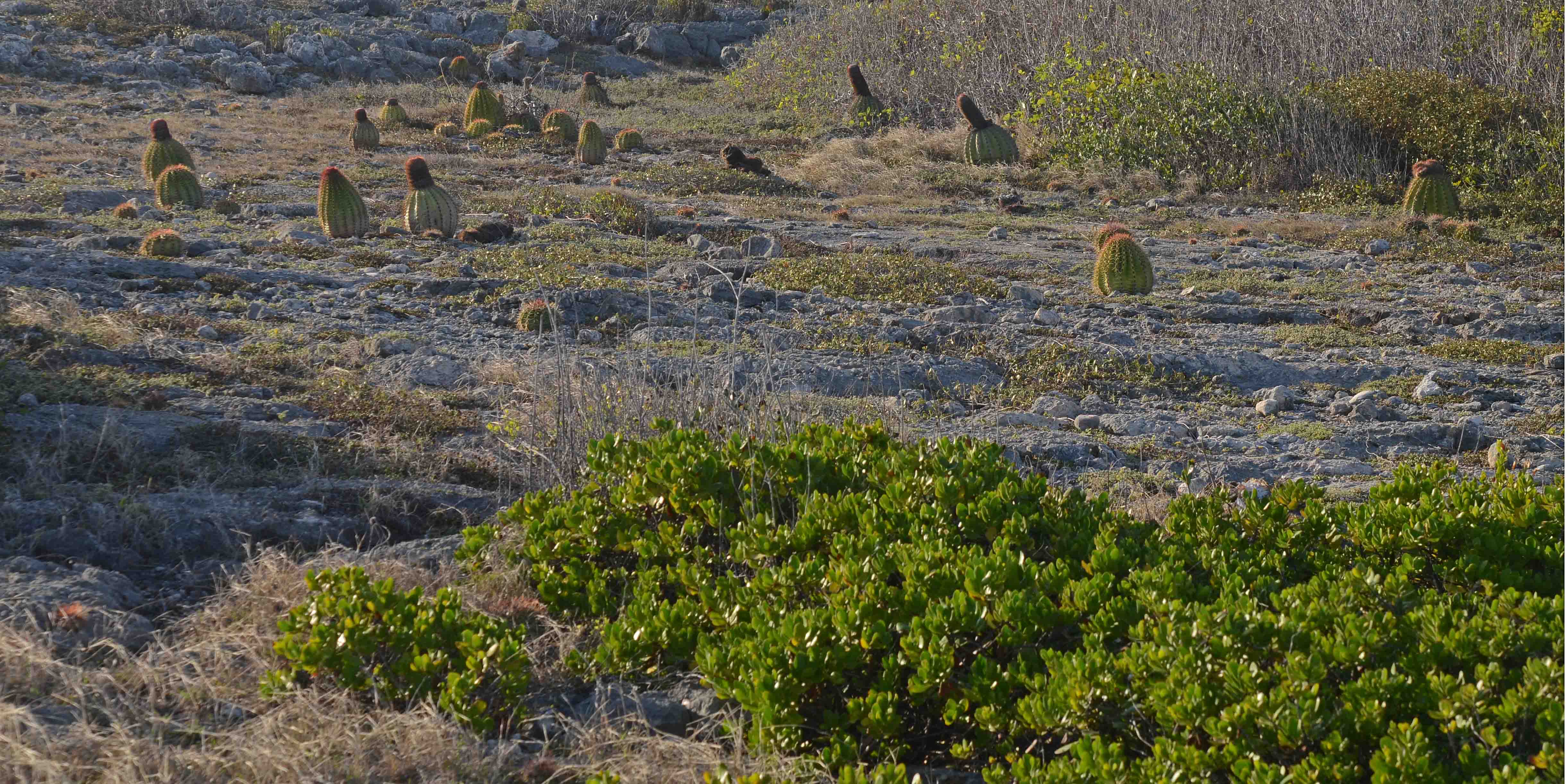
Guánica State Forest, Puerto Rico

- The NGO Vida Marina in Puerto Rico found dune restoration can be supported by using biomimicry. Dune formation is accelerated by putting small pieces of wood into the sand; these imitate the sand-collecting property of coastal vegetation.
- Coral-population-enhancement techniques and restocking measures, are being applied to stabilize populations that have been disturbed by storms. The plantation of elkhorn corals can buffer wave energy and help to build up ramparts that play an important role in mitigating sea-level rise threatening Puerto Rico because they have a stabilizing function for cays.
- Sea-level changes and coastal erosion, and the presence of invasive species especially in the southern karst might be limited by expanding protected areas such as Guánica Commonwealth Forest.
- The expansion of existing marine protected areas, creation of new ones, and the creation of education programs improving the management of human activities are expected to diminish coral diseases, and favor other marine species and habitats. Coral survival could also be supported by fostering species with high genetic variability. These efforts could be augmented by restricting land-based sources of pollution.
- Vulnerability assessments that account for climate-change-induced habitat changes can help to determine areas that would be suitable for the relocation of especially vulnerable species.
- The improvement of water quality by decreasing the content of nutrients through improvement of drain traps for storm water or the installation of control systems for erosion can significantly contribute to the protection of coastal and marine habitats.

=== Policies and legislation ===
Article VI, § 19 of the Constitution of Puerto Rico includes the duty of public policy to use and manage natural resources as effectively as possible and thus contribute to Puerto Rican welfare. The validity of this mandate persists across any law or regulation. It has not been specifically interpreted with respect to climate change but initiatives and policies aimed at sustainable development, including the mitigation of climate change and adaptation to its consequences, are thriving.

==== Act No. 82-2010, as amended “Public Policy on Energy Diversification by Means of Sustainable and Alternative Renewable Energy in Puerto Rico Act” ====
This law demands the Executive Branch set the frame for future generations to benefit from a healthy environment, economic development, and stable energy prices considering the current energy policy is heavily reliant on fossil fuels and imports. In this context, the law also sets up Renewable Portfolio Standards and mandatory goals for the generation of renewable energy with short-to-long-term targets.

==== Act No. 33-2019, “Mitigation, Adaptation and Resilience to Climate Change of Puerto Rico Act” ====
This act puts in place the first public policy of Puerto Rico for climate change. This includes starting greenhouse gas accounting and requests the acceptance of a Climate Change Mitigation, Adaptation and Resilience Plan organized by sectors, and defines reduction targets. A Committee of Experts and Advisers on Climate Change, and a Joint Commission on Mitigation, Adaptation and Resilience to Climate Change of the Legislative Assembly were set up and the presentation of first results of the above mandates was scheduled for April 2021.

==== Act No. 17-2019, “Puerto Rico Energy Public Policy Act” ====
The Puerto Rico Energy Public Policy Act No. 17-2019 was signed into law in 2019. This act was the most ambitious clean energy legislation in the Caribbean at the time of its passage. Objectives include:

- 100% renewable energy for all of Puerto Rico by 2050, with the following milestones:
  - 40% renewable energy by 2025
  - 60% renewable energy by 2040
- No solar taxes
- The phaseout of coal-fired generation by 2028
- 30% improvement in energy efficiency by 2040

In January 2024, Governor Pedro Pierluisi signed into law a bill, which was unanimously passed by both chambers of the Puerto Rican legislature, that preserves and extends the commonwealth's retail net metering policy until at least 2030. The law states "It is our responsibility to promote the transformation of our electricity system and promote any initiative that aims to avoid: the excessive dependence on fossil fuels, environmental pollution, and increasing the effects of climate change." Based on this stable regulatory environment, more than 5 GW of solar is forecast to be installed by 2034.

Grid recovery and modernization efforts and renewable energy deployment in Puerto Rico have been bolstered by federal support. Initiatives have included studies and modeling by the U.S. Department of Energy, clean energy workforce development, and billions of dollars in funding to increase energy resilience and solar access.

=== Local initiatives ===
==== Casa Pueblo ====
Casa Pueblo is a community-based voluntary organization that promotes protection of the environment. The organization advocates investment in wind energy, solar energy, and other renewable energy and restructuring energy markets to favor innovation, job creation, and efficient energy use.

==== Caribbean Climate Hub (CCH) ====
The CCH, which is located in Puerto Rico, is part of a network of ten regional hubs working with the U.S. Department of Agriculture (USDA) to provide agricultural workers with scientific knowledge and technical support to react to climate-changed induced events such as droughts and floods in Puerto Rico and the U.S. Virgin Islands. The CCH facilitates collaboration with local and regional agencies, universities, and the public to advance climate-change adaptation.

==== Luquillo Long-Term Ecological Research program (LUQ) ====
The LUQ unites research groups that aim to increase understanding of climate change in a tropical environment and the ability to protect it. Data collected by LUQ is made public, and the organization works with other scientists, students, and volunteers. The group's findings are communicated using print publications or workshops, and also reach policy makers. The initiative is mainly funded by the National Science Foundation, the University of Puerto Rico’s Department of Environmental Sciences, and the USDA Forest Service’s International Institute of Tropical Forestry.

=== International support ===
As a result of the damage and suffering in Puerto Rico caused by natural disasters like[Hurricane Irma, Hurricane Maria, and earthquakes, federal aid programs have been set up to support the Government of Puerto Rico with recovery and reconstruction. The FEMA Public Assistance program has been granted by the President of the United States and provides funding for states, territories, and tribes, and is mainly directed toward the reconstruction of damaged infrastructure.

The Hazard Mitigation Grant Program aims to support disaster planning and prevent future disasters from harming people and property. The program suggests long-term and cost-efficient mitigation plans, and tries to ensures the time of reconstruction after a disaster is simultaneously used to implement respective mitigation measures to reduce the degree of repetitive damage caused by future extreme events.
