= Water crisis =

Water crisis could refer to:

- Water bankruptcy, a condition caused by an overuse of water resource for an extended period to the extent that leads to irreversible ecosystem damages, resulting in systems losing their ability to restore historical ecosystem service baselines.
- Water security, a goal of water management and policy
- Water scarcity, a shortage of water in a specific geography, such as the Cape Town water crisis
- Drought, the meteorological conditions created by lack of precipitation

== Specific events ==
=== Americas ===
==== Chile ====
- Chilean water crisis
- Petorca water crisis

==== Honduras ====
- Water crisis in Honduras

==== United States ====
- Flint water crisis
- Jackson, Mississippi water crisis
- January 2025 Richmond water crisis
- Newark water crisis
- Pittsburgh water crisis
- Red Hill water crisis
- Puerto Rico water crisis

==== Uruguay ====
- 2022–2023 Uruguay drought or water crises

=== Asia ===
- 1998 Klang Valley water crisis
- 2019 Chennai water crisis
- Water crisis in Metro Manila

=== Africa ===
- Cape Town water crisis
- Water crisis in the Democratic Republic of the Congo

=== Oceania ===
- 1998 Sydney water crisis

== See also ==
- Outline of water – Overview of and topical guide to water
- Dewatering
- Environmental_impact_of_AI#Water_usage
- Peak water
