= Water scarcity =

Situation where there is a shortage of water

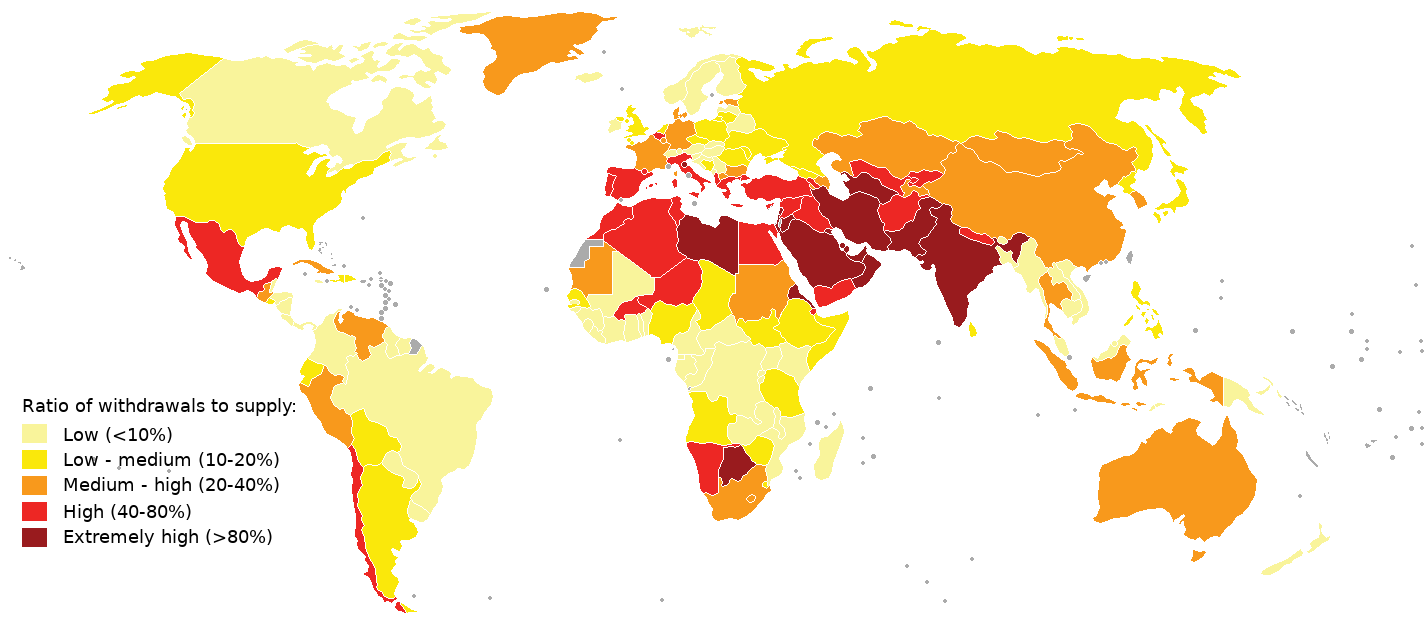
Map of global water stress (a symptom of water scarcity) in 2019. Water stress is the ratio of water use relative to water availability and is therefore a demand-driven scarcity.

Water scarcity (closely related to water stress or water crisis) is the lack of any, local or economically viably transportable, sources of fresh water resources to meet the standard water demand in a region. There are two types of water scarcity. One is physical. The other is economic water scarcity. Physical water scarcity is where there is not enough water to meet all demands. This includes water needed for ecosystems to function. Regions with a desert climate often face physical water scarcity. Central Asia, West Asia, North Africa, and most of Australia are examples of arid areas. Economic water scarcity results from a lack of investment in infrastructure or technology to draw usable water from rivers, aquifers, and other water sources. It also results from weak human capacity to meet water demand. Many people in sub-Saharan Africa are living with economic water scarcity.

There is and has always been enough physical supply of freshwater for current or near or distant future demand in a global scale. As such, water scarcity is caused by a mismatch between when and where people need water, and when and where it is available. This can happen due to an increase in the number of people in a region, changing living conditions and diets, and expansion of irrigated agriculture. Climate change (including droughts or floods), deforestation, water pollution and wasteful use of water can also mean there is not enough water. These variations in scarcity may also be a function of prevailing economic policy and planning approaches.

Water scarcity assessments look at many types of information. They include green water (soil moisture), water quality, environmental flow requirements, and virtual water trade. Water stress is one parameter to measure water scarcity. It is useful in the context of Sustainable Development Goal 6. Half a billion people live in areas with severe water scarcity throughout the year, and around four billion people face severe water scarcity at least one month per year. Half of the world's largest cities experience water scarcity. There are 2.3 billion people who reside in nations with water scarcities (meaning less than 1700 m^{3} of water per person per year).

There are different ways to reduce water scarcity. It can be done through supply and demand side management, cooperation between countries and water conservation. Expanding sources of usable water can help. Reusing wastewater and desalination are ways to do this. Others are reducing water pollution and changes to the virtual water trade.

== Definitions ==
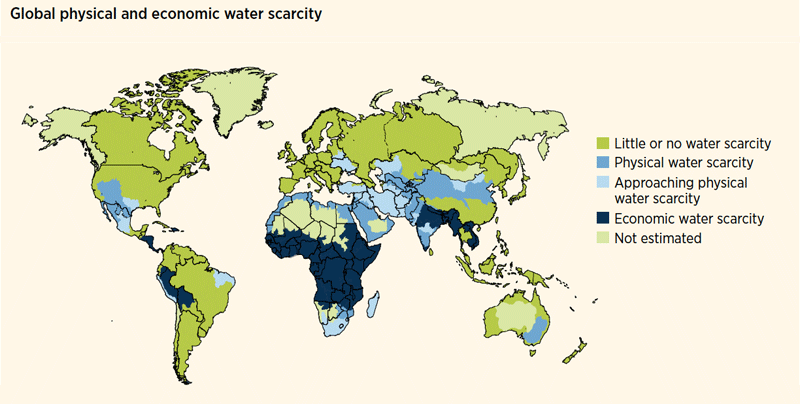
Global physical and economic water scarcity

Water scarcity has been defined as the "volumetric abundance, or lack thereof, of freshwater resources" and it is thought to be "human-driven". This can also be called "physical water scarcity". There are two types of water scarcity. One is physical water scarcity and the other is economic water scarcity. Some definitions of water scarcity look at environmental water requirements. This approach varies from one organization to another.

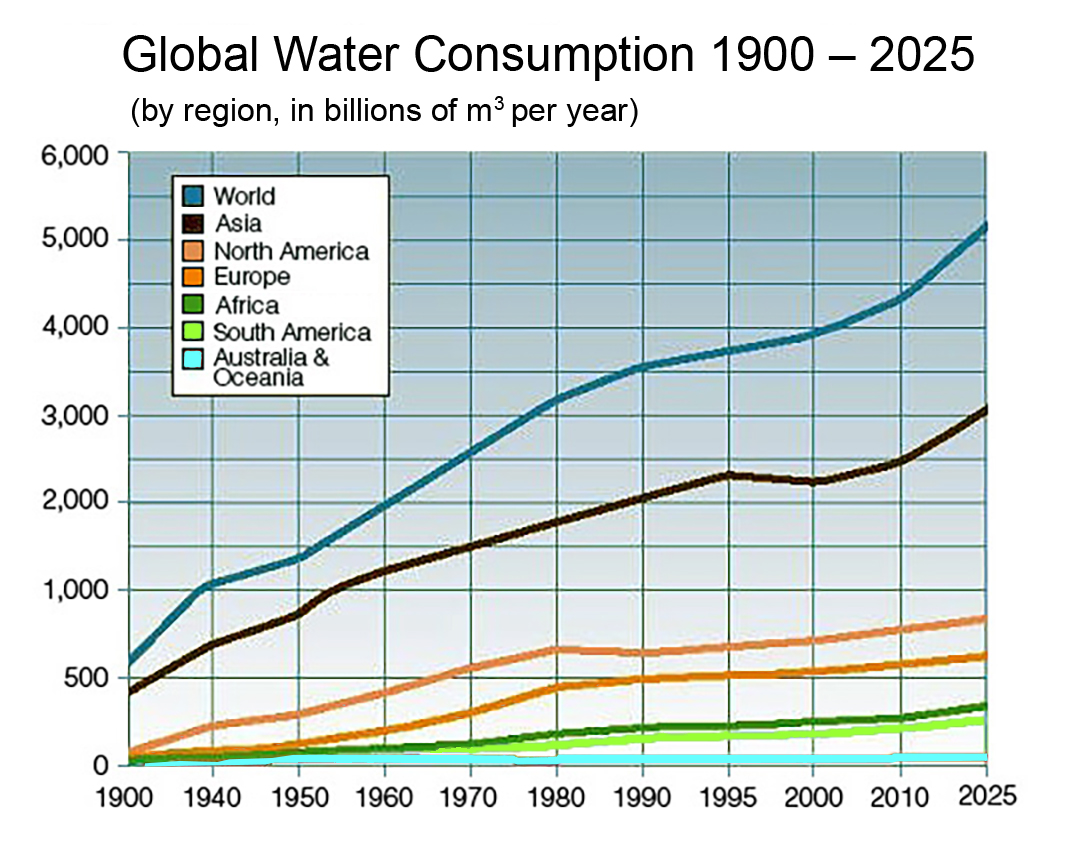
Global water consumption 1900–2025, by region, in billions m^{3} per year

Related concepts are water stress and water risk. The CEO Water Mandate, an initiative of the UN Global Compact, proposed to harmonize these in 2014. In their discussion paper they state that these three terms should not be used interchangeably.

Most water stressed countries in the world in 2020.

Some organizations define water stress as a broader concept. It would include aspects of water availability, water quality and accessibility. Accessibility depends on existing infrastructure. It also depends on whether customers can afford to pay for the water. Some experts call this economic water scarcity.

The FAO defines water stress as the "symptoms of water scarcity or shortage". Such symptoms could be "growing conflict between users, and competition for water, declining standards of reliability and service, harvest failures and food insecurity". This is measured with a range of Water Stress Indices.

A group of scientists provided another definition for water stress in 2016: "Water stress refers to the impact of high water use (either withdrawals or consumption) relative to water availability." This means water stress would be a demand-driven scarcity.

A report published by the UNU Institute for Water, Environment and Health in 2026 points out that the terms “water stress” and “water crisis” are no longer adequate to describe the current global water availability situation. As a result, the UN has adopted the term "water bankruptcy" as a better description for the current state, which signals both the irreversibility and the insolvency of the water system.

== Types ==
Experts have defined two types of water scarcity. One is physical water scarcity. The other is economic water scarcity. These terms were first defined in a 2007 study led by the International Water Management Institute. This examined the use of water in agriculture over the previous 50 years. It aimed to find out if the world had sufficient water resources to produce food for the growing population in the future.

=== Physical water scarcity ===
Physical water scarcity occurs when natural water resources are not enough to meet all demands. This includes water needed for ecosystems to function well. Dry regions often suffer from physical water scarcity. Human influence on climate has intensified water scarcity in areas where it was already a problem. It also occurs where water seems abundant but where resources are over-committed. One example is overdevelopment of hydraulic infrastructure. This can be for irrigation or energy generation. There are several symptoms of physical water scarcity. They include severe environmental degradation, declining groundwater and water allocations favouring some groups over others.

Water is scarce in densely populated arid areas. These are projected to have less than 1000 cubic meters available per capita per year. Examples are Central and West Asia, and North Africa. A study in 2007 found that more than 1.2 billion people live in areas of physical water scarcity. This water scarcity relates to water available for food production, rather than for drinking water which is a much smaller amount.

Some academics propose a separate type of water scarcity termed ecological water scarcity though some publications argue that this falls within the definition of physical water scarcity. It would focus on the water demand of ecosystems, referring to the minimum quantity and quality of water discharge needed to maintain sustainable and functional ecosystems. Results from a modelling study in 2022 show that northern China suffered more severe ecological water scarcity than southern China. The driving factor of ecological water scarcity in most provinces was water pollution rather than human water use.

=== Economic water scarcity ===
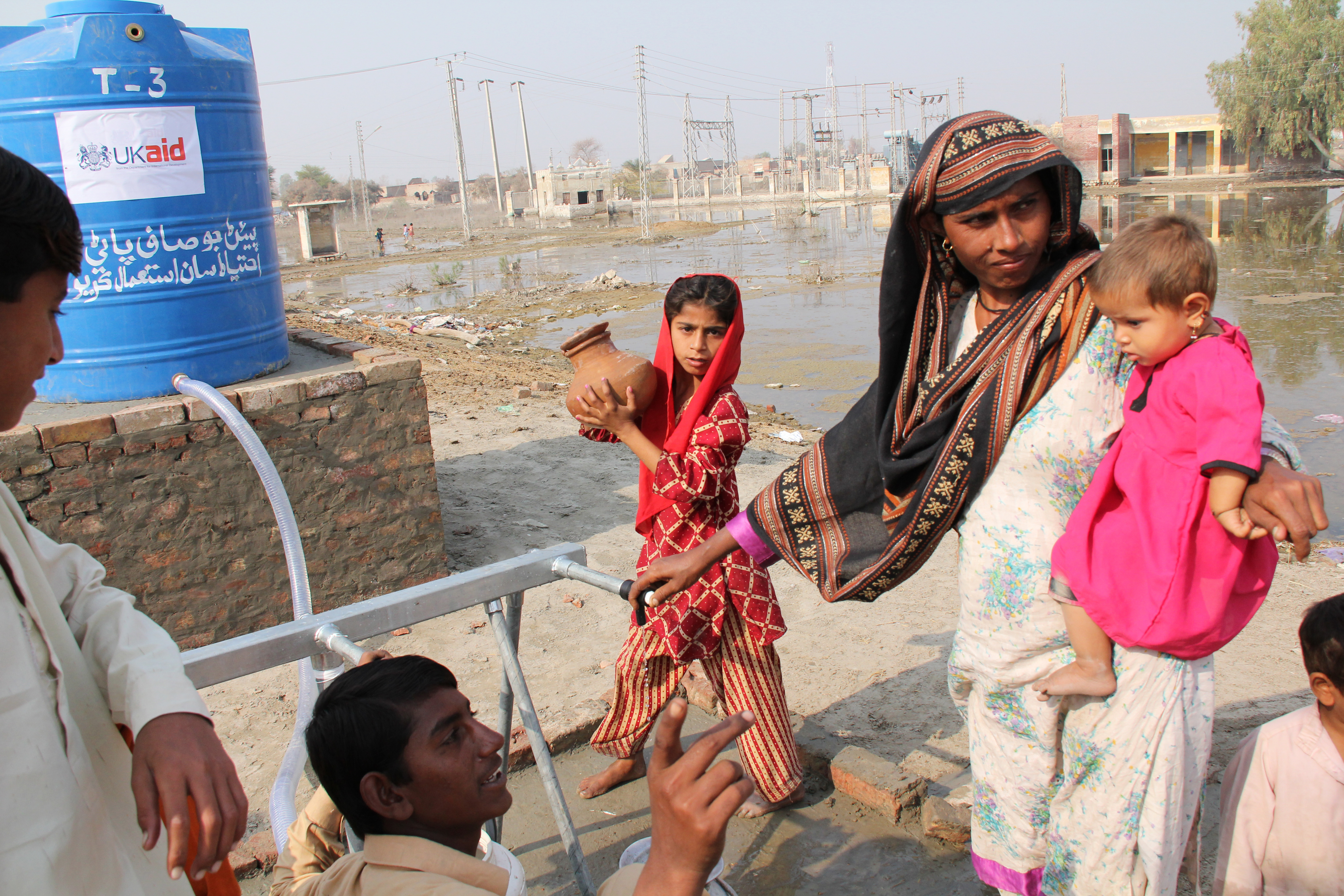
People collect clean drinking water from a tapstand in the town of Alhan ahammed in western Sindh Province in Pakistan.

Economic water scarcity is due to a lack of investment in infrastructure or technology to draw water from rivers, aquifers, or other water sources. It also reflects insufficient human capacity to meet the demand for water. It causes people without reliable water access to travel long distances to fetch water for household and agricultural uses. Such water is often unclean.

The United Nations Development Programme says economic water scarcity is the most common cause of water scarcity. This is because most countries or regions have enough water to meet household, industrial, agricultural, and environmental needs. But they lack the means to provide it in an accessible manner. Around a fifth of the world's population currently live in regions affected by physical water scarcity.

A quarter of the world's population is affected by economic water scarcity. It is a feature of much of Sub-Saharan Africa. So better water infrastructure there could help to reduce poverty. Investing in water retention and irrigation infrastructure would help increase food production. This is especially the case for developing countries that rely on low-yield agriculture. Providing water that is adequate for consumption would also benefit public health. This is not only a question of new infrastructure. Economic and political intervention are necessary to tackle poverty and social inequality. The lack of funding means there is a need for planning.

The emphasis is usually on improving water sources for drinking and domestic purposes. But more water is used for purposes such as bathing, laundry, livestock and cleaning than drinking and cooking. This suggests that too much emphasis on drinking water addresses only part of the problem. So it can limit the range of solutions available.

== Challenges ==
Lake Chad has shrunk by 90% since the 1960s.

=== Simple indicators ===
There are several indicators for measuring water scarcity. One is the water use to availability ratio. This is also known as the criticality ratio. Another is the IWMI Indicator. This measures physical and economic water scarcity. Another is the water poverty index.

"Water stress" is a criterion to measure water scarcity. Experts use it in the context of Sustainable Development Goal 6. A report by the FAO in 2018 provided a definition of water stress. It described it as "the ratio between total freshwater withdrawn (TFWW) by all major sectors and total renewable freshwater resources (TRWR), after taking into account environmental flow requirements (EFR)". This means that the value for TFWW is divided by the difference between TRWR minus EFR. Environmental flows are water flows required to sustain freshwater and estuarine ecosystems. A previous definition in Millennium Development Goal 7, target 7.A, was simply the proportion of total water resources used, without taking EFR into consideration. This definition sets out several categories for water stress. Below 10% is low stress; 10-20% is low-to-medium; 20-40% medium-to-high; 40-80% high; above 80% very high.

Indicators are used to measure the extent of water scarcity. One way to measure water scarcity is to calculate the amount of water resources available per person each year. One example is the "Falkenmark Water Stress Indicator". This was developed by Malin Falkenmark. This indicator says a country or region experiences "water stress" when annual water supplies drop below 1,700 cubic meters per person per year. Levels between 1,700 and 1,000 cubic meters will lead to periodic or limited water shortages. When water supplies drop below 1,000 cubic meters per person per year the country faces "water scarcity". However, the Falkenmark Water Stress Indicator does not help to explain the true nature of water scarcity.

==== Renewable freshwater resources ====
It is also possible to measure water scarcity by looking at renewable freshwater. Experts use it when evaluating water scarcity. This metric can describe the total available water resources each country contains. This total available water resource gives an idea of whether a country tends to experience physical water scarcity. This metric has a drawback because it is an average. Precipitation delivers water unevenly across the planet each year. So annual renewable water resources vary from year to year. This metric does not describe how easy it is for individuals, households, industries or government to access water. Lastly this metric gives a description of a whole country. So it does not accurately portray whether a country is experiencing water scarcity. For example, Canada and Brazil both have very high levels of available water supply. But they still face various water-related problems. Some tropical countries in Asia and Africa have low levels of freshwater resources.

=== More sophisticated indicators ===
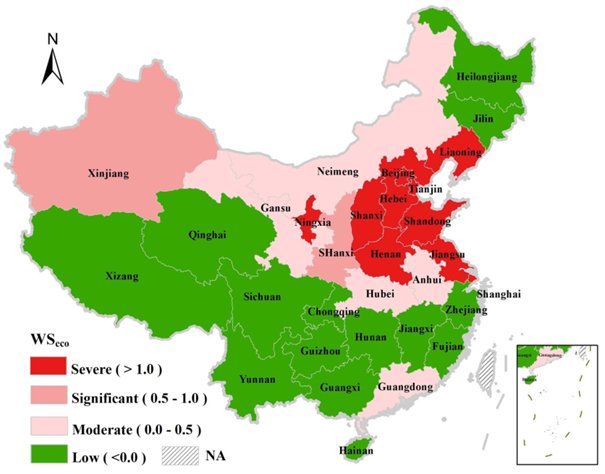
Average ecological water scarcity at the provincial level in China 2016-2019.

Water scarcity assessments must include several types of information. They include data on green water (soil moisture), water quality, environmental flow requirements, globalisation, and virtual water trade. Since the early 2000s, water scarcity assessments have used more complex models. These benefit from spatial analysis tools. Green-blue water scarcity is one of these. Footprint-based water scarcity assessment is another. Another is cumulative abstraction to demand ratio, which considers temporal variations. Further examples are LCA-based water stress indicators and integrated water quantity–quality environment flow. Since the early 2010s assessments have looked at water scarcity from both quantity and quality perspectives.

A successful assessment will bring together experts from several scientific discipline. These include the hydrological, water quality, aquatic ecosystem science, and social science communities.

== Available water ==
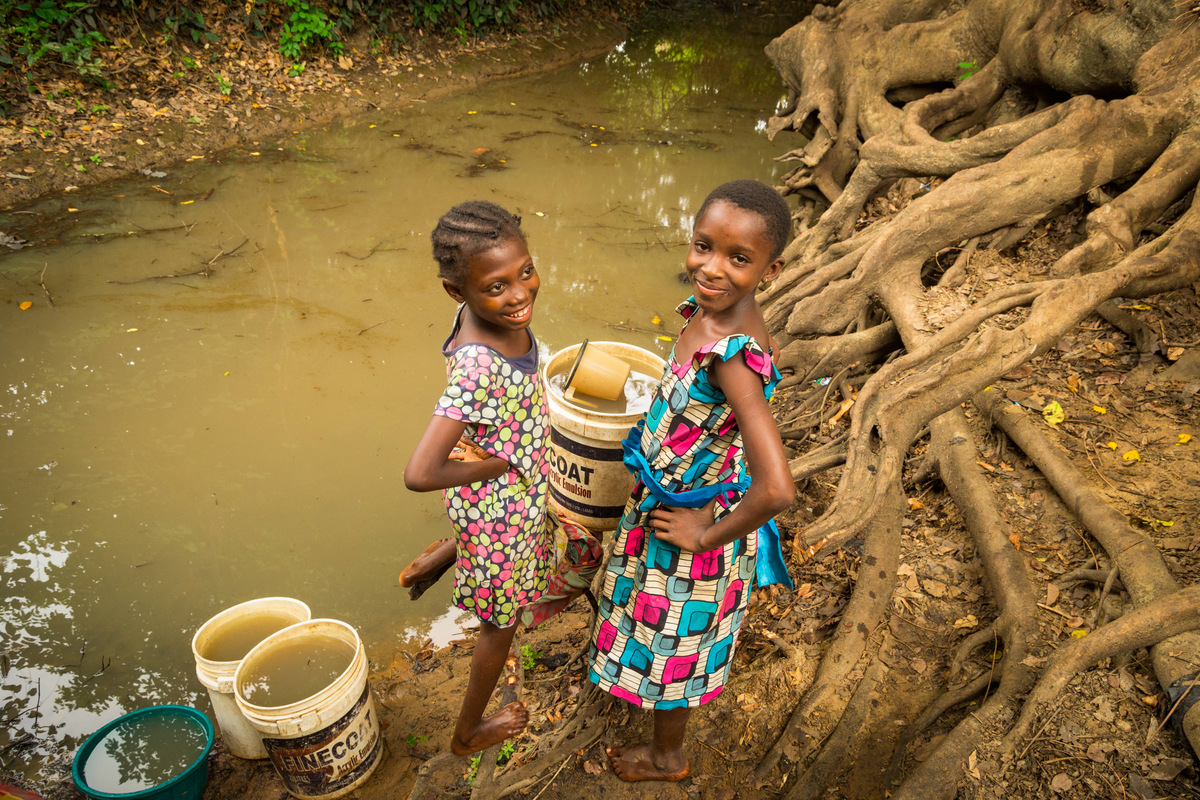
Children fetch water from a muddy stream in a rural area during dry season. The water is taken back home and undergoes filtration and other treatments before usage.

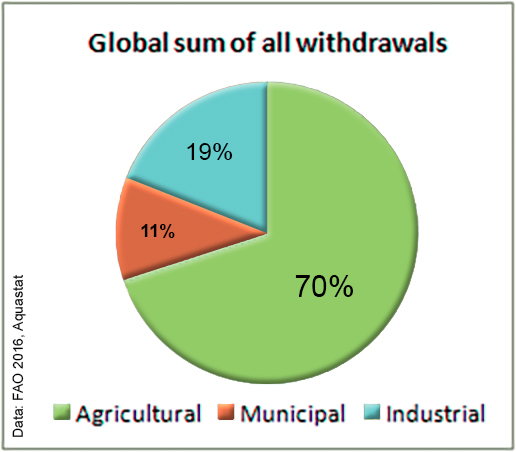
Global use of freshwater, 2016 FAO data

The United Nations estimates that only 200,000 cubic kilometers of the total 1.4 billion cubic kilometers of water on Earth is freshwater available for human consumption. A mere 0.014% of all water on Earth is both fresh and easily accessible. Of the remaining water, 97% is saline, and a little less than 3% is difficult to access. The fresh water available to us on the planet is around 1% of the total water on earth. The total amount of easily accessible freshwater on Earth is 14,000 cubic kilometers. This takes the form of surface water such as rivers and lakes or groundwater, for example in aquifers. Of this total amount, humanity uses and resuses just 5,000 cubic kilometers. Technically, there is a sufficient amount of freshwater on a global scale. So in theory there is more than enough freshwater available to meet the demands of the current world population of 8 billion people. There is even enough to support population growth to 9 billion or more. But unequal geographical distribution and unequal consumption of water makes it a scarce resource in some regions and groups of people.

Rivers and lakes provide common surface sources of freshwater. But other water resources such as groundwater and glaciers have become more developed sources of freshwater. They have become the main source of clean water. Groundwater is water that has pooled below the surface of the Earth. It can provide a usable quantity of water through springs or wells. These areas of groundwater are also known as aquifers. It is becoming harder to use conventional sources because of pollution and climate change. So people are drawing more and more on these other sources. Population growth is encouraging greater use of these types of water resources.

== Scale ==
=== Current estimates ===
In 2019 the World Economic Forum listed water scarcity as one of the largest global risks in terms of potential impact over the next decade. Water scarcity can take several forms. One is a failure to meet demand for water, partially or totally. Other examples are economic competition for water quantity or quality, disputes between users, irreversible depletion of groundwater, and negative impacts on the environment.

About half of the world's population currently experience severe water scarcity for at least some part of the year. Half a billion people in the world face severe water scarcity all year round. Half of the world's largest cities experience water scarcity. Almost two billion people do not currently have access to clean drinking water. A study in 2016 calculated that the number of people suffering from water scarcity increased from 0.24 billion (14% of global population) in 1906 to 3.8 billion (58%) in 2004, (according to United Nations estimates from 2024), but eventually, it increased further to 6.2 billion (75% of the global population) in 2025, raising concerns of famine and instability. This study used two concepts to analyse water scarcity. One is shortage, or impacts due to low availability per capita. The other is stress, or impacts due to high consumption relative to availability.

=== Future predictions ===
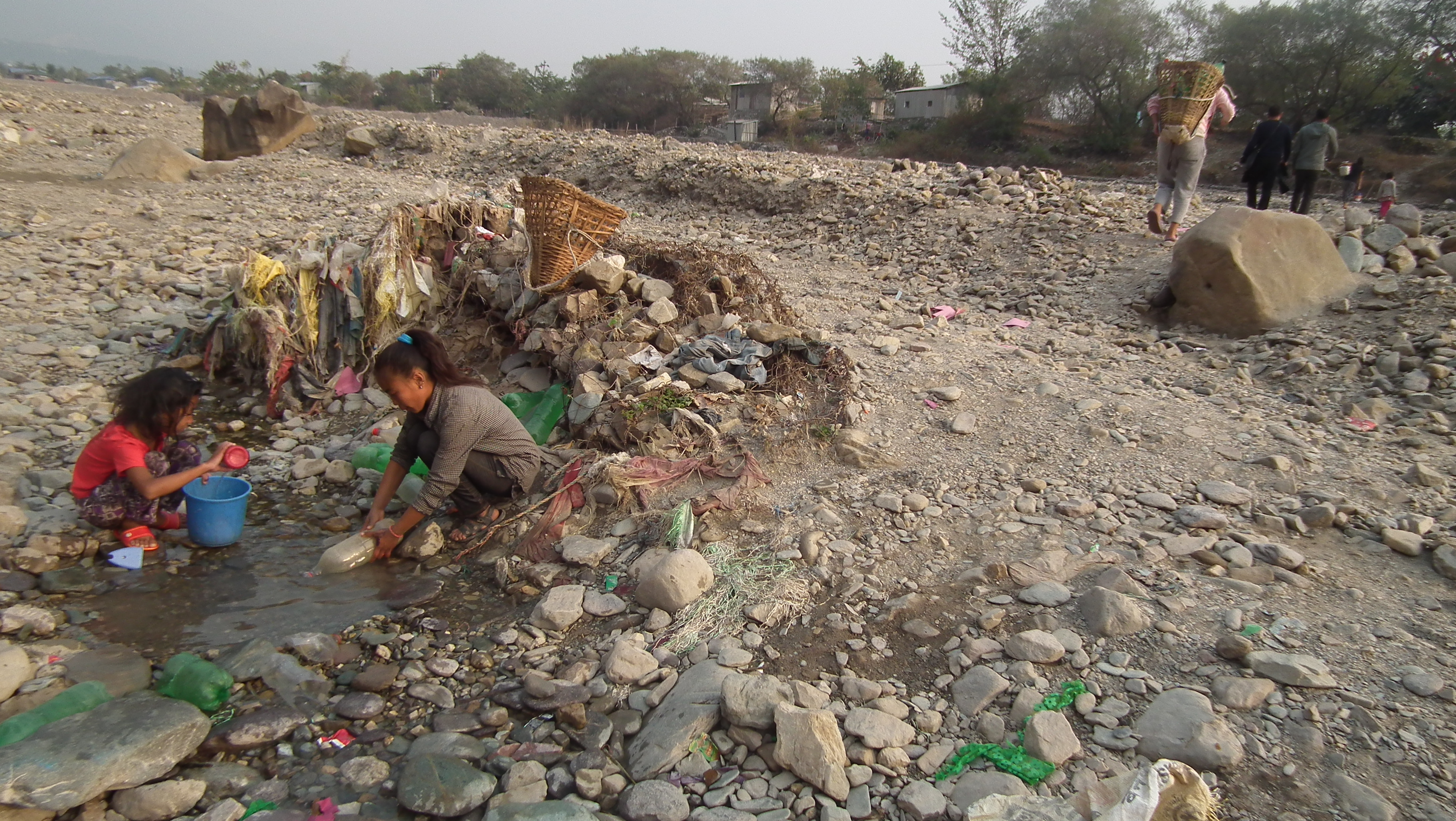
Girls of squatter settlement in Dharan collect water from river

In the 20th century, water use has been growing at more than twice the rate of the population increase. Specifically, water withdrawals are likely to rise by 50 percent by 2025 in developing countries, and 18 per cent in developed countries. One continent, for example, Africa, has been predicted to have 75 to 250 million inhabitants lacking access to fresh water. By 2025, 1.8 billion people will be living in countries or regions with absolute water scarcity, and two-thirds of the world population could be under stress conditions. By 2050, more than half of the world's population will live in water-stressed areas, and another billion may lack sufficient water, MIT researchers find.

With the increase in global temperatures and an increase in water demand, six out of ten people are at risk of being water-stressed. The drying out of wetlands globally, at around 67%, was a direct cause of a large number of people at risk of water stress. As global demand for water increases and temperatures rise, it is likely that two thirds of the population will live under water stress in 2025.

According to a projection by the United Nations, by 2040, there can be about 4.5 billion people affected by a water crisis (or water scarcity). Additionally, with the increase in population, there will be a demand for food, and for the food output to match the population growth, there would be an increased demand for water to irrigate crops. The World Economic Forum estimates that global water demand will surpass global supply by 40% by 2030. Increasing the water demand as well as increasing the population results in a water crisis where there is not enough water to share in healthy levels. The crises are not only due to quantity but quality also matters.

A study found that 6-20% of about 39 million groundwater wells are at high risk of running dry if local groundwater levels decline by a few meters. In many areas and with possibly more than half of major aquifers this would apply if they simply continue to decline.

== Impacts ==
=== Water supply shortages ===
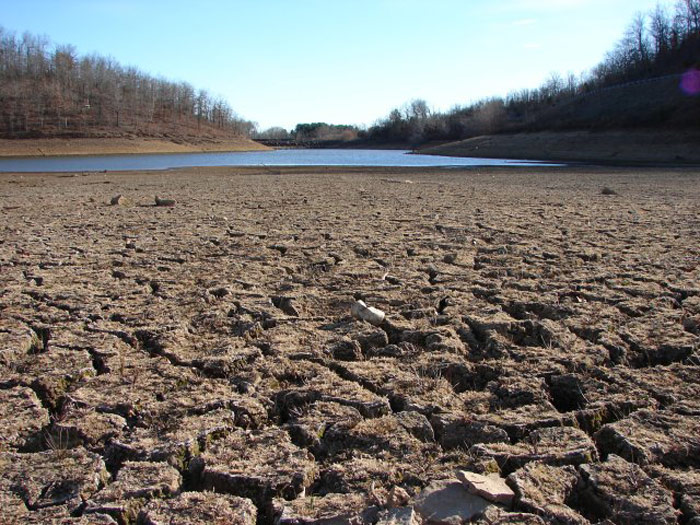
A typical dry lakebed is seen in California, which was experiencing its worst megadrought in 1,200 years (as of 2022), precipitated by climate change, and is therefore water rationing.

Controllable factors such as the management and distribution of the water supply can contribute to scarcity. A 2006 United Nations report focuses on issues of governance as the core of the water crisis. The report noted that: "There is enough water for everyone". It also said: "Water insufficiency is often due to mismanagement, corruption, lack of appropriate institutions, bureaucratic inertia and a shortage of investment in both human capacity and physical infrastructure".

Economists and others have argued that a lack of property rights, government regulations and water subsidies have given rise to the situation with water. These factors cause prices to be too low and consumption too high, making a point for water privatization.

The clean water crisis is an emerging global crisis affecting approximately 785 million people around the world. 1.1 billion people lack access to water and 2.7 billion experience water scarcity at least one month in a year. 2.4 billion people suffer from contaminated water and poor sanitation. Contamination of water can lead to deadly diarrheal diseases such as cholera and typhoid fever and other waterborne diseases. These account for 80% of illnesses around the world.

=== Environment ===
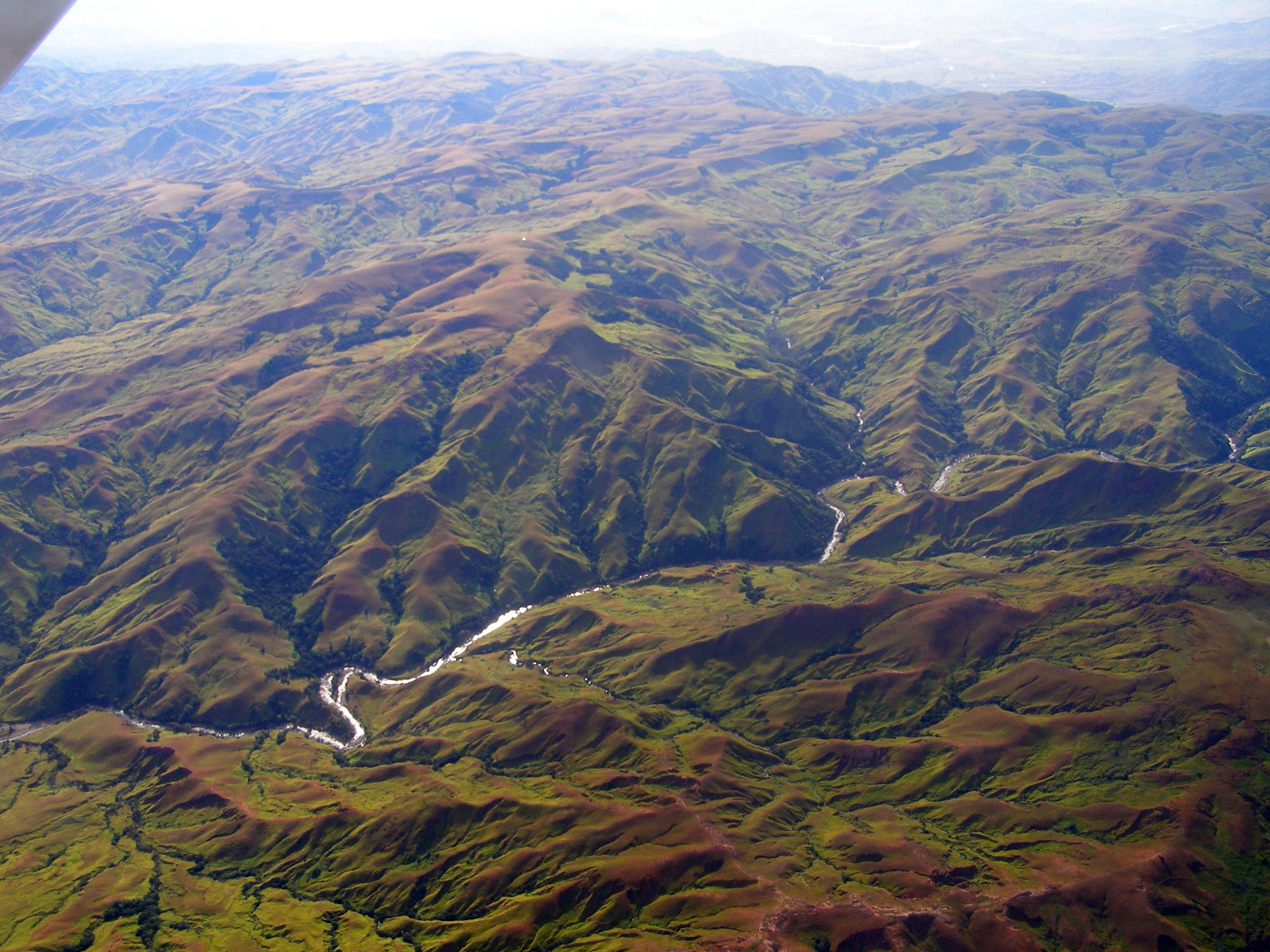
Deforestation of the Madagascar Highland Plateau has led to extensive siltation and unstable flows of western rivers.

Using water for domestic, food and industrial uses has major impacts on ecosystems in many parts of the world. This can apply even to regions not considered "water scarce". Water scarcity damages the environment in many ways. These include adverse effects on lakes, rivers, ponds, wetlands and other fresh water resources. Thus results in water overuse because water is scarce. This often occurs in areas of irrigation agriculture. It can harm the environment in several ways. This includes increased salinity, nutrient pollution, and the loss of floodplains and wetlands. Water scarcity also makes it harder to use flow to rehabilitate urban streams.

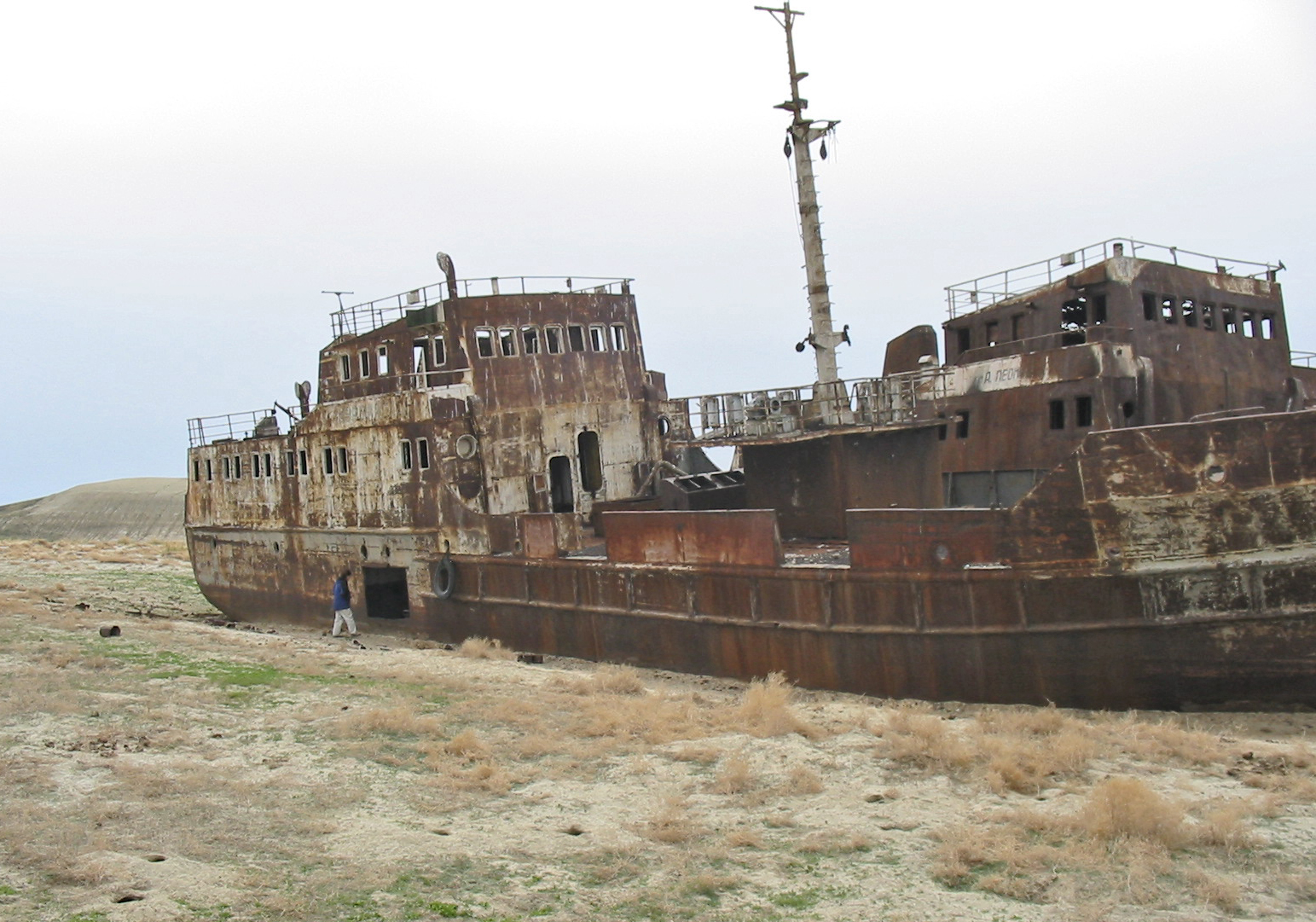
An abandoned ship in the former Aral Sea, near Aral, Kazakhstan

Through the last hundred years, more than half of the Earth's wetlands have been destroyed and have disappeared. These wetlands are important as the habitats of numerous creatures such as mammals, birds, fish, amphibians, and invertebrates. They also support the growing of rice and other food crops. And they provide water filtration and protection from storms and flooding. Freshwater lakes such as the Aral Sea in central Asia have also suffered. It was once the fourth largest freshwater lake in the world. But it has lost more than 58,000 square km of area and vastly increased in salt concentration over the span of three decades.

Subsidence is another result of water scarcity. The U.S. Geological Survey estimates that subsidence has affected more than 17,000 square miles in 45 U.S. states, 80 percent of it due to groundwater usage.

Vegetation and wildlife need sufficient freshwater. Marshes, bogs and riparian zones are more clearly dependent upon sustainable water supply. Forests and other upland ecosystems are equally at risk as water becomes less available. In the case of wetlands, a lot of ground has been simply taken from wildlife use to feed and house the expanding human population. Other areas have also suffered from a gradual fall in freshwater inflow as upstream water is diverted for human use.

=== Potential for conflict ===
Other impacts include growing conflict between users and growing competition for water. Examples for the potential for conflict from water scarcity include: Food insecurity in the Middle East and North Africa Region and regional conflicts over scarce water resources.

== Causes and contributing factors ==
=== Population growth ===
Around 1970s, the common view was that water was an infinite resource. At that time, there were fewer than half the current number of people on the planet. People were not as wealthy as today, consumed fewer calories and ate less meat, so less water was needed to produce their food. They required a third of the volume of water we presently take from rivers. Today, the competition for water resources is much more intense. This is because there are now seven billion people on the planet and their consumption of water-thirsty meat is rising. And industry, urbanization, biofuel crops, and water reliant food items are competing more and more for water. In the future, even more water will be needed to produce food because the Earth's population is forecast to rise to 9 billion by 2050.

In 2000, the world population was 6.2 billion. The UN estimates that by 2050 there will be an additional 3.5 billion people, with most of the growth in developing countries that already suffer water stress. This will increase demand for water unless there are corresponding increases in water conservation and recycling. In building on the data presented here by the UN, the World Bank goes on to explain that access to water for producing food will be one of the main challenges in the decades to come. It will be necessary to balance access to water with managing water in a sustainable way. At the same time it will be necessary to take the impact of climate change and other environmental and social variables into account.

In 60% of European cities with more than 100,000 people, groundwater is being used at a faster rate than it can be replenished.

==== Over-exploitation of groundwater ====
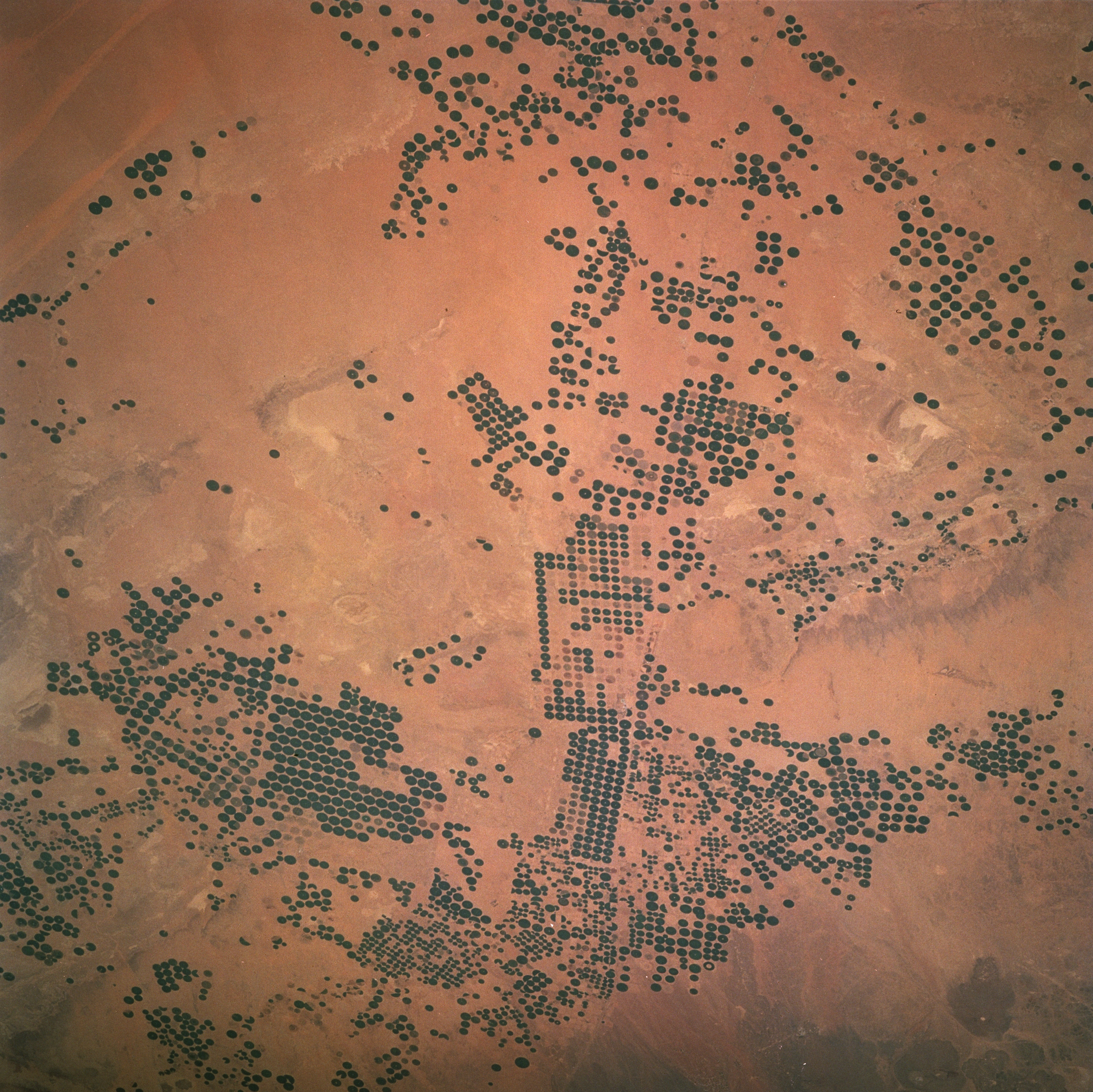
Pivot irrigation in Saudi Arabia, April 1997. Saudi Arabia is suffering from a major depletion of the water in its underground aquifers.

The increase in the number of people is increasing competition for water. This is depleting many of the world's major aquifers. It has two causes. One is direct human consumption. The other is agricultural irrigation. Millions of pumps of all sizes are currently extracting groundwater throughout the world. Irrigation in dry areas such as northern China, Nepal and India draws on groundwater. And it is extracting groundwater at an unsustainable rate. Many cities have experienced aquifer drops of between 10 and 50 meters. They include Mexico City, Bangkok, Beijing, Chennai and Shanghai.

Until recently, groundwater was not a highly used resource. In the 1960s, more and more groundwater aquifers developed. Improved knowledge, technology and funding have made it possible to focus more on drawing water from groundwater resources instead of surface water. These made the agricultural groundwater revolution possible. They expanded the irrigation sector which made it possible to increase food production and development in rural areas. Groundwater supplies nearly half of all drinking water in the world. The large volumes of water stored underground in most aquifers have a considerable buffer capacity. This makes it possible to withdraw water during periods of drought or little rainfall. This is crucial for people that live in regions that cannot depend on precipitation or surface water for their only supplies. It provides reliable access to water all year round. As of 2010, the world's aggregated groundwater abstraction is estimated at 1,000 km^{3}per year. Of this 67% goes on irrigation, 22% on domestic purposes and 11% on industrial purposes. The top ten major consumers of abstracted water make up 72% of all abstracted water use worldwide. They are India, China, United States of America, Pakistan, Iran, Bangladesh, Mexico, Saudi Arabia, Indonesia, and Italy.

Goundwater sources are quite plentiful. But one major area of concern is the renewal or recharge rate of some groundwater sources. Extracting from non-rewable groundwater sources could exhaust them if they are not properly monitored and managed. Increasing use of groundwater can also reduce water quality over time. Groundwater systems often show falls in natural outflows, stored volumes, and water levels as well as water degradation. Groundwater depletion can cause harm in many ways. These include more costly groundwater pumping and changes in salinity and other types of water quality. They can also lead to land subsidence, degraded springs and reduced baseflows.

=== Expansion of agricultural and industrial users ===
About 1.9 trillion gallons of water are consumed within the Colorado River basin in a typical year, contributing to a severe water shortage and causing states to reach a conservation and resource-sharing agreement with the federal government. Most of the Colorado River basin water used by humans is used to grow feed for livestock—more than four times the amount used for crops for direct human consumption.

The main cause of water scarcity as a result of consumption is the extensive use of water in agriculture/livestock breeding and industry. People in developed countries generally use about 10 times more water a day than people in developing countries. A large part of this is indirect use in water-intensive agricultural and industrial production of consumer goods. Examples are fruit, oilseed crops and cotton. Many of these production chains are globalized, So a lot of water consumption and pollution in developing countries occurs to produce goods for consumption in developed countries.

Many aquifers have been over-pumped and are not recharging quickly. This does not use up the total fresh water supply. But it means that much has become polluted, salted, unsuitable or otherwise unavailable for drinking, industry and agriculture. To avoid a global water crisis, farmers will have to increase productivity to meet growing demands for food. At the same time industry and cities find will have to find ways to use water more efficiently.

Business activities such as tourism are continuing to expand. They create a need for increases in water supply and sanitation. This in turn can lead to more pressure on water resources and natural ecosystems. The approximate 50% growth in world energy use by 2040 will also increase the need for efficient water use. It may means some water use shifts from irrigation to industry. This is because thermal power generation uses water for steam generation and cooling.

=== Water pollution ===
Water pollution (or aquatic pollution) is the contamination of water bodies, which has a negative impact on how they can be used. It is usually caused by human activities. Water bodies include surface water (lakes, rivers, oceans, reservoirs) and groundwater. Water pollution results when contaminants mix with these water bodies. Contaminants can come from one of four main sources. These are sewage discharges, industrial activities, agricultural activities, and urban runoff including stormwater.

This form of pollution can lead to many problems. One is the degradation of aquatic ecosystems. Another is spreading water-borne diseases when people use polluted water for drinking or irrigation. Water pollution also reduces the ecosystem services such as drinking water provided by the water resource.

=== Climate change ===
Climate change could have a big impact on water resources around the world because of the close connections between the climate and hydrological cycle. Rising temperatures will increase evaporation and lead to increases in precipitation. However there will be regional variations in rainfall. Both droughts and floods may become more frequent and more severe in different regions at different times. There will be generally less snowfall and more rainfall in a warmer climate. Changes in snowfall and snow melt in mountainous areas will also take place. Higher temperatures will also affect water quality in ways that scientists do not fully understand. Possible impacts include increased eutrophication. Climate change could also boost demand for irrigation systems in agriculture. There is now ample evidence that greater hydrologic variability and climate change have had a profound impact on the water sector, and will continue to do so. This will show up in the hydrologic cycle, water availability, water demand, and water allocation at the global, regional, basin, and local levels.

The United Nations' FAO states that by 2025 1.9 billion people will live in countries or regions with absolute water scarcity. It says two thirds of the world's population could be under stress conditions. The World Bank says that climate change could profoundly alter future patterns of water availability and use. This will make water stress and insecurity worse, at the global level and in sectors that depend on water.

Scientists have found that population change is four times more important than long-term climate change in its effects on water scarcity.

==== Retreat of mountain glaciers ====
A video describing the impacts of global warming and melting on Everest and the surrounding Himalayas, and the downstream impacts on communities that use that water.

The continued retreat of glaciers will have a number of different quantitative effects. In areas that are heavily dependent on water runoff from glaciers that melt during the warmer summer months, a continuation of the current retreat will eventually deplete the glacial ice and substantially reduce or eliminate runoff. A reduction in runoff will affect the ability to irrigate crops and will reduce summer stream flows necessary to keep dams and reservoirs replenished. This situation is particularly acute for irrigation in South America, where numerous artificial lakes are filled almost exclusively by glacial melt. Central Asian countries have also been historically dependent on the seasonal glacier melt water for irrigation and drinking supplies. In Norway, the Alps, and the Pacific Northwest of North America, glacier runoff is important for hydropower.

In the Himalayas, retreating glaciers could reduce summer water flows by up to two thirds. In the Ganges area, this would cause a water shortage for 500 million people. In the Hindu Kush Himalaya area, around 1.4 billion people are dependent on the five main rivers of the Himalaya mountains. Although the impact will vary from place to place, the amount of meltwater is likely to increase at first as glaciers retreat. Then it will gradually decrease because of the fall in glacier mass.

== Options for improvements ==
=== Supply and demand side management ===
A review in 2006 stated that "It is surprisingly difficult to determine whether water is truly scarce in the physical sense at a global scale (a supply problem) or whether it is available but should be used better (a demand problem)".

The International Resource Panel of the UN states that governments have invested heavily in inefficient solutions. These are mega-projects like dams, canals, aqueducts, pipelines and water reservoirs. They are generally neither environmentally sustainable nor economically viable. According to the panel, the most cost-effective way of decoupling water use from economic growth is for governments to create holistic water management plans. These would take into account the entire water cycle: from source to distribution, economic use, treatment, recycling, reuse and return to the environment.

In general, there is enough water on an annual and global scale. The issue is more of variation of supply by time and by region. Reservoirs and pipelines would deal with this variable water supply. Well-planned infrastructure with demand side management is necessary. Both supply-side and demand-side management have advantages and disadvantages.

=== Co-operation between countries ===
Lack of cooperation may give rise to regional water conflicts. This is especially the case in developing countries. The main reason is disputes regarding the availability, use and management of water. One example is the dispute between Egypt and Ethiopia over the Grand Ethiopian Renaissance Dam which escalated in 2020. Egypt sees the dam as an existential threat, fearing that the dam will reduce the amount of water it receives from the Nile.

=== Water conservation ===
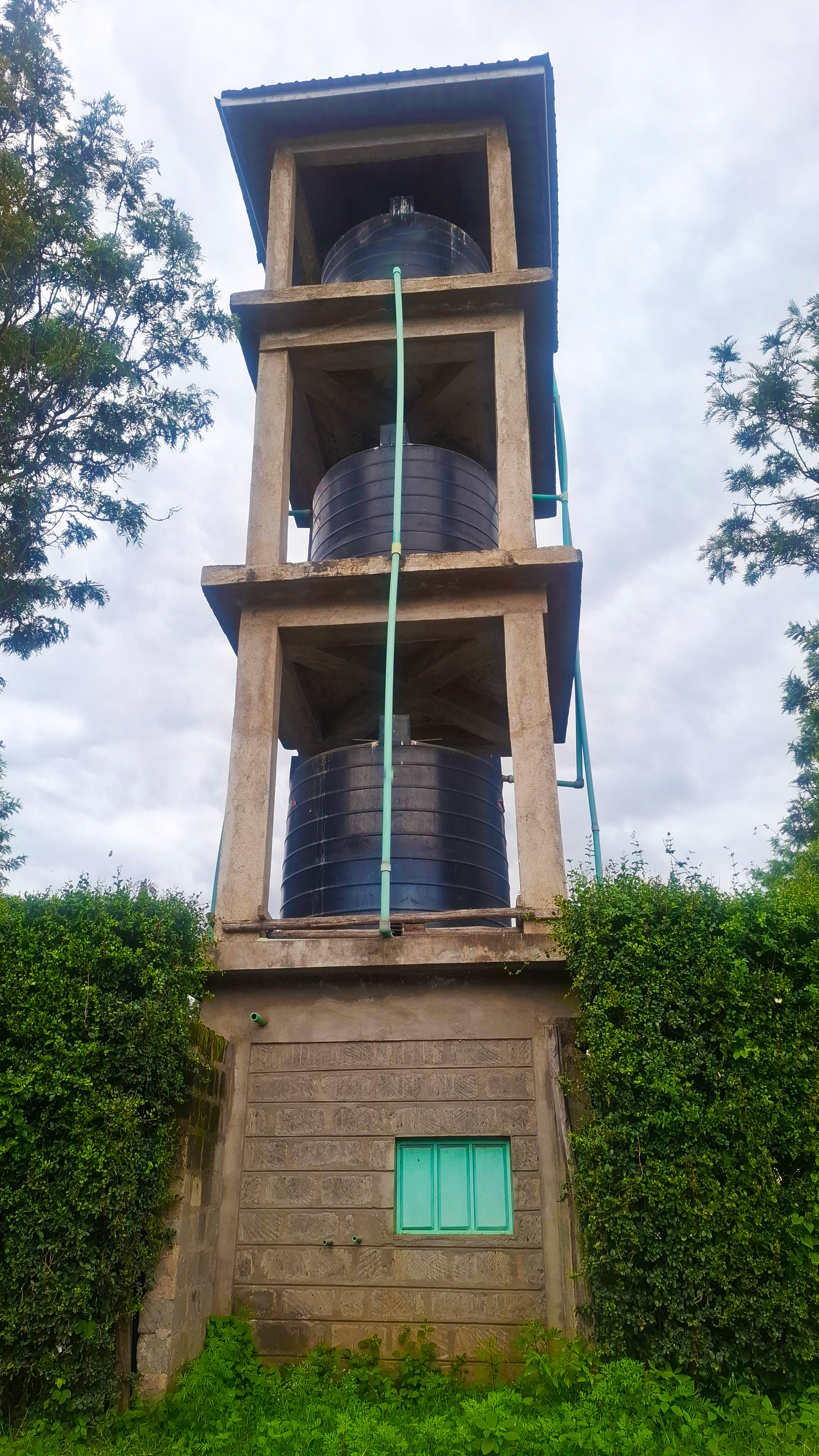
Rain water harvesting-Rongai, Kenya

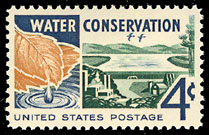
United States 1960 postal stamp advocating water conservation

Water conservation aims to sustainably manage the natural resource of fresh water, protect the hydrosphere, and meet current and future human demand. Water conservation makes it possible to avoid water scarcity. It covers all the policies, strategies and activities to reach these aims. Population, household size and growth and affluence all affect how much water is used.

Although the terms "water efficiency" and "water conservation" are used interchangeably they are not the same. Water efficiency is the improvements such as the new technology that help with the efficiency and reduction of using water. On the other hand, water conservation is the action of conserving water. In short, water efficiency relates to the development and innovations which help use water more efficiently and water conservation is the act of saving or preserving water.

=== Expanding sources of usable water ===
This refers to structured systems designed by humans for the collection, storage, treatment, and the convertion of water for human use. The purpose of this system is to help mitigate the shortage of water especially in regions where there is little to no rainfall or high demand of water. There are several artificial sources of fresh water; treated wastewater (reclaimed water), atmospheric water generators and Desalinated seawater. Other important sources includes: rainwater harvesting systems, wells, and boreholes, artificial recharge ponds, dams and reservoirs. It is important to consider the economic and environmental side effects of these technologies.

==== Wastewater treatment and reclaimed water ====
Water reclamation is the process of converting municipal wastewater or sewage and industrial wastewater into water that can be reused for a variety of purposes. It is also called wastewater reuse, water reuse or water recycling. There are many types of reuse. It is possible to reuse water in this way in cities or for irrigation in agriculture. Other types of reuse are environmental reuse, industrial reuse, and reuse for drinking water, whether planned or not. Reuse may include irrigation of gardens and agricultural fields or replenishing surface water and groundwater. This latter is also known as groundwater recharge. Reused water also serve various needs in residences such as toilet flushing, businesses, and industry. It is possible to treat wastewater to reach drinking water standards. Injecting reclaimed water into the water supply distribution system is known as direct potable reuse. Drinking reclaimed water is not typical. Reusing treated municipal wastewater for irrigation is a long-established practice. This is especially so in arid countries. Reusing wastewater as part of sustainable water management allows water to remain an alternative water source for human activities. This can reduce scarcity. It also eases pressures on groundwater and other natural water bodies.

Wastewater treatment is a process which removes contaminants from wastewater. The resulting effluent, discharged to a water body, has an acceptable impact on the environment. Domestic wastewater, also called municipal wastewater or sewage, is processed at a sewage treatment plant. Industrial wastewater is often processed at a specially-designed industrial wastewater treatment facility, or at a sewage treatment plant. In the latter case the industry typically performs on-site pretreatment of the waste, before it is sent to the municipal plant. Other types of wastewater treatment plants include agricultural wastewater treatment and leachate treatment plants.

The term "wastewater treatment" is often used to mean "sewage treatment".

==== Desalination ====
Desalination is the artificial process by which salt water (generally sea water) is converted to fresh water. More generally, desalination is the removal of salts and minerals from a substance. It is possible to desalinate saltwater, especially sea water, to produce water for human consumption or irrigation, producing brine as a by-product.

=== Virtual water trade ===
The virtual water trade is the hidden flow of water in food or other commodities that are traded from one place to another. Other terms for it are embedded or embodied water. The virtual water trade is the idea that virtual water is exchanged along with goods and services. This idea provides a new, amplified perspective on water problems. It balances different perspectives, basic conditions, and interests. This concept makes it possible to distinguish between global, regional, and local levels and their linkages. However, the use of virtual water estimates may offer no guidance for policymakers seeking to ensure they are meeting environmental objectives.

For example, cereal grains have been major carriers of virtual water in countries where water resources are scarce. So cereal imports can compensate for local water deficits. However, low-income countries may not be able to afford such imports in the future. This could lead to food insecurity and starvation.

== Regional examples ==
=== Overview of regions ===
Level of water stress by major river basin, 2018–2021.

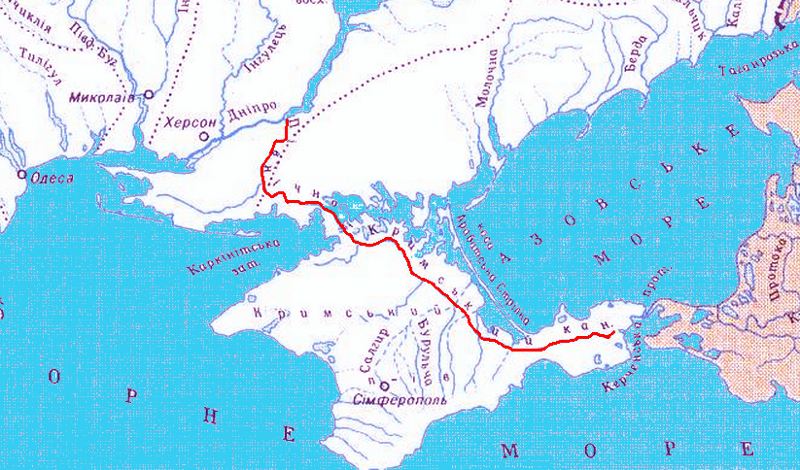
Following Russia's annexation of Crimea, Ukraine blocked the North Crimean Canal, which provided 85% of Crimea's fresh water.

The Consultative Group on International Agricultural Research (CGIAR) published a map showing the countries and regions suffering most water stress. They are North Africa, the Middle East, India, Central Asia, China, Chile, Colombia, South Africa, Canada and Australia. Water scarcity is also increasing in South Asia. As of 2016, about four billion people, or two thirds of the world's population, were facing severe water scarcity.

The more developed countries of North America, Europe and Russia will not see a serious threat to water supply by 2025 in general. This is not only because of their relative wealth. Their populations will also be more in line with available water resources. North Africa, the Middle East, South Africa and northern China will face very severe water shortages. This is due to physical scarcity and too many people for the water that is available. Most of South America, Sub-Saharan Africa, southern China and India will face water supply shortages by 2025. For these regions, water scarcity will be due to economic constraints on developing safe drinking water, and excessive population growth.

=== Africa ===
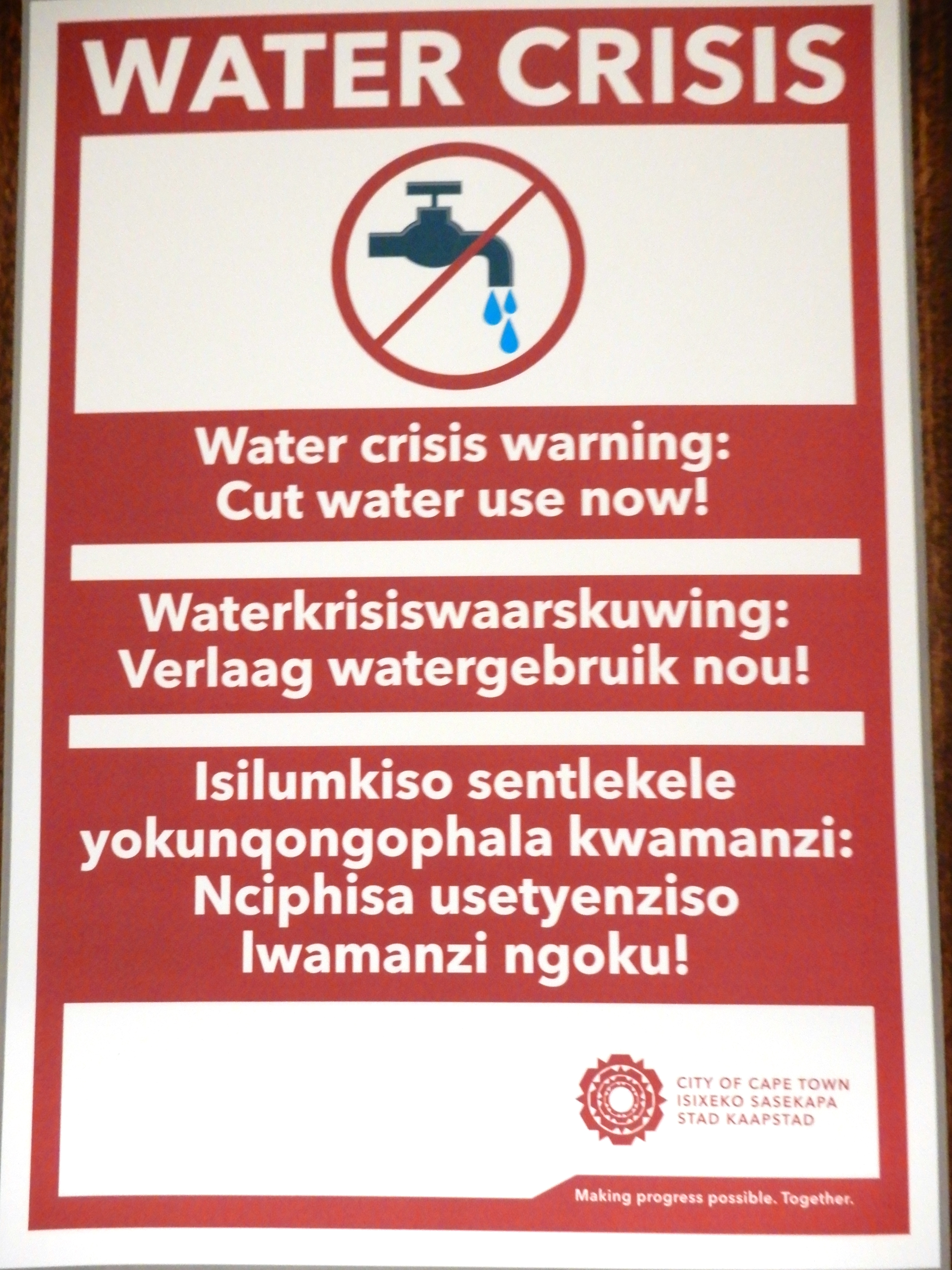
Cape Town water crisis warning

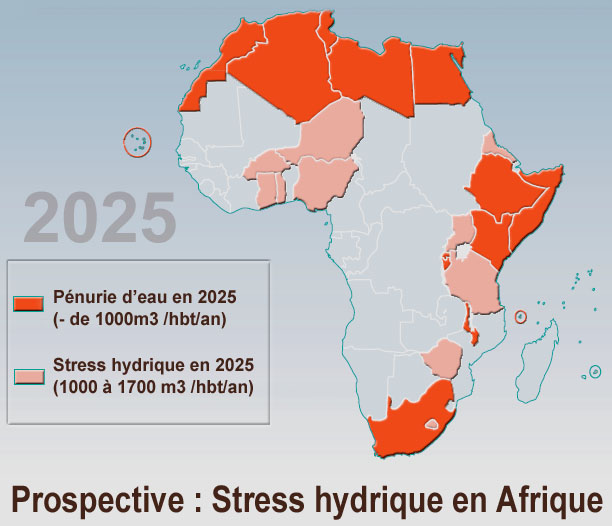
Estimate for 2025: 25 African countries are expected to suffer from water shortage or water stress.

The main causes of water scarcity in Africa are physical and economic water scarcity, rapid population growth, and the effects of climate change on the water cycle. Water scarcity is the lack of fresh water resources to meet the standard water demand. The rainfall in sub-Saharan Africa is highly seasonal and unevenly distributed, leading to frequent floods and droughts.

The Food and Agriculture Organization of the United Nations reported in 2012 that growing water scarcity is now one of the leading challenges for sustainable development. This is because an increasing number of river basins have reached conditions of water scarcity. The reasons for this are the combined demands of agriculture and other sectors. Water scarcity in Africa has several impacts. They range from health, particularly affecting women and children, to education, agricultural productivity and sustainable development. It can also lead to more water conflicts.

==== West Africa and North Africa ====
Water scarcity in Yemen (see: Water supply and sanitation in Yemen) is a growing problem. Population growth and climate change are among the causes. Others are poor water management, shifts in rainfall, water infrastructure deterioration, poor governance, and other anthropogenic effects. As of 2011, water scarcity is having political, economic and social impacts in Yemen. As of 2015, Yemen is one of the countries suffering most from water scarcity. Most people in Yemen experience water scarcity for at least one month a year.

In Nigeria, some reports have suggested that increase in extreme heat, drought and the shrinking of Lake Chad is causing water shortage and environmental migration. This is forcing thousands to migrate to neighboring Chad and towns.

=== Asia ===
A major report in 2019 by more than 200 researchers, found that the Himalayan glaciers could lose 66 percent of their ice by 2100. These glaciers are the sources of Asia's biggest rivers – Ganges, Indus, Brahmaputra, Yangtze, Mekong, Salween and Yellow. Approximately 2.4 billion people live in the drainage basin of the Himalayan rivers. India, China, Pakistan, Bangladesh, Nepal and Myanmar could experience floods followed by droughts in coming decades. In India alone, the Ganges provides water for drinking and farming for more than 500 million people.

Even with the overpumping of its aquifers, China is developing a grain deficit. When this happens, it will almost certainly drive grain prices upward. Most of the 3 billion people projected to be added worldwide by mid-century will be born in countries already experiencing water shortages. Unless population growth can be slowed quickly, it is feared that there may not be a practical non-violent or humane solution to the emerging world water shortage.

It is highly likely that climate change in Turkey will cause its southern river basins to be water scarce before 2070, and increasing drought in Turkey.

=== America ===
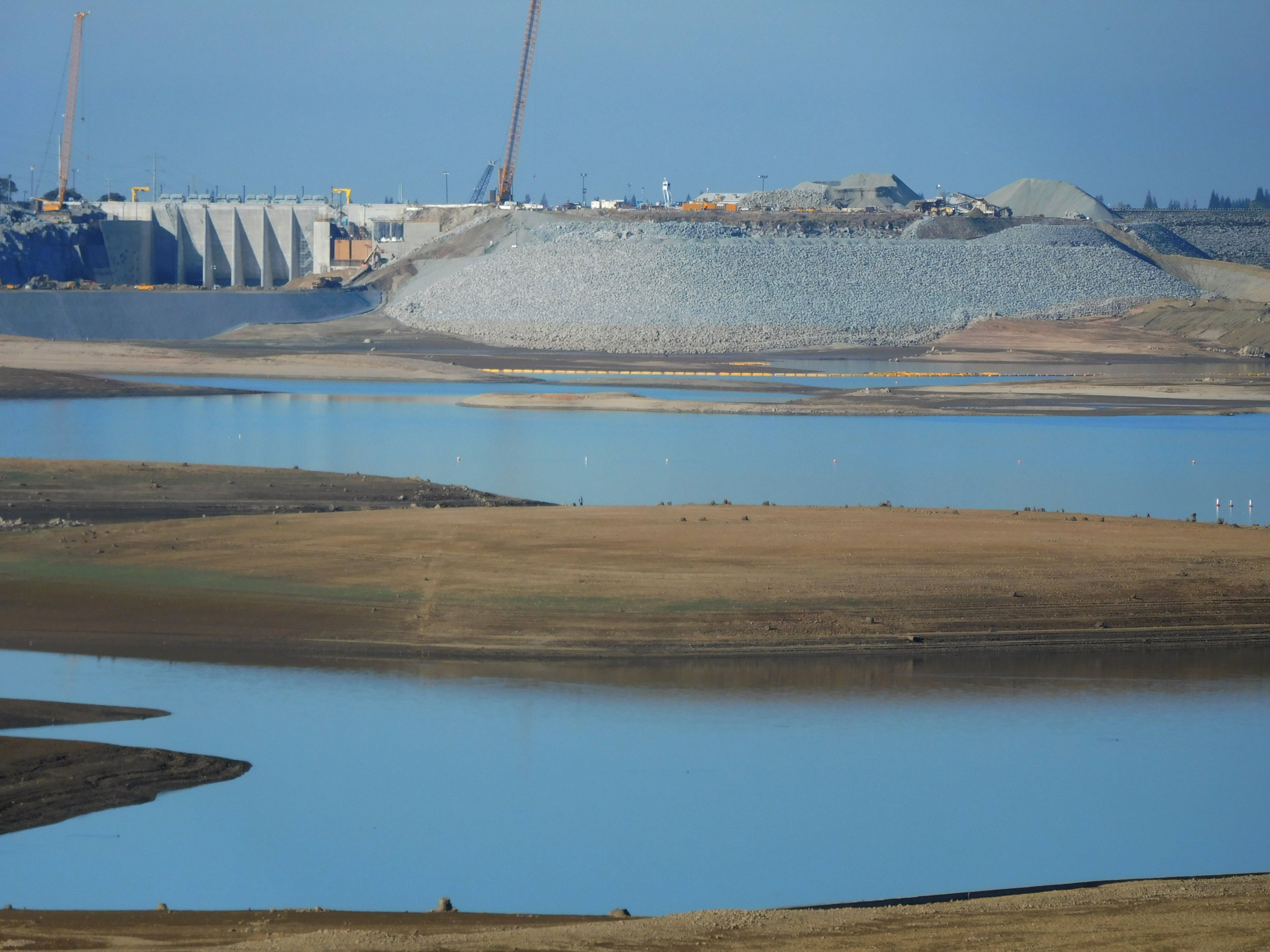
Folsom Lake reservoir during the drought in California in 2015

In the Rio Grande Valley, intensive agribusiness has made water scarcity worse. It has sparked jurisdictional disputes regarding water rights on both sides of the Mexico–United States border. Scholars such as Mexico's Armand Peschard-Sverdrup have argued that this tension has created the need for new strategic transnational water management. Some have likened the disputes to a war over diminishing natural resources.

The west coast of North America, which gets much of its water from glaciers in mountain ranges such as the Rocky Mountains and Sierra Nevada, is also vulnerable.

=== Australia ===
By far the largest part of Australia is desert or semi-arid lands commonly known as the outback. Water restrictions are in place in many regions and cities of Australia in response to chronic shortages resulting from drought. Environmentalist Tim Flannery predicted that Perth in Western Australia could become the world's first ghost metropolis. This would mean it was an abandoned city with no more water to sustain its population, said Flannery, who was Australian of the year 2007. In 2010, Perth suffered its second-driest winter on record and the water corporation tightened water restrictions for spring.

Some countries have already proven that decoupling water use from economic growth is possible. For example, in Australia, water consumption declined by 40% between 2001 and 2009 while the economy grew by more than 30%.

=== By country ===
Water scarcity or water crisis in particular countries:

== Society and culture ==
=== Global goals ===
Freshwater withdrawals as a share of internal resources in 2014. Water stress is defined by the following categories: <10% is low stress; 10-20% is low-to-medium; 20-40% medium-to-high; 40-80% high; >80% extremely high.

Sustainable Development Goal 6 aims for clean water and sanitation for all. It is one of 17 Sustainable Development Goals established by the United Nations General Assembly in 2015. The fourth target of SDG 6 refers to water scarcity. It states: "By 2030, substantially increase water-use efficiency across all sectors and ensure sustainable withdrawals and supply of freshwater to address water scarcity and substantially reduce the number of people suffering from water scarcity".

== See also ==
- Peak water – Concept on the quality and availability of freshwater resources
- Water conservation – Policies for sustainable development of water use
- Water footprint – Extent of water use in relation to consumption by people
- Water issues in developing countries – Water issues and problems in developing countries are diverse and serious
- Water security – Goal of water management to harness water-related opportunities and manage risks
- Outline of water – Overview of and topical guide to water
