= Kaveh Madani =

Iranian environmental scientist (born 1981)

- کاوه مدنی
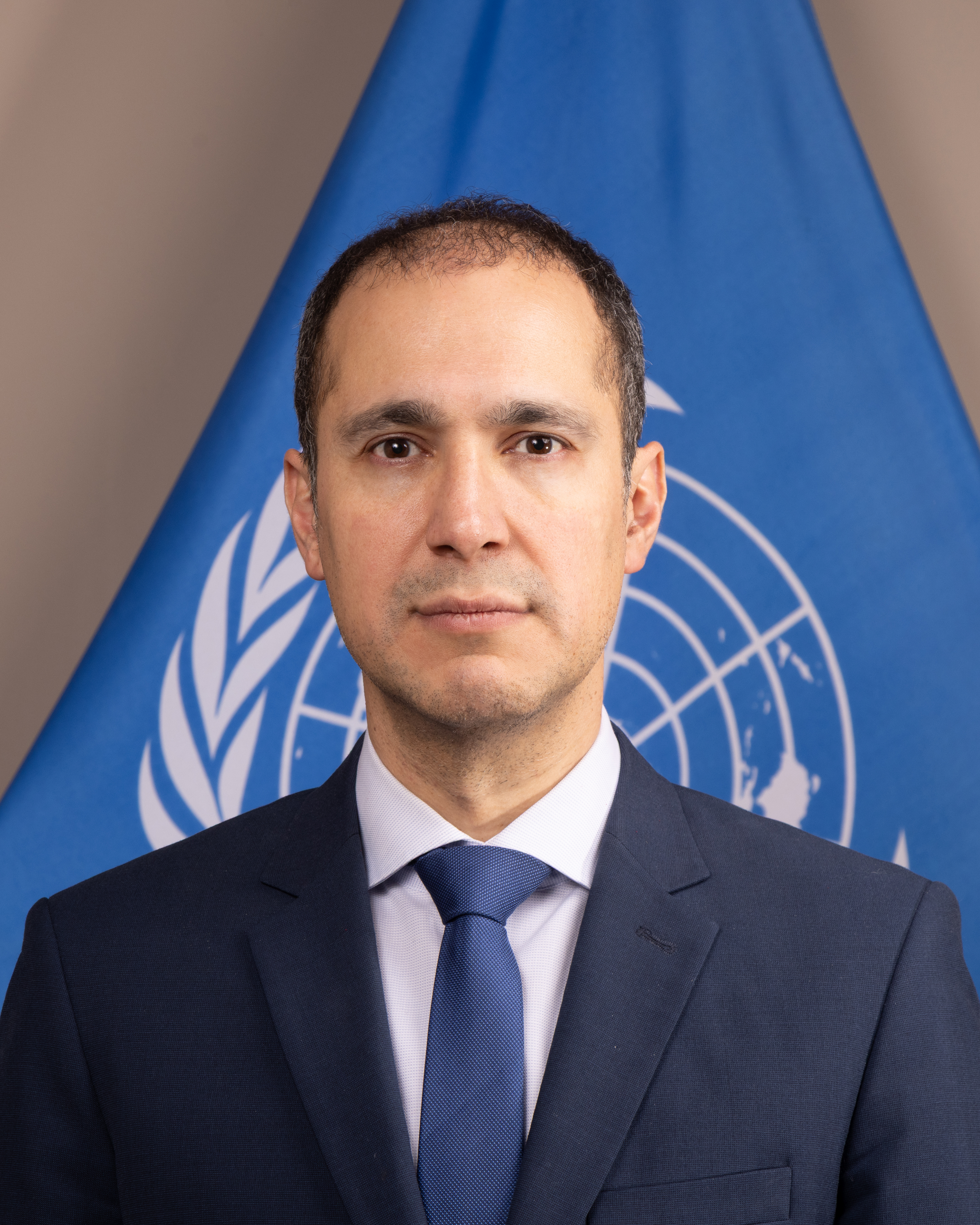
- Kaveh Madani
- Born: 1981 (age 44–45); Tehran, Iran
- Citizenship: Iran
- Education: University of California, Davis; Lund University; University of Tabriz
- Known for: Fundamental contributions to integrating game theory and decision analysis into water management models; Development and formalizing the water bankruptcy concept; Environmental activism and impacting water policy in Iran
- Awards: New Face of Civil Engineering (2012); Arne Richter Award for Outstanding Young Scientists (2016); Walter L. Huber Civil Engineering Research Prize (2017); Hydrologic Sciences Early Career Award (2019); Ambassador Award (2020); Stockholm Water Prize (2026)
- Scientific career
- Workplaces: United Nations University; City College of New York; Yale University; Iran's Department of Environment; Imperial College London; University of Central Florida
- Thesis: Climate Change Effects on High-Elevation Hydropower System in California (2009)
- Doctoral advisor: Jay R. Lund
- Notable students: Ali Salajegheh
- Website: KavehMadani.com; @KavehMadani

Kaveh Madani (Persian: کاوه مدنی; born 1981) is an Iranian scientist and Director of the Institute for Water, Environment and Health of the United Nations University, based in Richmond Hill, Ontario, Canada. He was formerly an Iranian government official in the Department of Environment, which included serving as Deputy Vice President of Iran from 2017 to early 2018. He is also a research professor at the City College of New York. He previously served as the deputy head of Iran's Department of Environment, but left in April 2018 after a crackdown by hardliners against environmental activists. He served as the vice president of the United Nations Environmental Assembly Bureau from 2017 to 2018, and held academic positions at Yale University and Imperial College London.

In the academic world, Madani is known for his work on integrating game theory and decision analysis into water resources management models, and for developing the first formal definition of the "Water Bankruptcy" concept. He is the author of the "Global Water Bankruptcy Report" and has won many awards, including the Stockholm Water Prize. His research and outreach activities influenced water policy in Iran, and he has played a major role in raising public awareness about Iran's water and environmental problems.

== Early life and education ==
Kaveh Madani was born in 1981 in Tehran, Iran, to parents working in the water sector.

He went to school in Tehran, and received his BSc in Civil Engineering from the University of Tabriz in Tabriz, northwestern Iran, in 2003. He travelled abroad for further study, earning has an MSc in Water Resources from Lund University in Lund, Sweden; and a PhD in civil and environmental engineering from the University of California, Davis in California, US.

He undertook post-doctoral studies in Environmental Policy and Economics at the Water Science and Policy Center and the Department of Environmental Sciences of the University of California, Riverside.

== Academic career (2010–present) ==
From around 2010 Madani was assistant professor of civil, environmental, and construction engineering, and an Alex Alexander Fellow at the University of Central Florida, where he was the founding director of the Hydro-Environmental & Energy Systems Analysis (HEESA) Research Group.

In 2013, he joined the Centre for Environmental Policy of Imperial College London, where he worked at Imperial College as a lecturer (assistant professor) in environmental management (2013–2015), senior lecturer (associate professor) in environmental management (2015–2016), and reader in systems analysis and policy (2016–2017). There, he taught game theory as applied to water management problems. During his time there, he co-authored a paper in 2016 that blamed the Iranian Government for failures in water policy in adapting to climate change, causing desertification and increasing dust storms.

He then returned to Iran at the invitation of the government, to serve as the Deputy Vice President of Iran and the Deputy Head of the Department of Environment. He served as the Centre for Environmental Policy's Director of Alumni from 2014 to 2017. He continued to be associated with Imperial College as a visiting reader (2017–2018) in his absence. After leaving Iran, he was officially listed as a visiting professor at the college, but actually went into hiding, with the help of old friends. From Turkiye he travelled through Europe to North America, where he spent about eight months moving between the United States and Toronto, where his wife had resided before their marriage. He made some public appearances at conferences and did interviews during this period.

In January 2020, Madani was appointed visiting professor at Yale University's MacMillan Center for International and Area Studies, and he spent time in Toronto in between spells at the New Haven campus. His rate of publishing slowed down, (Note: As of November 2020, he had more than 300 publications.) partly because he was not interested in highly theoretical work, but wanted to influence policies.

He joined the United Nations University as the Director of the Nexus Program at UNU-FLROES in 2021. Since 1 February 2023 and as of March 2026 he is the director of the United Nations University Institute for Water, Environment and Health (UNU-INWEH),

Since 2021 and as of March 2026 he is also a research professor at the City University of New York's Remote Sensing Earth Systems (CUNY-CREST) Institute at the City College of New York.

Madani is known for his work on integrating game theory and decision analysis into water resources management models, and is credited with coining the term "water bankruptcy". He is the author of the "Global Water Bankruptcy Report" (published January 2026), which declared that the planet had entered the "era of Global Water Bankruptcy", with many river basins and aquifers worldwide having lost their ability to restore their historical conditions.

He has held research and teaching positions at Stockholm University, Cornell University, UC Irvine, K. N. Toosi University of Technology (Iran), and Dalian University of Technology (China), and his alma maters Lund University, UC Davis, and UC Riverside, and has also advised many graduate students and post-doctoral scholars.

== Political career (2017–2018) ==
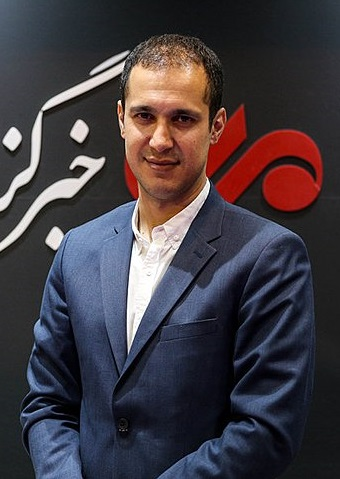
Madani, 2017

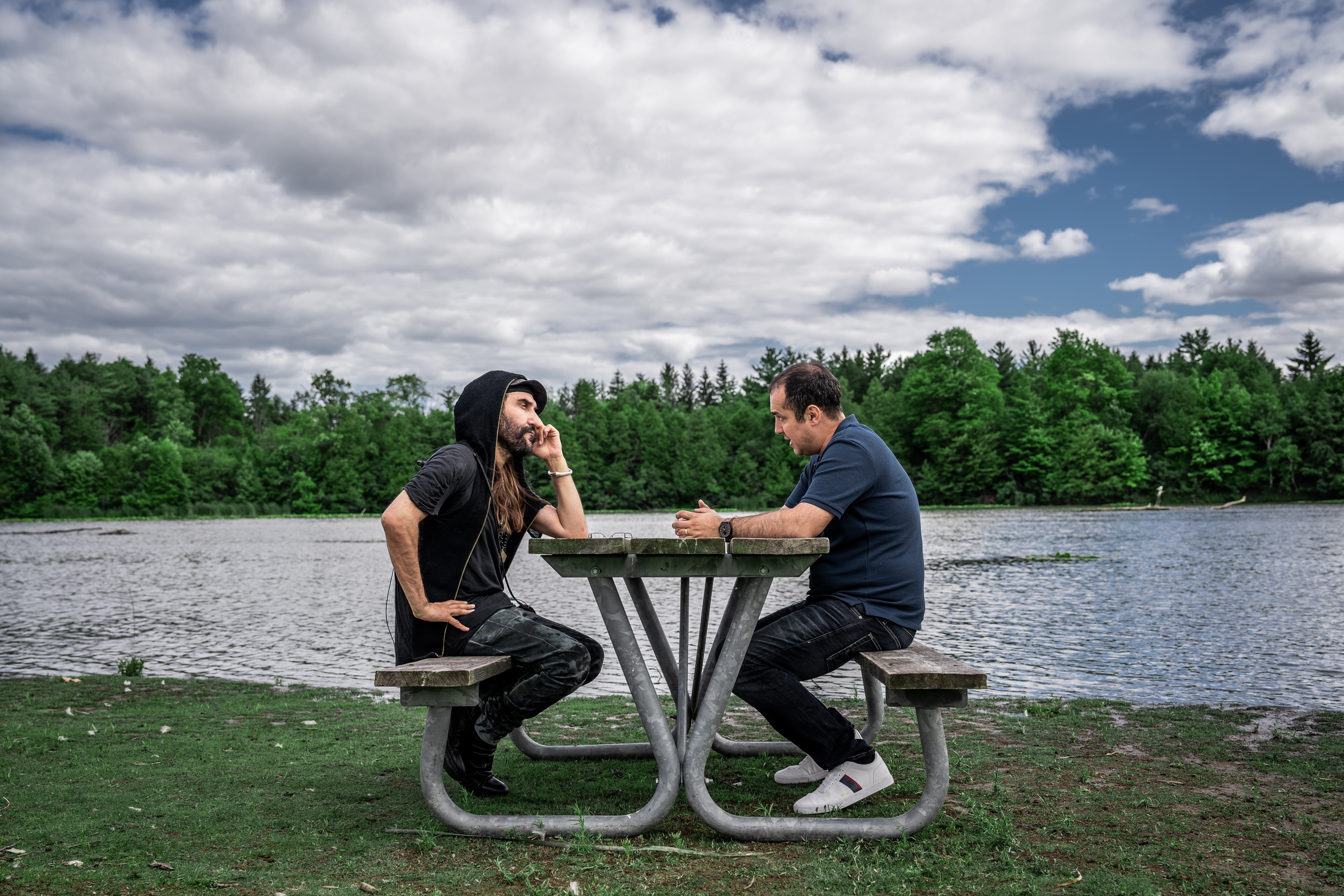
Behzad Bolour Conversation with Kaveh Madani

Madani was appointed by Issa Kalantari as the Deputy for International Affairs, Innovation and Socio-cultural Engagement of Iran's Department of Environment in 2017. When he first arrived back in Iran, he was detained and interrogated by Islamic Revolutionary Guard Corps (IRGC) officers for several hours about his time abroad, and they confiscated his phone and computer. From 2017 to 2018, he served as the Deputy Vice President of Iran in his position as the Deputy Head of Iran's Department of Environment and the Chief of Iran's Department of Environment's International Affairs and Conventions Center.

In Iran, he served as the chair of the National Committee on International Climate Change Negotiations, vice president of the National Committee of Sustainable Development, member of the Supreme Council of Iran's House of Farmers, Member of Iran's Supreme Water Council, and Member of the Iran-Afghanistan Negotiations Workgroup on Water. He was Iran's front environmental diplomat during his tenure in Iran. Madani led Iran's delegation at the 23rd United Nations Climate Change Conference (COP23) in Bonn, Germany, in November 2017, and the following month was the Iranian representative at the anniversary of the 2015 Paris Agreement on Climate Change in Paris, where many countries were represented by their leaders. He also attended the 3rd Session of the United Nations Environment Assembly (UNEA-3).

During this time, he was critical of the government's past water policies, in particular its building of multiple dams, and cloud seeding. Such policies benefited the Islamic Revolutionary Guard Corps (IRGC) through its industrial arm. He was outspoken, and criticised officials.

He was interrogated many times during his tenure in Iran and was arrested by the IRGC in February 2018. In April 2018, he resigned from his political post and revealed that he was kept under surveillance by the Iranian intelligence services and hardliners since his return to Iran.

He left Iran and went into exile in April 2018, after the government had arrested dozens of environmental activists earlier that year, and Madani was detained for 72 hours earlier that year, and his friend, Iranian-Canadian environmentalist Kavous Seyed-Emami, had died in custody. Announcing his departure on Twitter, Madani wrote "Yes, the accused fled from a country where virtual bullies push against science, knowledge and expertise and resort to conspiracy theories to find a scapegoat for all the problems because they know well that finding an enemy, spy or someone to blame is much easier than accepting responsibility and complicity in a problem".

== Campaigns and influence in Iran ==
Madani's research and outreach activities have influenced water policy and environmental management in Iran. His activities over the past two decades have played a significant role in raising public awareness about Iran's major water and environmental problems.

By running a national campaign on waste, he tried to raise public awareness about waste and plastic pollution in Iran. He was the initiator of the popular Bi-Zobaleh (No Waste) challenge, a social game that reminded both citizens and decision makers about their responsibilities on waste using the "Let's Start with Ourselves" slogan. Bi-Zobaleh turned into a viral social media game in Iran with many celebrities, top politicians, influential figures, activists and the public from all walks of life joining the challenge from different parts of the country, sharing their solutions and actions on waste reduction in the environment. The move created national sensitivity to the waste issue, which subsequently encouraged many public waste collection events around the country followed by plastic bottled water bans in some city councils, including major cities like Tabriz, Rasht and Isfahan. Among the Iranian public figures and celebrities who attended the Bi-Zobaleh Challenge are Mitra Hajjar, Pejman Jamshidi, Mohammad Javad Zarif, Mohammad-Javad Azari Jahromi, Shahindokht Molaverdi, Reza Sadeghi, Mohammad Reza Aref, Mohammad Bathaei, Issa Kalantari, Reza Yazdani, Tayebeh Siavoshi, Ayatollah Seyyed Mohammad Ali Al-Hashem, Pantea Bahram, and Roya Nonahali.

Known as "Iran's expat eco-warrior", he was considered the "Symbol of Expatriate Return" to Iran during President Rouhani's administration (2013–2021).

== Other activities ==
Madani was the founding director of Water SISWEB (2008–2017). The acronym stands for "Scientific Information Syndication WEBsite", intended as one of a family of SISWEBs, which are "collaborative websites, which provide scientists, researchers, and professionals with free service to know what is new and popular on the web", with each SISWEB dedicated to a different area of science. However, as of 2026, this had not grown beyond the Water SISWEB.

He has published opinion pieces in The Guardian and online journals, and has posted many tweets in Persian, in which he both criticised and defended Iran.

== Recognition, impact, and awards ==
Madani is a Fellow of the American Geophysical Union (AGU) and of EWRI (American Society of Civil Engineers).

He is credited with coining the term "water bankruptcy". During his time in Iran, he was successful in getting plastic bottled water banned in many areas, and a national ban on super deep groundwater mining.

He has received several awards for his research contributions, teaching innovations, and humanitarian activities.

In 2012, the American Society of Civil Engineers (ASCE) introduced him as one of the 10 "New Faces of Civil Engineering" for "work and personal achievements representing the bold and humanitarian future of civil engineering".

He received the Arne Richter Award for Outstanding Young Scientists from the European Geosciences Union (EGU) in 2016 for "fundamental contributions to integrating game theory and decision analysis into water management models"

Madani received the Walter L. Huber prize, which is awarded by the American Society of Civil Engineers for "groundbreaking research in developing methods for the allocation of scarce water resources merging conflict-resolution and game-theoretic concepts for application to complex water resources systems", introducing "novel insight on how to achieve binding, long-term solutions to complex water resources problems", and "outstanding leadership in the application of systems analysis to environmental, water and energy resource problems".

He received the Hydrologic Sciences Early Career Award from the American Geophysical Union (AGU) in 2019 for "fundamental contributions to integrating game theory and decision analysis methods into conventional water resources systems models" and "proven dedication to education, outreach, raising public awareness on environmental and climate issues, and selfless service to the hydrologic sciences community has had major societal impacts."

Madani was awarded the American Geophysical Union 2020 Ambassador Award for his contributions and leadership in research, education and outreach in the Earth and space science, and for "his selfless service and outstanding societal impacts as an ambassador of the hydrologic sciences community in the real world".

In March 2026 Madani was announced as the winner of the Stockholm Water Prize, which is presented by the Stockholm Water Foundation in collaboration with the Royal Swedish Academy of Sciences, and "honours individuals and organisations whose work contributes significantly to the sustainable use and protection of the world's water resources". King Carl XVI Gustaf of Sweden will present Madani with the award during World Water Week in Stockholm in August.

== Personal life ==
Madani is an Iranian citizen and has frequently denied the claims by the Iranian hardliners about having additional citizenships.
