= Water bankruptcy =

Condition caused by overuse of water resources

Water bankruptcy is a condition caused by an overuse of water resource for an extended period to the extent that leads to irreversible ecosystem damages, resulting in systems losing their ability to restore historical ecosystem service baselines. The term has been developed and formally defined in the scientific literature by environmental scientist Kaveh Madani and was adopted by the United Nations system in 2026, with the publication of the "Global Water Bankruptcy" report.

Water bankruptcy is used in water policy and environmental governance discourse to describe a condition in which a water system, such as a river basin, aquifer, lake system, or watershed, has been so overexploited or degraded that it can no longer return to its historical balance under existing climatic, ecological, and institutional conditions. The term has been used to distinguish severe and potentially irreversible human-water systems' failure from more familiar concepts such as water scarcity, water stress, or water crisis.

== Definition ==
Water bankruptcy is defined as:

...the persistent post-crisis condition or the state of failure in a human-water system in which:

1. Long-term average human withdrawals from surface and groundwater—the checking and savings accounts of the system—exceed the system's renewable freshwater inflows and the safe limits of depletion of strategic water reserves and pressure on water-dependent ecosystems; and

2. The resulting depletion and degradation of water-related natural capital cause partially irreversible damages on societally relevant time scales, such that historical levels of water supply and ecosystem function cannot be restored without disproportionate social, economic, or environmental costs.

— Kaveh Madani, "Water Bankruptcy: The Formal Definition". Water Resources Management. 40(2): 78.

=== Related concepts ===
Water bankruptcy is related to, but distinct from, several established terms in water policy and hydrology:

- Water scarcity generally refers to insufficient water availability relative to demand.
- Water stress describes high pressure on water resources.
- Water crisis usually refers to acute or chronic disruption that may still be reversible.

Water bankruptcy, by contrast, refers to a post-crisis condition in which prolonged overuse and ecological damage have made return to historical service baselines impractical or impossible. The concept therefore emphasizes not only shortage, but also systemic insolvency, ecological degradation, and irreversible loss of recoverability.

== Origin and development ==
The concept of water bankruptcy was formally developed by Kaveh Madani, and subsequently promoted by the United Nations University to distinguish chronic and potentially irreversible water-system failure from more familiar concepts such as water scarcity, water stress, and water crisis.. While the earlier use of the term was for describing imbalance, shortage, or disruption in water systems, the concept of water bankruptcy was formulated by Madani to capture a deeper post-crisis condition in which ecological degradation and depletion of water-related natural capital make return to historical conditions no longer feasible on societally relevant time scales.

The term was formally defined in the scientific literature in Madani's 2026 article, Water Bankruptcy: The Formal Definition, published in Water Resources Management. In that article, Madani proposed a framework combining two essential elements: 1) hydrological insolvency, meaning that withdrawals exceed renewable inflows and safe depletion limits, and 2) irreversibility, meaning that resulting damages cannot be reversed without disproportionate economic, social, or environmental cost.

The concept was subsequently advanced in the Global Water Bankruptcy report. The report helped move the term from academic definition into global policy discourse, arguing that many river basins and aquifers around the world had crossed from crisis into a condition of persistent bankruptcy.

== Global Water Bankruptcy Report ==
On 20 January, 2026 the United Nations University Institute for Water, Environment and Health (UNU-INWEH), known as the UN's Think Tank on Water, published a flagship report titled Global Water Bankruptcy: Living Beyond Our Hydrological Means in the Post-Crisis Era. The report was launched at the noon briefing of the spokesperson of the UN Secretary-General at the Headquarters of the United Nations in New York City. The report officially declared that as of 2026, the world has entered the 'Global Water Bankruptcy' era, characterized by the growing number of river basins and aquifers that are unable to return to historical hydrological norms because of long-term overuse, ecosystem degradation, and changing climatic conditions. Kaveh Madani is credited as the report's author.

The report described global water bankruptcy as a post-crisis reality in which many human-water systems are no longer merely stressed, but structurally impaired. It argued that the term was needed to reflect the increasing number of systems that had lost the ability to "bounce back" to historical normal conditions.

== See also ==
- Peak water
- Water resource management
