= Puerto Rico water crisis =

Puerto Rico is experiencing a water crisis.

== History ==
Water infrastructure has had a "lack of maintenance and upkeeping", with around 60% of water "lost due to leaks and other infrastructural issues".

On July 31, 2026, Governor Jenniffer González-Colón declared a state of emergency.

On August 7, 2026, water rationing began officially as the Carraízo reservoir depleted during the ongoing drought.

== See also ==
- Climate change in Puerto Rico
- Puerto Rico Aqueduct and Sewer Authority
