= United Nations University Institute for Water, Environment and Health =

United Nations agency

- Abbreviation: UNU-INWEH
- Formation: 1996
- Legal status: Active
- Headquarters: Richmond Hill, Ontario
- Head: Kaveh Madani
- Parent organization: United Nations University
- Website: https://unu.edu/inweh

The United Nations University Institute for Water, Environment and Health (UNU-INWEH) is a United Nations (UN) agency responsible addressing critical global security and development challenges at the intersection of water, environment, and health. The organization is a research and training institute of the United Nations University (UNU), the academic arm of the United Nations, and acts as the UN's "Think Tank on Water". UNU-INWEH was created in 1996 in response to an emerging concern about the growing global water crisis and its harmful impact on human and environmental health and sustainable development.

UNU-INWEH has made major contributions to advancing global policy-relevant water research. UNU-INWEH represents the UNU at UN-Water — an inter-agency coordination mechanism of the United Nations for freshwater and sanitation-related issues. The institute leads UN-Water efforts to support the UN-wide International Decade for Action on “Water for Sustainable Development” (2018–2028).

UNU-INWEH is based in Richmond Hill, Ontario, and is hosted by the City of Richmond Hill. In August 2022, Kaveh Madani, a world-renowned environmental scientist and former Vice President of the United Nations Environment Assembly Bureau, was appointed as the director of UNU-INWEH.

== Structure ==
UNU-INWEH is one of the 13 institutions that function as the academic arm of the United Nations and shape the United Nations University system, headquartered in Tokyo. As a UNU institute, UNU-INWEH is managed by the institute's Director, who reports to the UNU Rector, an Under-Secretary-General of the UN. The organization is governed by the UNU Council, reporting annually to the UN General Assembly, the UN Economic and Social Council, and the executive board of UNESCO. The guidelines for the management of the institute are set by an International Advisory Council of environmental scientists and policy experts, appointed by the UNU Rector in consultation with the UNU Council and the Director of UNU-INWEH. The institute's operations and funding are mainly supported through agreements with the Government of Canada and its facilities are supported by a partnership with the City of Richmond Hill, Ontario. In January 2023, Alexandra Bugailiskis, former Canadian ambassador and Permanent Representative to the Food and Agriculture Organization, the World Food Programme, and the International Fund for Agricultural Development, was appointed as the Chair of UNU-INWEH's International Advisory Council.

== Mission ==
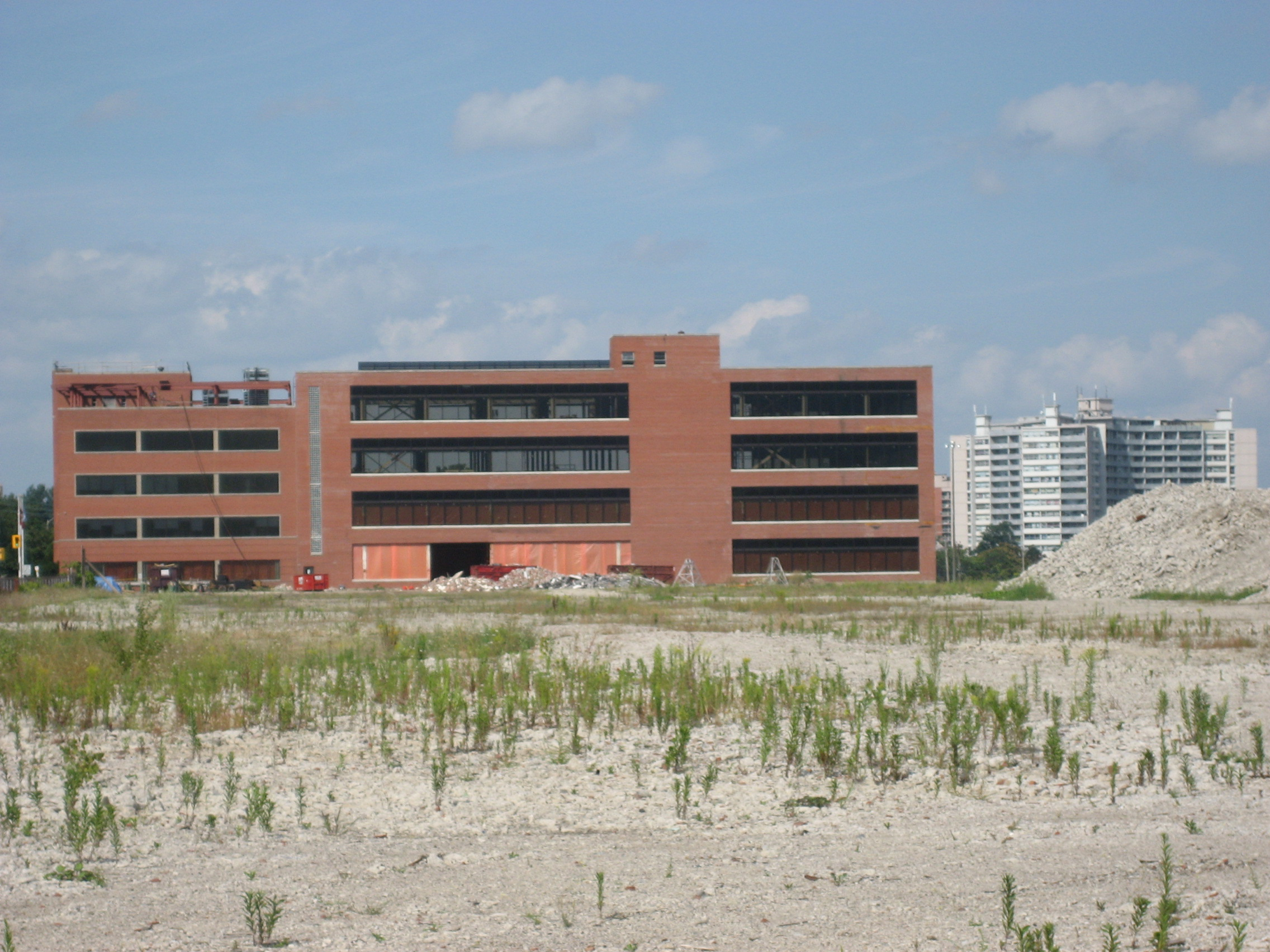
McMaster Innovation Park (MIP) which was hosting UNU-INWEH until early 2024

The UNU-INWEH's mission is to address the pressing water, environmental and health issues that affect the United Nations directly through its member states. The primary function of the institute is to help resolve international water challenges through research and education on issues such as management of water resources, promotion of ecosystem health and improving human wellbeing through safe water access.

== Capacity development ==
The organization has a significant focus on promoting capacity development as both a research and an educational institute.

=== Water Without Borders ===
The Water Without Borders program is a graduate certificate program administered as a collaboration between the UNU-INWEH and McMaster University. It was initially developed in 2010 with the aim of promoting academic and professional development at the graduate level for students with an interest in global water issues. The course runs over a full academic year and includes course components such as course-based learning, a final paper on a water-related topic relevant to the UNU-INWEH as well as an international field trip to learn about global water challenges within a real-world context.

=== Internships ===
The UNU-INWEH also runs an in-house internship program for graduate students that have completed or are close to completing their formal degree program. Internships typically range from 3–6 months and have a focus on producing either a research paper, tool or dataset that contributes to the organization's broader role and mission. In 2018, five interns from three different countries were hosted through this program.

=== Online learning ===
The Water Learning Centre (WLC) is an online program that offers three courses: Integrated Water Resources Management, Mangroves Management and Global Water Security. The aim the WLC is to engage international trainees from with water management issues at a cohesive interface. The average time commitment is 3 hours/week. The course is structured on UN-Water's framework for global water issues and runs across 25 total hours of instructional time.
