= List of climate scientists =

Climate scientists study the climate system, including the statistics of the Earth's temperature (top) and precipitation (bottom).

This list of climate scientists contains famous or otherwise notable persons who have contributed to the study of climate science. The list is compiled manually, so will not be complete, up to date, or comprehensive. The list includes scientists from several specialities or disciplines.

== A ==
- Waleed Abdalati, American, director of Cooperative Institute for Research in Environmental Studies, former chief scientist of NASA
- Nerilie Abram (1977–), Australian paleoclimatologist, at Australian National University
- Myles Allen, head of the Climate Dynamics group at University of Oxford's Atmospheric, Oceanic and Planetary Physics Department. Lead author, IPCC Third Assessment Report. Review editor, Fourth Assessment Report.
- Richard Alley (1957–), Penn State College of Earth and Mineral Science, American, Earth's cryosphere and global climate change.
- Kevin Anderson, Director of the Tyndall Centre for Climate Change Research and is an adviser to the British Government on climate change.
- James Annan, British climatologist with Blue Skies Research, UK
- Julie Arblaster, Australian climatologist at The Centre for Australian Weather and Climate Research in CSIRO
- David Archer, American professor of oceanography at University of Chicago
- Svante Arrhenius (1859–1927), Swedish, greenhouse effect

== B ==
- Sallie Baliunas, American, astrophysicist, solar variation
- Elizabeth A. Barnes, American climate scientist working on earth science statistics
- Eric J. Barron (1944–), American geophysicist, President of Pennsylvania State University
- Roger G. Barry, (1935–2018), British-American, polar climatologist, first director of the National Snow and Ice Data Center
- Robin Bell, American, polar geophysicist, President-elect of the American Geophysical Union
- Martin Beniston (1953–), Swiss climate scientist.
- Lennart Bengtsson (1935–), Swedish meteorologist and climate scientist
- André Berger, (1942–), Belgian, modeling climatic changes at the geological and at the century time scales
- Richard A. Betts, Head of the Climate Impacts strategic area at the Met Office Hadley Centre
- John W. Birks, American atmospheric chemist and co-developer of the nuclear winter theory
- Jacob Bjerknes (1897–1975), Norwegian-American meteorologist
- Vilhelm Bjerknes (1862–1951), Norwegian, forecasting, numerical models
- Bert Bolin (1925–2007), Swedish meteorologist, first chair of the IPCC
- Gerard C. Bond (1940–2005), American geologist and paleoclimate researcher
- Jason Box, American professor of glaciology at Ohio State University
- Raymond S. Bradley, American, historical temperatures, paleoclimatology, and climate variability.
- Keith Briffa (1952–2017), United Kingdom, dendrochronology, temperature history.
- Wallace Smith Broecker (1931–2019), American, Pleistocene geochronology, radiocarbon dating, and chemical oceanography
- Harold E. Brooks (1959–), American meteorologist, severe convective storm and tornado climatology as well as conducive atmospheric environments
- Keith Browning, British meteorologist; mesoscale meteorology, sparkles

== C ==
- Robert Cahalan, American, climate physics, energy balance, radiative transfer, remote sensing, solar radiation
- Ken Caldeira, American, climate engineering, ocean acidification, atmospheric chemistry
- Guy Stewart Callendar (February 1898-October 1964), English steam engineer and inventor who proposed what eventually became known as the Callendar effect, the theory that linked rising carbon dioxide concentrations in the atmosphere to global temperature
- Mark Cane, American, modeling and prediction of the El Niño-Southern Oscillation
- Anny Cazenave, French oceanographer specializing in satellite altimetry
- Robert D. Cess (1933–2022), American atmospheric scientist, Professor at Stony Brook University, specializing in Earth's radiation budget.
- Jule G. Charney (1917–1981), American meteorologist, pioneer in numerical weather modeling
- John Christy, director of the Earth System Science Center at The University of Alabama in Huntsville. Best known (with Roy Spencer) for developing the first version of the satellite temperature record.
- John A. Church (1951–), Australian oceanographer, chair of the World Climate Research Programme
- Ralph J. Cicerone (1943–2016), American atmospheric chemist, President of U.S. National Academy of Sciences
- Danielle Claar, American marine scientist studying effect of climate on coral symbionts and parasites
- Allison Crimmins, American, head of the National Climate Assessment
- Harmon Craig (1926–2003), pioneering American geochemist
- Paul J. Crutzen (1933–2021), Dutch, stratospheric and tropospheric chemistry, and their role in the biogeochemical cycles and climate
- Heidi Cullen, American meteorologist, chief scientist for Climate Central
- Balfour Currie OC (1902–1981), Canadian climatologist at University of Saskatchewan
- Judith Curry American climatologist and former chair of the School of Earth and Atmospheric Sciences at the Georgia Institute of Technology

== D ==
- Willi Dansgaard (1922–2011), Danish climatologist
- Scott Denning, American atmospheric scientist and professor at Colorado State University
- Andrew Dessler, American atmospheric scientist and professor at Texas A&M University
- P. C. S. Devara, Indian climatologist and professor at Amity University, Gurgaon
- Robert E. Dickinson, American climatologist, professor at University of Texas at Austin
- Mark Dyurgerov (died 2009), Russian-American glaciologist

== E ==
- Sylvia Earle (1935–), American marine biologist
- Don Easterbrook (1935–), American, professor emeritus of Geology at Western Washington University
- Tamsin Edwards, British climate scientist at King's College London
- Arnt Eliassen, dynamic meteorologist
- Kerry Emanuel (1955–), American, atmospheric dynamics specializing in hurricanes
- Matthew England (1966–), Australian, physical oceanographer and climate dynamicist
- Ian G. Enting, Australian mathematical physicist at University of Melbourne

== F ==
- Joe Farman, British, ozone hole above Antarctica
- Christopher Field, American climate scientist with the Carnegie Institution for Science
- Eunice Newton Foote (1819–1888), American scientist, first to demonstrate that increased atmospheric levels of CO_{2} would result in heating of the atmosphere
- Piers Forster, British professor of Physical Climate Change at University of Leeds
- Joseph Fourier (1768–1830), French, greenhouse effect
- Jennifer Francis, climate change in the Arctic
- Benjamin Franklin (1706–1790), first mapped the course of the Gulf Stream for use in sending mail from the United States to Europe
- Chris Freeman, Welsh professor of biogeochemistry
- Eigil Friis-Christensen (1944–2018), Danish geophysicist
- Inez Fung, American, climate modeling, biogeochemical cycles, and climate change
- Yevgraf Yevgrafovich Fyodorov (1880–1965), Russian climatologist

== G ==
- Francis Galton (1822–1911), coined the term anticyclone
- Filippo Giorgi (1959–), Italian atmospheric physicist, International Centre for Theoretical Physics
- Peter Gleick (1956–), American, hydroclimatologist, hydrologic impacts of climate change, snowfall/snowmelt responses, water adaptation strategies, consequences of sea level rise
- Kenneth M. Golden, American applied mathematician, percolation theory and diffusion process models of sea ice, professor at University of Utah
- Natalya Gomez, climate-ice sheet-solid earth modeler, Canadian, professor at McGill University
- Jonathan M. Gregory, climate modeler, British, professor at University of Reading
- Jean Grove (1927–2001), British, glaciologist; the Little Ice Age

== H ==
- Joanna Haigh, (1954–), British, co-director of Grantham Institute at Imperial College London, solar variability
- Edmund Halley, published a map of the trade winds in 1686 after a voyage to the southern hemisphere
- Gordon Hamilton, (1966–2016), Scottish, Associate Research Professor, Climatology Group, of the University of Maine
- James E. Hansen (1941–), American, planetary atmospheres, remote sensing, numerical models, and global warming
- Kenneth Hare OC FRSC (1919–2002), Canadian climatologist
- Klaus Hasselmann, German oceanographer and climate modeller, founding director of the Max Planck Institute for Meteorology
- Ed Hawkins MBE, British climate scientist at University of Reading, and designer of data visualization graphics
- Katharine Hayhoe, Canadian, Atmospheric science, global climate models.
- Gabriele C. Hegerl (1963–), Professor of Climate System Science at the University of Edinburgh School of GeoSciences.
- Isaac Held, German-American atmospheric physicist, researcher at GFDL
- Ann Henderson-Sellers (1952–), Australian, climate change risk evaluation
- Ellie Highwood, Professor of Climate Physics at the University of Reading
- David A. Hodell, (1958–), British paleoclimatologist, professor at Cambridge University
- Ove Hoegh-Guldberg, Australian oceanographer at University of Queensland
- Greg Holland, Australian meteorology researcher at NCAR
- Brian Hoskins, British climatologist and professor at University of Reading
- John T. Houghton (1931–2020), British, atmospheric physics, remote sensing
- Malcolm K. Hughes, British meso-climatologist, professor at University of Arizona
- Mike Hulme (1960–), British, climate impacts, climate modelling, climate and culture.
- Thomas Sterry Hunt (1826–1892), American, first scientist to connect carbon dioxide to climate change

== I ==
- Sherwood Idso (1942–), American, former research physicist with US Department of Agriculture

== J ==
- Eystein Jansen (1953–), Norwegian professor of paleoceanography at University of Bergen and former director of Bjerknes Centre for Climate Research
- Phil Jones (1952–), British, instrumental climate change, palaeoclimatology, detection of climate change
- Jean Jouzel, French glaciologist and climatologist specializing in major climatic shifts

== K ==
- Peter Kalmus, American data scientist at NASA's Jet Propulsion Laboratory and Associate Project Scientist at University of California, Los Angeles’ Joint Institute for Regional Earth System Science & Engineering
- Daniel Kammen, American professor of Energy at University of California, Berkeley
- Thomas R. Karl (1951–), American, climate extremes and variability
- David Karoly, Australian professor of meteorology at University of Melbourne
- Charles David Keeling (1928–2005), American, atmospheric carbon dioxide measurements, Keeling Curve
- Ralph Keeling (1959–), American professor of Atmospheric Chemistry at Scripps Institution of Oceanography
- David W. Keith, Canadian, Geoengineering and CO_{2} capture and storage research, University Professor at SEAS and Harvard Kennedy School
- Wilfrid George Kendrew, (1884–1962), Scottish climatologist and meteorologist
- Gretchen Keppel-Aleks, American climate scientist
- Joseph B. Klemp, American atmospheric scientist at NCAR
- Thomas Knutson, American climate modeller, researcher at GFDL
- Reto Knutti, Swiss climate scientist, professor at ETH Zurich
- Roxy Mathew Koll, Indian climate scientist at the Indian Institute of Tropical Meteorology (IITM)
- Kirill Y. Kondratyev (1920–2006), Russian atmospheric physicist
- Bronwen Konecky, paleoclimatologist and climatologist
- Wladimir Köppen, Russian/German meteorologist and climatologist, Köppen climate classification
- Pancheti Koteswaram, Indian meteorologist and former vice-president of the World Meteorological Organization
- Shen Kuo (1031–1095), Chinese scientist who inferred that climates naturally shifted over an enormous span of time
- M. Levent Kurnaz, Turkish climate scientist at Boğaziçi University, director of the Center for Climate Change and Policy Studies (iklimBU)
- John E. Kutzbach (1937–2021), American climatologist at University of Wisconsin–Madison

== L ==
- Dmitry Lachinov (1842–1902), Russian climatologist and engineer
- Hubert Lamb (1913–1997), British climatologist, founder of the Climatic Research Unit at University of East Anglia
- Kurt Lambeck, Australian, cryosphere-hydrosphere-lithosphere interactions, and sea level rise and its impact on human populations
- Helmut Landsberg (1906–1985), German-American, fostered the use of statistical analysis in climatology, which led to its evolution into a physical science
- Christopher Landsea (1965–), American meteorologist, Science and Operations Officer at the National Hurricane Center
- Mojib Latif (1954–), German, meteorology and oceanography, climate modelling
- Corinne Le Quéré, France/Canadian/UK, Royal Society research professor, University of East Anglia
- Anders Levermann, German professor of climate dynamics at University of Potsdam
- Richard Lindzen (1940–), American, dynamic meteorology, especially planetary waves
- Diana Liverman (1954–), American/British, climate impacts, vulnerability and policy
- Michael Lockwood, British professor of physics at Reading University
- Michael S. Longuet-Higgins FRS (Oceanographer) (1925–2016), British, mathematician and oceanographer DAMTP at Cambridge University and Scripps Institution UCSD, ocean waves and fluid dynamics
- Edward Norton Lorenz (1917–2008), American, discovery of the strange attractor notion and coined the term butterfly effect
- Claude Lorius, French glaciologist, director emeritus of CNRS
- James Lovelock (1919–2022), British, Gaia hypothesis and biotic feedbacks.
- Amanda Lynch, Australian, Professor of Earth, Environmental and Planetary Sciences at Brown University and the founding director of the Institute at Brown for Environment and Society.
- Peter Lynch, Irish meteorologist and mathematician

== M ==
- Michael MacCracken (1942–), American, chief scientist at the Climate Institute in Washington, DC
- Gordon J. F. MacDonald (1929–2002), American physicist who developed one of the first computational models of climate change, and was an early advocate for governmental action
- Jerry D. Mahlman (1940–2012), American meteorologist and climatologist and a pioneer in the use of computational models of the atmosphere to examine the interactions between atmospheric chemistry and physics
- László Makra (1952–), Hungarian climatologist. Full professor. His main research area is pollen climatology and, within this, analysis of climatological relationships of ragweed pollen, as well as relationship between ragweed pollen concentration and respiratory diseases.
- Syukuro Manabe (1931–), American, professor Princeton University, pioneered the use of computers to simulate global climate change and natural climate variations
- Gordon Manley (1902–1980), English, Central England temperature (CET) series
- Michael E. Mann (1965–), American, professor of meteorology and director, Earth System Science Center, Penn State U.
- David Marshall, British physical oceanographer at the University of Oxford.
- Valerie Masson-Delmotte, French climate scientist with a focus on paleoclimatology at the Climate and Environment Sciences Laboratory (LSCE)
- Gordon McBean, Canadian, boundary layer research, hydrometeorology and environmental impact research, and weather forecasting
- James J. McCarthy, American professor of Biological Oceanography at Harvard University
- Rachel McCarthy(1984-) British Climatologist, joint theorist whose work led to the solving of the 'missing heat' phenomenon. Expert in Disaster Risk and Reduction. European Commission
- Helen McGregor, Australian geologist and climate change researcher, a Fellow with the Research School of Earth Sciences at the Australian National University
- Christopher McKay, American planetary scientist at NASA Ames Research Center
- Marcia McNutt, American geophysicist, president of the National Academy of Sciences
- Linda Mearns, American climate scientist, senior scientist at NCAR
- Carl Mears, American, senior scientist at Remote Sensing Systems
- Gerald A. Meehl (1951–), American climatologist at NCAR
- Katrin Meissner, German and Australian physical oceanographer and climate scientist, director of the Climate Change Research Centre at University of New South Wales
- Sebastian H. Mernild (1972–), Danish glaciologist and hydrologist, former director of the Nansen Environmental Research Center (NERSC), Bergen, Norway and research director of the Climate Change and Glaciology Laboratory (at CECs), Valdivia, Chile. Former Vice President of the International Commission on Snow and Ice Hydrology (under IAHS).
- Milutin Milanković (1879–1958), Serbian, Milankovitch cycles
- John F. B. Mitchell, British, climate modelling and detection and attribution of climate change
- Fritz Möller (1906–1983), German, early modeling of CO_{2} greenhouse effect
- Mario J. Molina (1943–2020), Mexican, atmospheric chemistry and ozone depletion
- Nils-Axel Mörner (1938–2020), Swedish oceanographer and climate scientist
- Richard H. Moss, chairman, Advisory Committee for the Sustained National Climate Assessment
- Antonio Divino Moura, Brazilian meteorologist and formerly a vice-president of the World Meteorological Organization
- Richard A. Muller (1944–), American physicist, head of the Berkeley Earth Surface Temperature project, formerly an outspoken critic of current climate change science
- R. E. Munn FRSC (1919–2013), Canadian climatologist
- Helene Muri (1979–), Norwegian climate scientist

== N ==
- Gerald North (1938–), American atmospheric scientist at Texas A&M and author of the North Report

== O ==
- Hans Oeschger (1927–1998), Swiss palaeoclimatologist and isotope chemist
- Atsumu Ohmura (1942–), Japanese climatologist, professor emeritus at ETH Zurich
- Cliff Ollier (1931–), British-Australian geologist and climate scientist
- Abraham H. Oort, Dutch-American climatologist
- Michael Oppenheimer, American professor of geosciences at Princeton University
- Timothy Osborn, British professor of Climate Science at University of East Anglia
- Friederike Otto (1982–), German climatologist, associate director of the Environmental Change Institute

== P ==
- Tim Palmer CBE FRS (1952–), British mathematical physicist, climate modeler at Oxford University
- Garth Paltridge (1940–), Australian atmospheric physicist
- David E. Parker, British, surface temperature trend
- Fyodor Panayev (1856–1933), Russian climatologist
- Graeme Pearman OA FAAS (1941–), Australian climatologist
- William Richard Peltier (1943–), Canadian, global geodynamic modeling and ice sheet reconstructions; atmospheric and oceanic waves and turbulence
- Jean Robert Petit, French palaeoclimatologist, emeritus director of research at Centre national de la recherche scientifique
- David Phillips OC (1944–), Canadian climatologist and meteorologist
- Roger A. Pielke, Sr. (1946–), American, climate change, environmental vulnerability, numerical modeling, and atmospheric dynamics
- Raymond Pierrehumbert, idealized climate modeling, Faint young sun paradox
- Andrew Pitman (1964–), British, terrestrial processes in global and regional climate modelling, model evaluation and earth systems approaches to understanding climate change
- Gilbert Plass (1920–2004), Canadian, CO_{2} greenhouse effect and AGW
- Henry Pollack, American emeritus professor of geophysics at University of Michigan
- Vicky Pope, British, Head of the Climate Prediction Programme at the Hadley Centre for Climate Prediction and Research

== Q ==
- Detlef Quadfasel, German professor of geophysics at Niels Bohr Institute

== R ==
- Stefan Rahmstorf (1960–), German, the role of ocean currents in climate change
- Veerabhadran Ramanathan, Indian, general circulation models, atmospheric chemistry, and radiative transfer
- Michael Raupach (1950–2015), Australian climatologist, formerly of CSIRO and was director of the Climate Change program at Australian National University
- Maureen Raymo, American paleoclimatologist
- David Reay, Professor of Carbon Management at the University of Edinburgh
- Martine Rebetez (1961–), Swiss climatologist, professor at the University of Neuchâtel and senior scientist at Swiss Federal Institute for Forest, Snow and Landscape Research WSL.
- Roger Revelle (1909–1991), American, global warming and chemical oceanography
- Lewis Fry Richardson (1881–1953), English mathematician and meteorologist
- Eric Rignot, American professor of Earth System Science at University of California, Irvine
- Alan Robock (1941–), American climatologist, professor at Rutgers University
- Johan Rockström (1965-), Swedish climate scientist, director of the Potsdam Institute for Climate Impact Research
- Joeri Rogelj (1980–), Belgian climate scientist and IPCC author
- Joseph J. Romm (1960–2026), American author, blogger, physicist
- Carl-Gustaf Rossby (1898–1957), Swedish-American climatologist
- Frank Sherwood Rowland (1927–2012), American atmospheric chemist at University of California, Irvine
- Cynthia E. Rosenzweig (c. 1958–), American climatologist, pioneered the study of climate change and agriculture
- William Ruddiman, American palaeoclimatologist, Early Anthropogenic Hypothesis
- Steve Running, American global ecologist at University of Montana

== S ==
- Murry Salby, American atmospheric and climate scientist
- Jim Salinger, New Zealand climatologist
- Dork Sahagian, Armenian-American, Lehigh University
- Marie Sanderson (1921–2010), Canadian geographer and climatologist
- Ben Santer (1955–), climatologist at Lawrence Livermore National Laboratory
- Nicola Scafetta (1975–), Italian astronomer and climate scientist
- Hans Joachim Schellnhuber (1950–), German climatologist, was an author for the Third Assessment Report of the Intergovernmental Panel on Climate Change
- David Schindler, Canadian-American environmental chemist, professor of ecology at University of Alberta
- Michael Schlesinger, American professor of Atmospheric Sciences at UIUC
- William H. Schlesinger (1950–), American biogeochemist, former Dean of the Nicholas School at Duke University
- Gavin A. Schmidt, American climatologist and climate modeler at the NASA Goddard Institute for Space Studies (GISS)
- Stephen H. Schneider (1945–2010), American, Professor of Environmental Biology and Global Change at Stanford University
- Daniel P. Schrag (1966–), American, Professor of Geology at Harvard University and Director of the Harvard University Center for the Environment
- Stephen E. Schwartz (1941–), American, chemistry of air pollutants, radiative forcing of aerosols on climate
- Tom Segalstad (1949–), Norwegian geochemist
- Wolfgang Seiler (1940–), German climatologist at the Karlsruhe Institute of Technology
- John H. Seinfeld, American atmospheric chemist at California Institute of Technology
- Mark Serreze (1960–), American geographer/climatologist, director of the National Snow and Ice Data Center
- Nicholas Shackleton (1937–2006), British palaeoclimatologist at Cambridge University
- Nir Shaviv (1972–), Israeli‐American astrophysicist and climate scientist
- J. Marshall Shepherd, American professor of meteorology at University of Georgia
- Drew Shindell, American atmospheric chemist, professor of Climate Sciences at Duke University
- Keith Shine, Regius Professor of Meteorology and Climate Science at the University of Reading
- Jagdish Shukla (1944–), Indian-American climatologist at George Mason University
- Joanne Simpson (1923–2010), American meteorologist
- Fred Singer (1924–2020), atmospheric physicist, president of the Science & Environmental Policy Project, a climate change denialist group
- Julia Slingo (1950–), chief scientist at the Met Office since 2009
- Joseph Smagorinsky (1924–2005), American meteorologist; first head of NOAA GFDL
- Robert H. Socolow, Princeton University professor who collaborated on the Climate stabilization wedge
- Susan Solomon (1956–), American, research in chlorofluorocarbons and ozone depletion
- Richard C. J. Somerville (1941–), American climatologist Scripps Institution of Oceanography
- Kozma Spassky-Avtonomov (1807–1890), Russian climatologist
- Roy Spencer, climatologist, research scientist at the University of Alabama
- Konrad Steffen (1952–2020), Swiss-American glaciologist at University of Colorado Boulder
- Will Steffen (1947–2023), Australian climatologist, science advisor to Australian government
- Allison Steiner, Professor at the University of Michigan
- David Stephenson (1963–), British, climate scientist and statistician at the University of Exeter.
- Thomas Stocker, Swiss, climate dynamics and paleoclimate modeling and reconstruction
- Hans von Storch (1949–), German, meteorologist of Geesthacht, Germany
- Peter A. Stott, British, climate scientist.
- Hans E. Suess (1909–1993), Austrian, radiocarbon dating
- Henrik Svensmark, Professor in the Division of Solar System Physics at the Danish National Space Institute

== T ==
- Kevin Russel Tate (1943–2018), New Zealand soil chemist, studied carbon cycling and sequestration in soils
- Simon Tett, British, detection and attribution of climate change, model initialization, and validation
- Peter Thejll (1956–), Danish, Northern Hemisphere land air temperature, solar variation and greenhouse effect
- Peter Thorne, British climatologist with the Nansen Environmental and Remote Sensing Centre, Bergen, Norway
- C. W. Thornthwaite (1899–1963), American geographer and climatologist responsible for the Thornthwaite climate classification
- Liz Thomas, British palaeoclimatologist, ice cores, British Antarctic Survey
- Lonnie Thompson (1948–), American, Professor of Earth Sciences, Ohio State University paleoclimatology, ice cores
- Axel Timmermann, German climate physicist and oceanographer, director of IBS Center for Climate Physics
- Micha Tomkiewicz (1939–), American climate change professor at Brooklyn College
- Owen Toon, American professor of Atmospheric and Ocean Sciences at University of Colorado Boulder
- Kevin E. Trenberth, decadal variability, El Niño-Southern Oscillation
- Susan Trumbore, earth systems scientist focusing on the carbon cycle and its effects on climate, director at the Max Planck Institute for Biogeochemistry and a professor of Earth System Science at University of California, Irvine
- John Tyndall (1820–1893), British, measured radiative effect of greenhouse gases, postulated greenhouse effect hypothesis of climate change

== V ==
- Jean-Pascal van Ypersele (1957–), Belgian climatologist, Vice-chair of IPCC (2008–2015)
- David Vaughan, ice sheets, British Antarctic Survey
- Ján Veizer (1941–), Slovak, Distinguished University Professor emeritus of Earth Sciences at the University of Ottawa
- Pier Vellinga (1950–), Dutch climatologist, professor at Wageningen University
- Ricardo Villalba, Argentine paleoclimatologist
- Françoise Vimeux, French climatologist, research director at the Institut de recherche pour le développement (IRD), works at the Laboratoire des sciences du climat et de l'environnement (LSCE) and the Laboratoire HydroSciences Montpellier (HSM)

== W ==
- Peter Wadhams ScD (1948–), professor of Ocean Physics, and Head of the Polar Ocean Physics Group in the Department of Applied Mathematics and Theoretical Physics, University of Cambridge. He is best known for his work on sea ice.
- Warren M. Washington (1936–2024), American, climate modelling
- John Michael Wallace, North Atlantic oscillation, Arctic oscillation, El Niño-Southern Oscillation
- Andrew Watson (1952–), British, marine and atmospheric sciences
- Sir Robert Watson, British scientist and chief scientist for the World Bank
- Betsy Weatherhead, American, former head of the National Climate Assessment
- Andrew J. Weaver, Canadian, climate modeling and analysis.
- Harry Wexler (1911–1962), American meteorologist
- Penny Whetton, Australian, regional climate change projections for Australia. A lead author of the IPCC Third and fourth Assessment Report on Climate Change.
- Tom Wigley, Australian climatologist at University of Adelaide
- Josh Willis, American oceanographer at NASA's JPL
- David Wratt, New Zealander, chief scientist at NIWA
- Donald Wuebbles, American atmospheric scientist and professor at the University of Illinois at Urbana–Champaign
- Carl Wunsch (1941–), physical oceanography and ocean acoustic tomography

== X ==
- Shang-Ping Xie (1963–), climatologist and oceanographer of the Scripps Institution of Oceanography

== Z ==
- Laure Zanna, Professor in Mathematics & Atmosphere/Ocean Science at the Courant Institute of Mathematical Sciences
- Olga Zolina (1975–), Russian climatologist
- Eduardo Zorita (1961–), Spanish palaeoclimatologist, senior scientist at GKSS

== See also ==
- List of women climate scientists and activists
- Women in climate change
