= Susan Anderson (disambiguation) =

Susan Anderson (1870–1960) was the first woman to practice medicine in Colorado.

Susan or Sue Anderson may also refer to:

- Susan Anderson (politician) (1945–2025), American politician
- Susan Anderson (psychotherapist) (born 1946), author of self-help books on failed romantic relationships
- Susan Pitt (1948–2024), married name Anderson, American swimmer
- Sue Anderson (musician) (1954–2025), American conductor and pianist

== See also ==
- Susan Andersen (born 1950), American writer of romance novels
- Susanne Andersen (born 1998), Norwegian racing cyclist
- Suzanne Anderson, American geophysicist
