= Chiara Giorio =

Italian atmospheric chemist

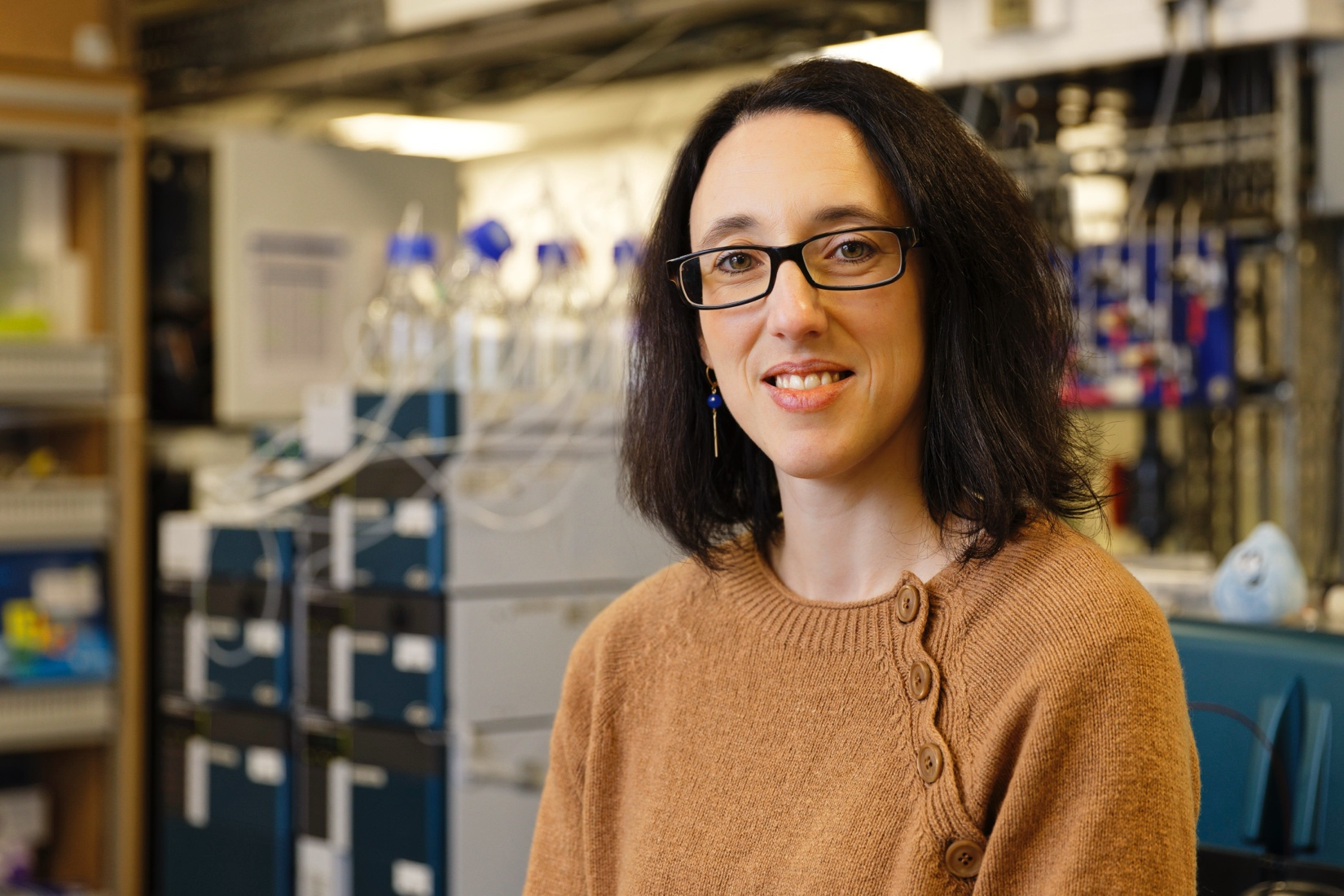
- Dr. Chiara Giorio in March 2023
- Born: 5 July 1984 (age 41); Vicenza, Italy
- Education: University of Padova
- Awards: Environment, Sustainability and Energy Division Early Career Award...... (2021)
- Scientific career
- Fields: Chemistry, Atmospheric science
- Institutions: University of Cambridge
- Thesis: Aerosol characterization by PMF analysis of single particle ATOFMS spectra (2012)
- Academic advisors: Andrea Tapparo
- Website: The Giorio Group; Cambridge University webpage

Chiara Giorio is an Italian atmospheric chemist and assistant professor in the Yusuf Hamied Department of Chemistry at the University of Cambridge, a Fellow of Christ's College and a Fellow of the Community for Analytical Measurement Science.

Her research is focused on the chemistry of the Earth’s atmosphere and its impact on air quality and climate.

== Early life and education ==
Giorio was born and grew up in Vicenza, Italy. She attended the Liceo Scientifico G.B. Quadri where she became interested in chemistry. She then studied at the University of Padua, where she received her bachelor's degree in 2006 and master's degree in 2008 in chemistry. Giorio attained a PhD in molecular sciences from the University of Padua on 28 February 2012.

== Research and career ==
After her studies, Giorio became a postdoc at the University of Padua where she worked on the environmental dispersion of neonicotinoid insecticides through dust emitted by seeders during the sowing of corn seeds treated with neonicotinoids, and the consequential in-flight contamination and acute toxicity for honeybees. She also worked on assessing the usability and environmental impact of vineyard pruning residues as an energy source.

In 2013, Giorio transferred to the University of Cambridge as a postdoctoral research associate in the Department of Chemistry in the Markus Kalberer research group. In Cambridge, Giorio‘s research was focused on determining the chemical composition and formation processes of secondary organic aerosols. She developed a method for the quantification of the highly reactive Criegee intermediates produced by ozonolysis reactions in the atmosphere and she studied the impact of aqueous phase processing on aerosol composition

In January 2017, Giorio became a researcher at the French National Centre for Scientific Research and later that year, became tenure-track assistant professor at the University of Padua. As of March 2020, she is an assistant professor at the University of Cambridge. Research in Giorio’s Research Group is focused on the chemistry of the Earth’s atmosphere and its impact on air quality and climate.

=== Contribution to COVID-19 ===
In April 2020, Cambridge University’s Centre for Atmospheric Science and the Defence Science and Technology Laboratory (Dstl) worked together to test how ozone could speed up the cleaning of ambulances and potentially save lives. As part of this testing, the Giorio Research Group used an ozone generator to produce ozone at controlled concentrations in a fume cupboard containing the indicators and sensors, which scientists at the Dstl could use as a baseline in their testing.

=== Neonicotinoid pesticides ===
Giorio’s research on the translocation of neonicotinoid insecticides. Giorio’s research has also helped in introducing regulations against neonicotinoids.

In recognition of Giorio’s work on neonicotinoid insecticides, she won the Royal Society of Chemistry’s Environment, Sustainability and Energy Division Early Career Award in 2021.

== Selected publications ==
- Giorio C, D’Aronco S, Di Marco V, Badocco D, Battaglia F, Soldà L, Pastore P, Tapparo A (2022) Emerging investigator series: aqueous-phase processing of atmospheric aerosol influences dissolution kinetics of metal ions in an urban background site in the Po Valley. Environ Sci Process Impacts 24:884–897. Emerging investigator series: aqueous-phase processing of atmospheric aerosol influences dissolution kinetics of metal ions in an urban background site in the Po Valley
- Giorio C, Doussin JF, D’Anna B, Mas S, Filippi D, Denjean C, Mallet MD, Bourrianne T, Burnet F, Cazaunau M, Chikwililwa C, Desboeufs K, Feron A, Michoud V, Namwoonde A, Andreae MO, Piketh SJ, Formenti P (2022) Butene Emissions From Coastal Ecosystems May Contribute to New Particle Formation. Geophys Res Lett 49:. Butene Emissions From Coastal Ecosystems May Contribute to New Particle Formation
- Giorio C, Bortolini C, Kourtchev I, Tapparo A, Bogialli S, Kalberer M (2019) Direct target and non-target analysis of urban aerosol sample extracts using atmospheric pressure photoionisation high-resolution mass spectrometry. Chemosphere 224:786–795. Direct target and non-target analysis of urban aerosol sample extracts using atmospheric pressure photoionisation high-resolution mass spectrometry
- Giorio C, Pizzini S, Marchiori E, Piazza R, Grigolato S, Zanetti M, Cavalli R, Simoncin M, Soldà L, Badocco D, Tapparo A (2019) Sustainability of using vineyard pruning residues as an energy source: Combustion performances and environmental impact. Fuel 243:371–380. Sustainability of using vineyard pruning residues as an energy source: Combustion performances and environmental impact
- Giorio C, Kehrwald N, Barbante C, Kalberer M, King ACF, Thomas ER, Wolff EW, Zennaro P (2018) Prospects for reconstructing paleoenvironmental conditions from organic compounds in polar snow and ice. Quat Sci Rev 183:1–22 . Prospects for reconstructing paleoenvironmental conditions from organic compounds in polar snow and ice
- Giorio C, Marton D, Formenton G, Tapparo A (2017) Formation of Metal–Cyanide Complexes in Deliquescent Airborne Particles: A New Possible Sink for HCN in Urban Environments. Environ Sci Technol 51:14107–14113. Formation of Metal–Cyanide Complexes in Deliquescent Airborne Particles: A New Possible Sink for HCN in Urban Environments
- Giorio C, Monod A, Brégonzio-Rozier L, DeWitt HL, Cazaunau M, Temime-Roussel B, Gratien A, Michoud V, Pangui E, Ravier S, Zielinski AT, Tapparo A, Vermeylen R, Claeys M, Voisin D, Kalberer M, Doussin J-F (2017) Cloud Processing of Secondary Organic Aerosol from Isoprene and Methacrolein Photooxidation. J Phys Chem A 121:7641–7654. Cloud Processing of Secondary Organic Aerosol from Isoprene and Methacrolein Photooxidation
- Harrison RM, Giorio C, Beddows DCS, Dall’Osto M (2010) Size distribution of airborne particles controls outcome of epidemiological studies. Sci Total Environ 409:289–293. Size distribution of airborne particles controls outcome of epidemiological studies
