= Ana Ravelo =

Paleoceanographer

Ana Christina Ravelo
- Education: Columbia University
- Scientific career
- Workplaces: University of California Santa Cruz
- Thesis: Reconstructing the tropical Atlantic seasonal thermocline using planktonic foraminifera (1991)

Ana Ravelo is a paleoceanographer known for her research on tropical oceans. She is a professor at the University of California Santa Cruz and was elected a fellow of the American Geophysical Union in 2012.

== Early life ==
Ravelo grew up in a suburb of Los Angeles where she enjoyed hiking, skiing and other outdoor activities. Science and math captured her academic interests, but she was also interested in cultural differences and stories about race which she investigated in books by Toni Morrison, Zora Neale Hurston, and Amy Tan. Her father was a cardiologist in Cuba and subsequently practiced in Brooklyn, and her mother was trained as a pharmacist while in the Philippines.

== Education and career ==
Ravelo attended public schools until high school when she moved to a private school in Pasena. She went to Stanford University for her undergraduate education where she double-majored in anthropology and geology which she combined into studies on paleoanthropology. During her time at Stanford she became interested in oceanography, especially paleoceanography, which attracted her because it combines physics, math, chemistry, and biology. After finishing her undergraduate work in 1994, Ravelo moved to Columbia University where she received an M.A., M.Phil, and a Ph.D. in geological sciences. She spent time as a postdoctoral investigator at Princeton University where she modeled changes in ocean conditions. In 1991, Ravelo moved to the University of California Santa Cruz where she is a professor in the ocean sciences department.

From 2005 until 2011, Ravelo served as the director of the Santa Cruz branch of the Institute of Geophysics and Planetary Physics, a University of California research initiative designed to foster interdisciplinary research.

== Research ==
Ravelo's research centers on the tropical ocean, especially the Pacific ocean. Her Ph.D. research examined different species of foraminifera and used their geochemistry to reconstruct changes in temperature over geologic eras. Ravelo uses a combination of collection of samples from the field, such as from sites in the Bering Sea where she led a 2009 expedition to collect sediment samples that allow her to examine changes in the region's temperatures over the last 4.5 million years. She also uses climate modeling to examine past changes in the ocean's hydrography, nitrogen cycling, and carbon dioxide concentrations. In the Pacific Ocean, Ravelo's research revealed a shift to El Niño-like conditions in the Pliocene, 4.5 to 3 million years ago. In 2021, Ravelo's research revealed a history of recurrent hypoxia in the Bering Sea, which results from productivity fueled by iron from continental shelves.

=== Selected publications ===
- Ravelo, Ana Christina; Andreasen, Dyke H.; Lyle, Mitchell; Olivarez Lyle, Annette; Wara, Michael W. (May 2004). "Regional climate shifts caused by gradual global cooling in the Pliocene epoch". Nature. 429 (6989): 263–267. Bibcode:2004Natur.429..263R. doi:10.1038/nature02567. ISSN 1476-4687. PMID 15152244. S2CID 4371579.
- Wara, M. W.; Ravelo, Ana Christina; Delaney, Margaret L. (29 July 2005). "Permanent El Nino-Like Conditions During the Pliocene Warm Period". Science. 309 (5735): 758–761. Bibcode:2005Sci...309..758W. doi:10.1126/science.1112596. JSTOR 3842403. PMID 15976271. S2CID 37042990.
- Fedorov, A. V. (9 June 2006). "The Pliocene Paradox (Mechanisms for a Permanent El Nino)". Science. 312 (5779): 1485–1489. Bibcode:2006Sci...312.1485F. doi:10.1126/science.1122666. PMID 16763140. S2CID 36446661.
- LaRiviere, Jonathan P.; Ravelo, A. Christina; Crimmins, Allison; Dekens, Petra S.; Ford, Heather L.; Lyle, Mitch; Wara, Michael W. (June 2012). "Late Miocene decoupling of oceanic warmth and atmospheric carbon dioxide forcing". Nature. 486 (7401): 97–100. Bibcode:2012Natur.486...97L. doi:10.1038/nature11200. ISSN 1476-4687. PMID 22678287. S2CID 205229348.
- Knudson, Karla P.; Ravelo, Ana Christina; Aiello, Ivano W.; Knudson, Christina P.; Drake, Michelle K.; Sakamoto, Tatsuhiko (2021). "Causes and timing of recurring subarctic Pacific hypoxia". Science Advances. 7 (23) eabg2906. Bibcode:2021SciA....7.2906K. doi:10.1126/sciadv.abg2906. ISSN 2375-2548. PMC 11210308. PMID 34078607.

== Awards and honors ==
- Fellow, American Geophysical Union (2012)
- Fellow, California Academy of Arts and Sciences (2020)

== Personal life ==
Ravelo has three children.
