= Margaret Delaney =

Marine geochemist

Margaret Lois Delaney
- Scientific career
- Institutions: University of California, Santa Cruz
- Thesis: Foraminiferal trace elements : uptake, diagenesis, and 100 m.y. paleochemical history (1983)
- Doctoral advisor: Edward A. Boyle

Margaret (Peggy) Delaney is marine geochemist known for her research on trace elements to examine changes in ocean chemistry over time.

== Education and career ==
Delaney earned her B.S. in chemistry from Yale University in 1973 and a Ph.D. from the Massachusetts Institute of Technology/Woods Hole Oceanographic Institution Joint Program (1983). Following her Ph.D., Delaney joined the University of California Santa Cruz in 1983, and later became chair of the Ocean Sciences Department. At the time of her retirement in 2020, Delaney was Vice Chancellor for Planning and Budget at the University of California Santa Cruz.

In her service to the community, Delaney was the editor of the journal Paleoceanography and Paleoclimatology from 1996 to 1999. In 2005, Delaney started a three-year term as editor of the journal Earth and Planetary Sciences. She was also involved in the leadership and management of the Ocean Drilling Program (ODP) and the Integrated Ocean Drilling Program (IODP).

In 2004, Delaney was elected a fellow of the American Geophysical Union and the citation noted her:

innovative work defining links between biogeochemically important elements and past changes in climate; and her altruistic and exemplary service to the oceanographic community

== Research ==
Delaney's research used geochemical measurements to examine changes in ocean chemistry. She looked at concentration of trace elements in shells of foraminifera and was the first to show that changes in the ratios of elements such as lithium, strontium, and calcium were linked to environmental conditions experienced by the foraminifera. These elemental ratios in corals can be used to reconstruct ocean chemistry and Delaney examined trace element levels in corals found at the Galapagos Islands. In marine sediments, Delaney examined the accumulation of phosphorus in the equatorial Pacific, tracked phosphorus from riverine sources and particles to the seafloor. Delaney applied these geochemical tools to studies of the Pliocene, the Paleocene-Eocene Thermal Maximum, and changes in the ocean currents around Antarctica.

=== Selected publications ===
- Delaney, M. L. (1998). "Phosphorus accumulation in marine sediments and the oceanic phosphorus cycle". Global Biogeochemical Cycles. 12 (4): 563–572. Bibcode:1998GBioC..12..563D. doi:10.1029/98GB02263.
- Wara, M. W.; Ravelo, Ana Christina; Delaney, Margaret L. (2005-07-29). "Permanent El Nino-Like Conditions During the Pliocene Warm Period". Science. 309 (5735): 758–761. Bibcode:2005Sci...309..758W. doi:10.1126/science.1112596. ISSN 0036-8075. PMID 15976271. S2CID 37042990.
- Delaney, Margaret Lois; Bé, Allan W.H.; Boyle, Edward A. (1985-06-01). "Li, Sr, Mg, and Na in foraminiferal calcite shells from laboratory culture, sediment traps, and sediment cores". Geochimica et Cosmochimica Acta. 49 (6): 1327–1341. Bibcode:1985GeCoA..49.1327D. doi:10.1016/0016-7037(85)90284-4. ISSN 0016-7037.
- Filippelli, Gabriel M.; Delaney, Margaret Lois (1996-05-01). "Phosphorus geochemistry of equatorial Pacific sediments". Geochimica et Cosmochimica Acta. 60 (9): 1479–1495. Bibcode:1996GeCoA..60.1479F. doi:10.1016/0016-7037(96)00042-7. ISSN 0016-7037.

== Awards and honors ==
- Fellow, American Geophysical Union (2004)
- Fellow, The Oceanography Society (2005)
- Outstanding Educator Award, Association for Women Geoscientists (1993)
