= Linda Mearns =

Geographer and climate scientist (1949-2025)

- Born: 1949; Long Island, New York, U.S.
- Died: January 23, 2025 (aged 75); Boulder, Colorado, U.S.
- Education: University of Wisconsin–Madison; University of California, Los Angeles
- Scientific career
- Fields: Climatology and geography

Linda Opal Mearns (1949 – 23 January 2025) was an American geographer and climate scientist specializing in climate change assessment science. Mearns was a senior scientist at the National Center for Atmospheric Research (NCAR). Mearns is the director of NCAR's Weather and Climate Impacts Assessment Science Program (WCIASP) and head of the Regional Integrated Sciences Collective (RISC). Mearns was a lead principal investigator for the North American Regional Climate Change Program (NARCCAP).

== Biography ==
Mearns was born in 1949 on Long Island, New York. She earned her BA in philosophy at the University of Wisconsin–Madison before pursuing a diploma in French language skills. She finished her graduate studies in geography and climatology at the University of California, Los Angeles, completing her master’s and PhD there. She pursued a postdoctoral fellowship in 1987 at the National Science Foundation’s National Center for Atmospheric Research (NCAR) in Boulder, Colorado. During the next four decades she was named Senior Scientist in 1995 and directed an institute and several other programs. At NCAR, she pioneered research on climate change, from regional climate modeling, climate change scenario development, and decision making under uncertainty, to climate impacts on agriculture, ecosystems, and the built environment.

Mearns was an author on the Second (1995), Third (2001), Fourth (2007), Fifth (2013) and Sixth (2021) Assessment Reports of the United Nations (UN) Intergovernmental Panel on Climate Change (IPCC). Mearns was a lead principal investigator for the North American Regional Climate Change Program (NARCCAP) which uses data that Mearns was involved in generating to produce data-based climate simulations to predict future climate scenarios.

Mearns died at her home in Boulder, Colorado at 75 on January 23, 2025, after battling pancreatic cancer.

== Selected publications ==
=== Books ===
- Mearns, Linda O. (2003). Issues in the impacts of climate variability and change on agriculture: applications to the southeastern United States. Kluwer Academic Publishers. ISBN 9781402016189.
- Uncertainty in Climate Change Research: An Integrated Approach. Linda O. Mearns, Chris E. Forest, Hayley J. Fowler, Robert Lempert, Robert L. Wilby (eds.). Cham: Springer Nature Switzerland. 2025. ISBN 978-3-031-85541-2.

=== Journal articles ===
- Giorgi, F. and Mearns, L. O. Approaches to the simulation of regional climate change: A review. 1991. Reviews of Geophysics 29 (2), 191.
- Bukovsky, M. S., Thompson, J. A., Mearns, L. O. Weighting a Regional Climate Model Ensemble: Does It Make a Difference? Can It Make a Difference? 2019. Climate Research 77 (1), 23-43.
- Mearns, L. O., Katz, R. W., and Schneider, S. H. Extreme High-Temperature Events: Changes in their probabilities with Changes in Mean Temperature. 1984. Journal of Climate and Applied Meteorology 23 (12), 1601-1613.
- Giorgi, F. and Mearns, L. O. 1999. Introduction to special section: Regional Climate Modeling Revisited. Journal of Geophysical Research 104 (D6), 6335-6352.
- Easterling, D. R., Meehl, G. A., Parmesan, C., Changnon, S. A., Karl, T. R., and Mearns L. O. 2000. Climate Extremes: Observations, Modeling, and Impacts. Science 289 (5487), 2068-2074.
- Giorgi, F. and Mearns, L. O. Calculation of Average, Uncertainty Range, and Reliability of Regional Climate Changes from AOGCM Simulations via the “Reliability Ensemble Averaging” (REA) Method. 2002. Journal of Climate 15 (10), 1141-1158.
- Feddema, J. J., Oleson, K. W., Bonan G. B., Mearns L. O., Buja L. E., Meehl G. A., Washington W. M. 2005. The Importance of Land-Cover Change in Simulating Future Climates. Science 310 (5754), 1674-1678.

== Selected awards and honors ==
- 2006 Fellow of the American Meteorological Society
- 2016 American Association of Geographers (AAG) Distinguished Scholarship Award
- 2017 recipient of the American Geophysical Union Stephen Schneider Lecture
