= Allison Steiner =

American scientist specializing in atmospheric chemistry

- Education: Johns Hopkins University
- Known for: Atmosphere Chemistry
- Scientific career
- Thesis: The Influence of Atmospheric Chemistry and Climate on Biosphere-Atmosphere Interactions
- Website: http://clasp-research.engin.umich.edu/faculty/steiner/index.html

Allison Steiner is a professor in the University of Michigan's Department of Climate and Space Sciences and Engineering. She specializes in atmosphere-biosphere interactions. Steiner has received over five awards for her contributions, and she served on a National Academies of Sciences, Engineering, and Medicine panel. She has also contributed to the geoscience community by founding the Earth Science Women’s Network.

== Early life and education ==
In 1994, Allison Steiner received her B.S in Chemical Engineering at Johns Hopkins University in Baltimore, MD. In 2003, she had earned a Ph.D. in Atmospheric Science at the Georgia Institute of Technology. Her thesis, advised by William L. Chameides, focused on the exchanges between the biosphere and the atmosphere.

== Career and research ==
Allison Steiner began her career in 1994 at Sadat Associates, Inc., where she worked as an environmental and air quality engineer for 2 years. She became a research assistant in 1997 at the Georgia Institute of Technology, and worked there until she earned her Ph.D. in 2003. In 2000, Steiner became a visiting scientist at the International Institute for Applied Systems Analysis and worked in Laxenburg, Austria for four months. In 2001 Steiner was a visiting scientist again, this time for five months at the Physics of the Weather and Climate Group International Centre for Theoretical Physics, located in Trieste, Italy. By August 2003, Steiner had returned to the United States, and worked for a month as a visiting scientist at the Atmospheric Chemistry Division National Center for Atmospheric Research in Boulder, Colorado. Later that year, Steiner began work as a postdoctoral research fellow in the Department of Environmental Science, Policy and Management at the University of California, Berkeley. She stayed there until 2006, when she began teaching at the University of Michigan in the Department of Atmospheric, Oceanic and Space Sciences. Steiner became a professor in the Department of Climate and Space Sciences and Engineering.

Steiner's research focuses on atmospheric chemistry, and specifically, exchanges between the biosphere and the atmosphere. One of the most prominent publications she worked on focused on furthering climate change research worldwide through the use of climate modeling, while other highly cited publications focus on air pollution's effect on regional air quality. Through the use of a wide range of techniques and tools, Steiner has made significant contributions to the field's understanding of biosphere-atmosphere feedbacks.

== Awards and honors ==
• University of Michigan Harold R. Johnson Diversity Service Award 2018. Steiner received this award as an acknowledgement of her hard work to diversify and strengthen the scientific community. She was commended for her initiative in founding the Earth Science Women’s Network, as well as her work as Chair for the University of Michigan's CoE Dean's Advisory Committee on Female Faculty.

• American Geophysical Union Atmospheric Sciences Ascent Award 2015. This award recognized Steiner as a leader in the field for her notable research, work founding the Earth Science Women’s Network, and for serving as the editor for the Journal of Geophysical Research: Atmospheres.

• University of Michigan Henry Russel Award 2013

• University of Michigan AOSS Faculty Achievement Award 2011

• National Science Foundation CAREER Award 2010

• Early Career Award, Gordon Conference for Biogenic Hydrocarbons 2004

• Early Career Award, Gordon Conference for Atmospheric Chemistry (ACCESS) 2003

• NCAR Atmospheric Chemistry Division Fellowship 2003

• NASA Earth System Science Fellowship 2000-2003

• Senior Dean’s Fellow Award, School of Earth & Atmospheric Sciences, Georgia Tech 2002

• Young Scientists’ Summer Fellowship, IIASA 2000

• William B. Rhodes Graduate Fellowship, School of EAS, Georgia Tech 1999-2000

== Selected publications ==
- Pal, Jeremy S.; Giorgi, Filippo; Bi, Xunqiang; Elguindi, Nellie; Solmon, Fabien; Gao, Xuejie; Rauscher, Sara A.; Francisco, Raquel; Zakey, Ashraf; Winter, Jonathan; Ashfaq, Moetasim; Syed, Faisal S.; Bell, Jason L.; Diffenbaugh, Noah S.; Karmacharya, Jagadish; Konaré, Abourahamane; Martinez, Daniel; Da Rocha, Rosmeri P.; Sloan, Lisa C.; Steiner, Allison L. (2007). "Regional Climate Modeling for the Developing World: The ICTP RegCM3 and RegCNET" (PDF). Bulletin of the American Meteorological Society. 88 (9): 1395–1410. Bibcode:2007BAMS...88.1395P. doi:10.1175/bams-88-9-1395.
- Michalak, A. M.; Anderson, E. J.; Beletsky, D.; Boland, S.; Bosch, N. S.; Bridgeman, T. B.; Chaffin, J. D.; Cho, K.; Confesor, R.; Daloglu, I.; Depinto, J. V.; Evans, M. A.; Fahnenstiel, G. L.; He, L.; Ho, J. C.; Jenkins, L.; Johengen, T. H.; Kuo, K. C.; Laporte, E.; Liu, X.; McWilliams, M. R.; Moore, M. R.; Posselt, D. J.; Richards, R. P.; Scavia, D.; Steiner, A. L.; Verhamme, E.; Wright, D. M.; Zagorski, M. A. (2013). "Record-setting algal bloom in Lake Erie caused by agricultural and meteorological trends consistent with expected future conditions". Proceedings of the National Academy of Sciences. 110 (16): 6448–6452. Bibcode:2013PNAS..110.6448M. doi:10.1073/pnas.1216006110. PMC 3631662. PMID 23576718.
- Fiore, Arlene M.; Naik, Vaishali; Spracklen, Dominick V.; Steiner, Allison; Unger, Nadine; Prather, Michael; Bergmann, Dan; Cameron-Smith, Philip J.; Cionni, Irene; Collins, William J.; Dalsøren, Stig; Eyring, Veronika; Folberth, Gerd A.; Ginoux, Paul; Horowitz, Larry W.; Josse, Béatrice; Lamarque, Jean-François; MacKenzie, Ian A.; Nagashima, Tatsuya; O'Connor, Fiona M.; Righi, Mattia; Rumbold, Steven T.; Shindell, Drew T.; Skeie, Ragnhild B.; Sudo, Kengo; Szopa, Sophie; Takemura, Toshihiko; Zeng, Guang (2012). "Global air quality and climate". Chemical Society Reviews. 41 (19): 6663–83. doi:10.1039/C2CS35095E. hdl:2060/20140002242. PMID 22868337.
- Steiner, Allison L.; Tonse, Shaheen; Cohen, Ronald C.; Goldstein, Allen H.; Harley, Robert A. (2006). "Influence of future climate and emissions on regional air quality in California". Journal of Geophysical Research. 111 (D18): D18303. Bibcode:2006JGRD..11118303S. doi:10.1029/2005JD006935.
- Steiner, Allison L.; Pal, Jeremy S.; Rauscher, Sara A.; Bell, Jason L.; Diffenbaugh, Noah S.; Boone, Aaron; Sloan, Lisa C.; Giorgi, Filippo (2009). "Land surface coupling in regional climate simulations of the West African monsoon". Climate Dynamics. 33 (6): 869–892. Bibcode:2009ClDy...33..869S. doi:10.1007/s00382-009-0543-6. S2CID 129924113.

== Public engagement ==
As part of research conducted under the CAREER Award Steiner received in 2010, Steiner worked with middle and high schoolers in Detroit, Michigan and Ypsilanti, Michigan to introduce them to the scientific method and improve the development of the pollen emissions model used in her research.

== Personal life ==
Allison Steiner is married to Deryl Seale.
