= László Makra =

Hungarian climatologist, university professor

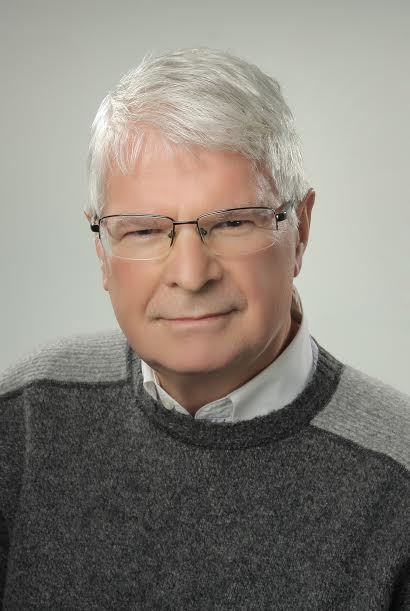
- László Makra
- Born: 5 June 1952 (age 73); Siklós, Hungary
- Occupation(s): climatologist professor
- Years active: from 1976 in University of Szeged
- Known for: Academia
- Notable work: “Analysis of statistical characteristics of the sea-level pressure field for the whole Earth." PhD 1995

László Makra (Siklós, 5 June 1952) is a Hungarian climatologist and university professor. His main research area is pollen climatology and, within this, analysis of climatological relationships of ragweed pollen, as well as relationship between ragweed pollen concentration and respiratory diseases.

== Career ==
László Makra graduated from high school in 1970 at Komló, and then in 1971 enrolled at the József Attila University of Szeged, Faculty of Natural Sciences, reading mathematics and geography, and graduating in 1976. Afterwards he started working as assistant lecturer at the Department of Climatology of the university. From 1996 to 2015 he was associate professor at the same department and, since 2015, he has been working at the Faculty of Agriculture, Institute of Management and Rural Development of Szeged University, located in Hódmezővásárhely. In 2016, he became a full professor.

He defended his university doctoral thesis in 1978 and PhD thesis in 1995, respectively. Later, in 2004 he was habilitated at the University of Debrecen. He spent several weeks on study tours in Indonesia (Yogyakarta, 1989), China Beijing, 1993; Guangzhou (Canton), 1995] and the Czech Republic (Brno, 1996). He is a member of the editorial board of several Hungarian scientific periodicals, editor in an international scientific journal, member of the editorial board of seven international scientific journals, and is also committee member of the International Ragweed Society (2014- to date).

== Research ==
His main research area is background aerosol and bio-aerosol and, within the latter, climatic relationships of pollen, i.e. pollen climatology. This is a relatively new area in the international literature and a completely new area in Hungary. His research activities within pollen climatology are as follows: pollen statistics; pollen transport modeling; pollen concentration forecast; analysis of the relationship between respiratory diseases and pollen concentration; climate sensitivity analysis of different taxa; as well as expected future pollen concentrations within the context of climate change.

=== Key results ===
He led successful instrumental field research expeditions into Inner Asia (China, Xinjiang Uygur Autonomous Region in 1990 and 1994), Indonesia (Java, Bali, 1996) and South America (Brazil, 1998) in order to determine the elemental composition of the regional background aerosol. The air samples collected by him and the data obtained were processed together with his colleagues at the Institute for Nuclear Research, Hungarian Academy of Sciences, in Debrecen.

=== Main results of the expeditions ===
==== China expeditions (1990, 1994) ====
The high sulfur and chlorine content of the regional aerosol is of natural origin (rock salt, Glauber's salt, gypsum), and it is a consequence of the widespread and intense salt accumulation in the outlet of the Tarim Basin. Secondly the elemental ratios of Si/Fe and Ca/Fe can be used as markers to track the long-range transport of aerosol coming from the Takla Makan area resulting in the yellow wind phenomenon over the inner and eastern parts of China, and called the Kosa phenomenon over Japan, the Pacific Ocean and North America.

==== Indonesian expedition (1996) ====
Chlorine, sulfur, copper, zinc and chromium are substantially enriched in the atmospheric aerosol both over Java and Bali; most of the chlorine is of oceanic origin (ocean mist) and the sulfur is partly of anthropogenic origin and partly comes from biogenic emissions of the ocean; and copper, zinc and chromium probably originate from soils.

== Pollen climatology ==
László Makra established the branch of pollen climatology in Hungary. He is an internationally recognised researcher of the transport of particulate matter and bio-aerosol. He also identified the key source areas of long-range ragweed pollen transport arriving in the Carpathian Basin. He developed a procedure for separating long-range transport and regional transport of particulate matter and ragweed pollen, respectively. In addition, he determined the components of the transport, as well as the relative quantity of the net transport in the comprehensive and detailed maps of the quantitative and phenological parameters of ragweed pollen for Europe, and with these phenological parameters he produced the first maps for the continent.

He is the author or co-author of over three hundred scientific publications.

== Major publications ==
- Enrichment of desert soil elements in Takla Makan dust aerosol (co-author, 2002)
- Meteorological variables connected with airborne ragweed pollen in Southern Hungary (co-author, 2004)
- Selections from the history of environmental pollution, with special attention to air pollution (co-author, 2004)
- The history and impacts of airborne Ambrosia (Asteraceae) pollen in Hungary (co-author, 2005)
- Airborne pollen in three European cities: Detection of atmospheric circulation pathways by applying three-dimensional clustering of backward trajectories (co-author, 2010)
- Forecasting ragweed pollen characteristics with nonparametric regression methods over the most polluted areas in Europe (co-author, 2011)
- Monitoring the long-range transport effects on urban PM10 levels using 3D clusters of backward trajectories (co-author, 2011)
- Multivariate analysis of respiratory problems and their connection with meteorological parameters and the main biological and chemical air pollutants (co-author, 2011)
- Assessment of the Daily Ragweed Pollen Concentration with Previous-Day Meteorological Variables Using Regression and Quantile Regression Analysis for Szeged, Hungary (co-author, 2011)
- Trends in the characteristics of allergenic pollen circulation in Central Europe based on the example of Szeged, Hungary (co-author, 2011)
- Association of allergic asthma emergency room visits with the main biological and chemical air pollutants (co-author, 2012)
- Climate sensitivity of allergenic taxa in Central Europe associated with new climate change – related forces (co-author, 2013)
- Characterizing and evaluating the role of different transport modes on urban PM10 levels in two European cities using 3D clusters of backward trajectories (co-author, 2013).
- Predicting daily ragweed pollen concentrations using computational intelligence techniques over two heavily polluted areas in Europe (co-author, 2014)
- Association of allergic rhinitis or asthma with pollen and chemical pollutants in Szeged, Hungary, 1999-2007 (co-author, 2014)
- Ragweed in Eastern Europe. Invasive Species and Global Climate Change (co-author, 2014)
- A new approach used to explore associations of current Ambrosia pollen levels with current and past meteorological elements (co-author, 2015)
- Anthropogenic Air Pollution in Ancient Times. History of Toxicology and Environmental Health. Toxicology in antiquity. (2015)
- The history of ragweed in the world (co-author, 2015)
- Modelling the introduction and spread of non-native species: International trade and climate change drive ragweed invasion (co-author, 2016)
- Biogeographical estimates of allergenic pollen transport over regional scales: common ragweed and Szeged, Hungary as a test case (co-author, 2016)

== Guest editor ==
- International Journal of Environment and Pollution, Special Issue: „Air Pollution” (2007-2009).

== Member of the Editorial Board ==
- Acta Climatologica et Chorologica, Universitatis Szegediensis (1995-);
- International Journal of Biometeorology (2012);
- Annals of West University of Timişoara, Series of Biology (Timişoara, Romania, 2013-);
- Journal of Climatology (2013-);
- Archives of Otolaryngology and Rhinology (2014-);
- Science, Technology and Development (2015-);
- Journal of Natural Products Research Updates (2015-);
- Advances in Modern Oncology Research (2015-).

== Awards ==
- Széchenyi István Scholarship (2001)
- “Pro Meteorology” plaque (2002)

== See also ==
- Climatology
- List of climate scientists
- Air pollution see Further reading
