= Suzanne Anderson =

American geophysicist

Suzanne Prestrud Anderson
- Education: University of California, Berkeley; University of Washington; University of Puget Sound
- Spouse: Robert S. Anderson
- Children: 2
- Scientific career
- Institutions: University of Wyoming; Pasadena City College; University of Colorado Boulder
- Thesis: Flow paths, solute sources, weathering, and denudation rates : the chemical geomorphology of a small catchment (1995)

Suzanne Prestrud Anderson is an American geophysicist who is a professor at the University of Colorado Boulder. Her research considers chemical weathering and erosion, and how it shapes the architecture of critical zones. She is a Fellow of the Geological Society of America and the American Geophysical Union.

== Early life and education ==
Anderson was an undergraduate student in chemistry at the University of Puget Sound. The eruption of Mount St. Helens in May 1980 inspired her to study geosciences. At the University of Washington as a graduate student she was drawn to geomorphology and glaciology.. Her master's research considered frozen ground and the mechanisms responsible for sorted circles in permafrost. She moved down the West Coast for her doctoral research. She initially taught at Pasadena City College and worked in a stable isotope lab at Caltech. She studied at the University of California, Berkeley for her PhD on chemical geomorphology, working at a field site near Coos Bay. Anderson was awarded a National Science Foundation Postdoctoral Fellowship in Earth Sciences to work on glaciers and weathering at the University of Wyoming.

== Research and career ==
Anderson works on critical zone science. She was involved with the founding of the Critical Zone Exploration Network, and was principal investigator for the Boulder Creek Critical Zone Observatory from 2007-2020. In this capacity she led a broad group of researchers to study the interface between rock, air and water. Anderson co-wrote the text book Geomorphology: The Mechanics and Chemistry of Landscapes with her husband Robert S. Anderson in 2010. It was selected as a Choice Outstanding Academic Title in 2011.

== Awards and honors ==
- 2012 International Association of GeoChemistry Certificate of Recognition
- 2019 Elected Fellow of the Geological Society of America
- 2020 American Geophysical Union G.K. Gilbert Award in Surface Processes
- 2021 Elected Fellow of the American Geophysical Union

== Selected publications ==
- Suzanne Prestrud Anderson; James I Drever; Carol D Frost; Pete Holden (April 2000). "Chemical weathering in the foreland of a retreating glacier". Geochimica et Cosmochimica Acta. 64 (7): 1173–1189. Bibcode:2000GeCoA..64.1173P. doi:10.1016/S0016-7037(99)00358-0. ISSN 0016-7037. Wikidata Q59796645.
- Mark F Meier; Mark B Dyurgerov; Ursula K Rick; Shad O'neel; W Tad Pfeffer; Robert S Anderson; Suzanne P Anderson; Andrey F Glazovsky (19 July 2007). "Glaciers dominate eustatic sea-level rise in the 21st century". Science. 317 (5841): 1064–1067. doi:10.1126/SCIENCE.1143906. ISSN 0036-8075. PMID 17641167. Wikidata Q34653877.

=== Books ===
- Anderson, Robert S.; Anderson, Suzanne P. (2010). Geomorphology : the mechanics and chemistry of landscapes. Cambridge, United Kingdom. ISBN 978-0-521-51978-6. OCLC 466341136.
