= Pancheti Koteswaram =

Indian meteorologist, hydrologist

- Born: 25 March 1915; Nellore, Andhra Pradesh, India
- Died: 11 January 1997 (aged 81); Waltair, Andhra Pradesh, India
- Occupation: Meteorologist
- Years active: 1936–1997
- Known for: Meteorology; Atmospheric Physics
- Spouse: Sarojini
- Children: Four daughters and a son
- Parent(s): Subbarayulu Davar; Venkatasubbamma
- Awards: Padma Bhushan; AU Sir R. Venkitaraman Gold Medal

Pancheti Koteswaram (25 March 1915 – 11 January 1997) was an Indian meteorologist, hydrologist, atmospheric physicist and the Director-General of Observatories of Government of India. He was a professor at University of Chicago, University of Hawaii, University of Miami and Tehran University and served as a research associate at National Hurricane Research Laboratory, Miami, and the National Centre for Atmospheric Research, Colorado. A former vice-president of World Meteorological Organization (WMO), Geneva, he was an elected Fellow of the Indian Academy of Sciences, Indian National Science Academy and the Andhra Pradesh Academy of Sciences. The Government of India awarded him the third highest civilian honour of the Padma Bhushan, in 1975, for his contributions to science.

== Biography ==
Pancheti Koteswaram was born on 25 March 1915 in Nellore, a coastal Andhra Pradesh town, to Pancheti Subbarayulu Davar and Venkatasubbamma but lost his father before he turned one and was brought up amidst limited financial means, by his mother and grandmother, both widows. He completed his early education in Nellore and passed the Intermediate examination from Andhra University with first rank, winning the Sir R. Venkitaraman Gold Medal. It was during this period, he endured a tropical cyclone which hit Nellore in 1927 when he was twelve, which would, reportedly, influence his future career. He graduated in physics with honours from Presidency College, Chennai of Madras University in 1934 and started his career as a junior lecturer at Andhra-Christian College, Guntur where he worked till 1936 when he moved to Andhra University, Waltair, continuing his teaching career and simultaneously doing research in Raman Effect under the guidance of I. Ramakrishna Rao. In 1939, he secured the degree of Doctor of Science (DSc) for his thesis, Molecular association as studied by the Raman Effect, thus becoming the first non-Brahmin to receive the degree from Madras University. This was followed by two short stints lasting one year and one month each, at the Hindu College, Machilipatnam as the Head of the department of Physics and as the assistant professor at Pachaiyappa's College, Chennai. In August 1940, he joined the India Meteorological Department (I.Met.D.) as an assistant meteorologist by which time he had already published 14 articles in national and international scientific journals.

The initial years at India Meteorological Department coincided with World War II and his duties were mainly related to military operations, though he was also engaged in research on the Nor'westers that occurred regularly in Bengal area. At the department, he deputed several notable meteorologists such as Charles Normand, S. K. Banerji, the last British and the first Indian Director-Generals of the organization respectively, as well as N. K. Sul and his stint at the Cyclone Warning Centre, Kolkata assisted him in furthering his researches on cyclone warning systems. He worked at I.Met.D. till 1975, two years past his mandatory superannuation, and headed the organization as its Director-General from 1969 to 1975. In between, he had various stints abroad; as a research associate at University of Chicago (1955–56), as a senior scholar at University of Hawaii (1961), as a consultant on Tropical Cyclones at World Meteorological Organization, Tokyo (1962), as a visiting professor at the School of Environmental and Planetary Sciences of the University of Miami (1964–67), as a professor at the National Center for Atmospheric Research, Colorado (1967) and as a visiting faculty at Tehran University (1975–78).

Koteswaram married Sarojini on 20 August 1943 and the couple had four daughters and a son. After his retirement from active work, he settled in Waltair, in Andhra Pradesh and it was here he died on 11 January 1997, at the age of 82, survived by his wife and children.

== Legacy ==
=== Scientific achievements ===
The discovery of Easterly Jet Stream is one of the principal contributions of Koteswaram to metereology. He explained the phenomenon in the mid-fifties, defining it as an air current which reaches the speed of about 40m/sec during June–September periods and located near 14^{0}N with axis lying between 200-100mb (12-13 km). The discovery earned him an invitation from Herbert Riehl, the German-born US meteorologist, for joint research at the University of Chicago from 1955 to 1956 which returned new findings on the phenomenon. The duo found out that the jet stream was caused by the high levels of heat over Tibetan region and their findings assisted another German meteorologist, Hermann Flohn, in his work, besides providing a tool for predicting the Indian summer monsoon. He published his conclusions in an article, The Easterly Jet Stream over the tropics, published in Tellus A, a Swedish scientific journal in 1958.

During this period, he was also involved in research on the variability of monsoon rainfall over India, partnering S. M. A. Alvi, one of his colleagues. Their researches assisted in fixing the frequency of the monsoon variability at around two years and served as a tool in predicting the variability of monsoon in the west coast of India. Prediction of tropical cyclones was another area of his research. He was one of the early researchers in the field and did extensive research on the spiral cloud bands related to a cyclone. It was under his leadership, X-Band and S-Band Cyclone Detection Radars, six of them in the west coast and 4 in the east coast of India, were installed by the Meteorological Department getting them manufactured by the Indian firm, Bharat Electronics Limited. His researches have been published in several articles and presented at various seminars including the Inter-Regional Seminar on Tropical Cyclones of Tokyo in 1962. Besides, he also contributed to the better understanding of "hydrogen bond formation in associated liquids", "the formation of a meridional monsoon cell in the Asian summer monsoon" and the long period trends in the rainfall over the Indian west coast.

=== Other contributions ===
Koteswaram was credited with the setting up several cyclone distress mitigation committees with government, scientific community and public participation for information dissemination, planning of disaster management operations, setting up of cyclone shelters and the establishment of cyclone warning systems. He was associated with the World Meteorological Organization and served as its vice-president in 1971, the first Indian director-general to be elected to the post. The same year, when the World Meteorological Congress was held in Geneva, he was elected as the chairman of the Expert Committee which established the WMO Tropical Cyclone Project, following the UN resolution in the wake of the 1970 Bhola cyclone which devastated Bangladesh. He was also a member of the WMO Commission for Aeronautical Meteorology (CAeM) and his participation was reported in the preparation of Procedures for Air Navigations Services – Meteorology (PANS-MET). When WMO initiated the World Weather Watch program in 1961, he was associated with the initiative and under the aegis of the I.Met.D, he contributed to the program by establishing a Regional Meteorological Centre (RMC) and a Regional Telecommunication Hub (RTH) in New Delhi. He was also credited with re-designing the structure of I.Met.D on a regional basis.

Koteswaram was the author of several articles on meteorology and hydrology; his articles were published in many national and international peer-reviewed journals and were cited in several texts on the subjects. Besides, he published a book, The Upper-tropospheric and Lower-stratospheric Structure of Several Hurricanes, brought out in 1967 by the National Hurricane Research Laboratory. He was also a member of the editorial boards of several journals and was the editor of Indian Journal of Meteorology and Geophysics.

== Awards and honors ==
Koteswaram, a recipient of the Sir R. Venkitaraman Gold Medal of the Andhra University, was elected as a fellow of the Andhra Pradesh Academy of Sciences in 1972. The Indian National Science Academy elected him as its fellow in 1974, the same year as he became an elected fellow of the Indian Academy of Sciences. A year later, the Government of India included him the Republic Day Honours list for the civilian award of the Padma Bhushan for the year 1975. The Souvenir and abstracts of the International Seminar on Monsoon Meteorology and Water Resources Hydrology held at Visakhapatnam in August 1997 were published in honour of Koteswaram.

== Selected bibliography ==
- Pancheti Koteswaram, I. Ramakrishna Rao (1937). "Low and high Raman frequencies for water". Journal of Chemical Physics. 5 (8): 667. Bibcode:1937JChPh...5..667R. doi:10.1063/1.1750097. ISSN 0021-9606.
- Pancheti Koteswaram, I. Ramakrishna Rao (1938). "Constitution of Heavy Water". Nature. 141 (3564): 331–332. Bibcode:1938Natur.141..331R. doi:10.1038/141331b0. hdl:10821/1176. ISSN 0028-0836. S2CID 41275811.
- Pancheti Koteswaram, I. Ramakrishna Rao (1938). "Additional Raman frequencies for water". Philosophical Magazine. Series 7. 25 (166): 90–98. doi:10.1080/14786443808561993. ISSN 1941-5982.
- Pancheti Koteswaram, S. Gaspar (1956). "The Surface Structure of the Tropical Cyclones in the Indian Area". Ind. J. Meteor. Geophys. 7: 339–352.
- Pancheti Koteswaram (1958). "The Easterly Jet Stream over the tropics". Tellus A. 10 (1): 43–57. doi:10.1111/j.2153-3490.1958.tb01984.x. ISSN 0040-2826.
- Pancheti Koteswaram, A. C. De (1959). "Study of Pre-monsoon Thunderstorms over Gangetic West Bengal by Radar". Ind. J. Meteor. Geophys. 10: 275–282.
- Pancheti Koteswaram, A. C. De (1959). "Vertical Development of Precipitation Echoes from Cumulus Clouds near Calcutta during the Pre-monsoon season". Ind. J. Meteor. Geophys. 10: 173–178.
- Pancheti Koteswaram (1967). The Upper-tropospheric and Lower-stratospheric Structure of Several Hurricanes. National Hurricane Research Laboratory.
- Pancheti Koteswaram (1967). "On the Structure of Hurricanes in the upper Troposphere and lower Stratosphere". Monthly Weather Review. 95 (8): 541–564. Bibcode:1967MWRv...95..541K. doi:10.1175/1520-0493(1967)095<0541:otsohi>2.3.co;2. ISSN 0027-0644.

== See also ==
- India Meteorological Department
- List of climate scientists
