= Robert S. Anderson =

American geomorphologist

Robert Stewart Anderson (born November 17, 1952) is an American geomorphologist at the Institute of Arctic and Alpine Research.

Anderson graduated from Williams College in 1974 and pursued a master's and doctoral degree from Stanford University and the University of Washington, respectively. In 2006, Anderson was named a fellow of the American Geophysical Union. The University of Colorado Boulder honored Anderson with the Hazel Barnes Prize in 2014. The next year, he received the American Geophysical Union's G. K. Gilbert Award. In 2016, Anderson was appointed a CU Distinguished Professor. He is married to Suzanne Anderson, with whom he co-authored the textbook Geomorphology: the mechanics and chemistry of landscapes.
