= Susan Anderson (psychotherapist) =

American writer

Susan Anderson, LCSW is the American author of The Journey from Abandonment to Healing, a self-help book about the pain of relationship breakups. Anderson developed her ideas after her husband of eighteen years left her for another woman. Anderson was interviewed on The Early Show (CBS) on February 14, 2007 She was also interviewed on National Public Radio (NPR) Inner Visions "Overcoming Self Sabotage and Healing Abandonment" June 23, 2015.

In her book, Anderson contends that the grief of being spurned in a romantic relationship can create a trauma powerful enough "to implant an emotional drain deep within the self that if left unresolved, leeches self-esteem and creates self sabotage". Anderson adapts the five phases of grief identified in the Kübler-Ross model to relationship break-ups reshaping them as: Shattering, Withdrawal, Internalizing, Rage and Lifting.

Susan Anderson is a private practice psychotherapist in New York. She has a Masters of Liberal Studies (Stony Brook University, 1974), a Masters of Social Work (Stony Brook University, 1983), is a credentialed alcoholism and substance abuse counselor, and a member of the National Association of Social Workers. She also authored Black Swan and Taming Your Outer Child.

== Reception ==
While Kübler-Ross, Anderson, and others have attempted to define discrete stages of grief, such as an initial period of numbness leading to depression and finally to reorganization and recovery, most modern grief specialists recognize the variations and fluidity of grief experiences, that differ considerably in intensity and length among cultural groups and from person to person. No grief stage theory has been able to account for how people cope with loss, why they experience varying degrees and types of distress at different times, and how or when they adjust to a life without their loved one over time.
