= Stephen E. Schwartz =

- Born: Stephen Eugene Schwartz; June 18, 1941 (age 85); St. Louis, Mo., U.S.
- Education: A.B., Harvard; Ph.D., University of California, Berkeley
- Known for: Cloud chemistry; atmospheric aerosols; climate forcing
- Scientific career
- Fields: Atmospheric Chemistry, Climatology
- Workplaces: Stony Brook University, Brookhaven National Laboratory
- Doctoral advisor: Harold S. Johnston

Stephen E. Schwartz (born June 18, 1941) is an atmospheric scientist at Brookhaven National Laboratory. He served from 2004 to 2009 as the Chief Scientist of the Atmospheric Science Program of the United States Department of Energy. He is author of over 140 scientific publications dealing mainly with cloud chemistry and forcing of climate change by atmospheric aerosols.

== Education ==
Schwartz graduated magna cum laude from Harvard University, earned his Ph.D. from University of California, Berkeley and was a Fulbright Post-Doctoral Fellow at University of Cambridge.

== Professional ==
He is a member of a number of professional organizations and has been elected Fellow of the American Geophysical Union, Fellow of American Association for the Advancement of Science and Fellow of International Union for Pure and Applied Chemistry. He was named ISI Highly Cited researcher in 2006.

== Scientific contributions ==
=== Acid Rain ===
Schwartz was a leading scientist in the area of atmospheric sulfur and acid rain. Schwartz authored "the study some credit with spurring acid rain legislation in the 1990s." His paper "Acid deposition: Unraveling a regional phenomenon" Science 243, 753-763 (1989). was cited by the US Department of Energy in 2017 as one of 40 "Research Milestones" in the 40-year history of the Department. The citation reads in part "Schwartz's findings gave the first clear picture of the nationwide impacts of different sulfur and nitrogen sources and led to changes to the Clean Air Act."

=== Aerosol Forcing of Climate Change ===
A 1992 article authored with Robert Jay Charlson, James E. Hansen, and others provided the first global-scale estimates of radiative forcing by anthropogenic sulfate aerosol. This forcing offsets a substantial but highly uncertain fraction of forcing by incremental greenhouse gases; however the aerosol is short lived in the atmosphere, about a week, compared to the decadal to centennial residence times of greenhouse gases. This paper has been highly influential, with over 5000 citations. In 1995, as a result of this work, the journal Science named sulfate aerosol as one of nine runners-up for Molecule of the Year.
