= P. C. S. Devara =

Indian atmospheric scientist

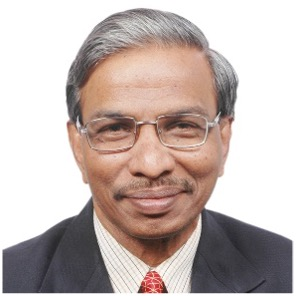
- P. C. S. Devara
- Born: Panuganti, Andhra Pradesh
- Education: Andhra University
- Known for: Atmospheric Science, Aerosol–Climate Interactions

Panuganti China Sattilingam Devara, also known as P. C. S. Devara, is an Indian atmospheric scientist and physicist. His research focuses on lidar (light radar) technology, radio and optical remote sensing, climatology, atmospheric aerosols and climate dynamics. Devara has served as President of the Indian Aerosol Science and Technology Association (IASTA).

Devara worked for over thirty-five years at the Indian Institute of Tropical Meteorology (IITM), Pune, where he led the Physical Meteorology and Aerology Division and later served as Director (Acting) and Scientific Advisor. Since 2014, he has been Director and Head of the Amity Centre of Ocean–Atmospheric Science and Technology (Amity COAST) at Amity University, Haryana (Gurugram/Manesar campus).

== Early life and education ==
Devara received his undergraduate degree with first-class honours in Physics from Andhra University. In 1974, he completed his postgraduate degree in Physics from the same university. In 1979, he received a doctoral degree in Physics from Andhra University under the guidance of Iqhbal Ahmed.

== Research and career ==
Devara's work focuses on atmospheric optics, radiation, and remote sensing, including the characterization of atmospheric aerosols and trace gases, and their influence on weather and climate processes. He has contributed to the development of optical and radar remote sensing techniques for studying aerosols, trace gases, and state variables in the troposphere and lower stratosphere.

In 1979, Devara received a Young Scientist Award from the Government of Andhra Pradesh Akademi of Sciences. He joined IITM in 1980 as Senior Scientific Officer and became Head of the Physical Meteorology and Aerology Division. In 2005, he became Acting Director of IITM and served as Scientific Advisor until 2014.

In 2014, Devara joined Amity University, Haryana as Director and Head of the Amity Centre of Ocean–Atmospheric Science and Technology (ACOAST). He also heads related centres including the Amity Centre for Environmental Science and Health and the Amity Centre for Air Pollution Control. His research at Amity focuses on aerosol–cloud–climate interactions, black carbon dynamics, air pollution monitoring, and satellite-ground data integration for climate and health impact assessments.

Devara led collaborative projects with NASA, (AERONET–MAIA program), IITM Pune, and Emory University (USA) on satellite calibration/validation and PM_{2.5} health mapping. His recent publications include a 2024 study in Heliyon on black carbon aerosol synthesis over rural Haryana.

During the Odd-Even Campaign in New Delhi (2016), Devara led a team from Amity University in collaboration with ARIES, Nainital and IITM-Delhi to assess the policy's impact on regional air quality.

== Awards and recognition ==
- Fellow of the Asian Aerosol Research Assembly (AARA), 2015.
- Fellow of the Andhra Pradesh Akademi of Sciences (APAS), Hyderabad.
- Fellow of the Society of Earth Scientists (SES), India.
- Fellow of the Maharashtra Academy of Sciences (MASc).
- President of the Indian Aerosol Science and Technology Association (IASTA), 2008–2023.
- Golden Jubilee and Silver Jubilee Awards, IITM, Pune.
- “Asia’s Top-50 Scientist Award”, 2022.
- “Kalam Research Award”, 2023.
