= M. Levent Kurnaz =

Turkish Climate Scientist

- Born: 1965 (age 60–61)
- Education: B.S. Electrical Eng., Bogazici University (1988), B.S. Physics, Bogazici University, (1990), B.A. International Relations, Anadolu University (2015), M.S. Electrical Eng., Bogazici University (1990), M.S. Physics, University of Pittsburgh (1991), Ph.D. Physics, University of Pittsburgh (1994).
- Occupations: Academic, Climate Scientist

M. Levent Kurnaz (born 1965) is a Turkish climate scientist, Boğaziçi University Physics Department Faculty Member, and Director of the Center for Climate Change and Policy Studies (iklimBU).

== Academic life ==
Kurnaz works as a professor in the Physics Department at Boğaziçi University. In 2014, he founded Boğaziçi University Center for Climate Change and Policy Studies (iklimBU). Kurnaz is the director and iklimBU contributes to the regions of Central Asia, Middle East North Africa (MENA), and Australasia for the International Coordinated Regional Climate Downscaling Experiment (CORDEX) led by the World Climate Research Programme. He is the founding co-chair, and board member of United Nations Sustainable Development Solutions Network (UN SDSN) Turkey. His scientific studies are mainly on climate science and sustainability

== Other activities ==
Kurnaz has spoken at various international and national meetings and organisations, such as the Social Good Summit and TEDx Talks, and made a substantial impact outside academia particularly to increase the awareness of Climate change in Turkey. Kurnaz has been much quoted by national media, such as Anadolu Agency and Hürriyet.

== Corporate boards and non-profit organizations ==
- UN SDSN Turkey Founding Co-chair, Board Member
- Future Earth MENA Regional Advisory Committee Member

== Selected publications ==
=== Books ===
- “Son Buzul Erimeden” (Before the Last Glacier Melts), M. L. Kurnaz, Dogan Kitap (2019). ISBN 978-605-09-6611-4

=== Scientific Articles ===
- Spinoni, J., Barbosa, P., Bucchignani, E., Cassano, J., Cavazos, T., Cescatti, A., ... Dosio, A. (2021). Global exposure of population and land-use to meteorological droughts under different warming levels and SSPs: A CORDEX-based study. International Journal of Climatology, 41(15), 6825–6853. https://doi.org/10.1002/joc.7302
- Spinoni, J., Barbosa, P., Bucchignani, E., Cassano, J., Cavazos, T., Christensen, J. H., ... Dosio, A. (2020). Future global meteorological drought hot spots: A study based on CORDEX data. Journal of Climate, 33(9), 3635–3661. https://doi.org/10.1175/JCLI-D-19-0084.1
- Ozturk, T., Turp, M. T., Türkeş, M., & Kurnaz, M. L. (2017). Projected changes in temperature and precipitation climatology of Central Asia CORDEX Region 8 by using RegCM4.3.5. Atmospheric Research, 183, 296–307. https://doi.org/10.1016/j.atmosres.2016.09.008
- Ozturk, T., Ceber, Z. P., Türkeş, M., & Kurnaz, M. L. (2015). Projections of climate change in the Mediterranean Basin by using downscaled global climate model outputs. International Journal of Climatology, 35(14), 4276–4292. https://doi.org/10.1002/joc.4285
