= Richard A. Betts =

British climate scientist

Richard Arthur Betts MBE FRMetS
- Occupations: Climate scientist

Richard Arthur Betts is a British climate scientist who is Head of the Climate Impacts strategic area at the Met Office Hadley Centre in Exeter, United Kingdom. He is also chair in Climate Impacts at the University of Exeter and the Principal Investigator of the EU FP7 project HELIX (High-End cLimate Impacts and eXtremes). He was a lead author for Working Group I and a contributing author for Working Group II of the IPCC Fourth Assessment Report. He was a lead author for Working Group II of the IPCC Fifth Assessment Report. He is an editor for the International Journal of Global Warming, the Journal of Environmental Investing, and for Earth System Dynamics. He was appointed MBE in the 2019 Birthday Honours.

After studying physics at the University of Bristol, Betts switched to meteorology at the University of Birmingham and then studied for a doctorate in meteorology at the University of Reading. He is noted for engaging with critics of climate science on Twitter and was selected by TIME as one of the 140 best Twitter feeds of 2012. He was awarded the 2019 Climate Science Communications Award by the Royal Meteorological Society.
