= Danielle Claar =

Marine scientist

- Education: University of Hawaii at Hilo, University of Victoria in Canada
- Scientific career
- Fields: Marine Science
- Thesis: Coral Symbioses Under Stress: Spatial and Temporal Dynamics of Coral-Symbiodinium Interactions (2018)
- Website: https://danielleclaar.weebly.com/

Danielle Claar is a marine scientist whose research has covered the effect of the 2015/2016 El Niño event on coral symbionts and parasites.

== Life ==
She studied for an undergraduate degree at the University of Hawaii at Hilo, before completing a PhD at the University of Victoria in Canada. After her PhD Claar joined the Wood Lab at the University of Washington in Seattle as a NOAA Climate and Global Change Postdoctoral Fellow.

Claar studied an undergraduate degree in Marine Science at the University of Hawaii in Hilo. In 2011, during her undergraduate studies, Claar undertook a NOAA Hollings Undergraduate Scholarship at Kasitsna Bay Laboratory in Alaska. She then went on to complete PhD studies from 2013-2018 at University of Victoria in Canada concerned coral symbiosis during the 2015/2016 El Niño event. Her thesis "Coral Symbioses Under Stress: Spatial and Temporal Dynamics of Coral-Symbiodinium Interactions" earned her the Canadian Governor General's gold medal for academic excellence. During her doctoral study Claar made use of her training as a scientific diver to complete field work on the island of Kiritimati in the Pacific Ocean.

== Work ==
After her PhD, Claar took up a NOAA Climate and Global Change (C&GC) Postdoctoral Fellowship to study "Large-scale climatic drivers of parasitism in coral reef fishes" at the University of Washington, Seattle.

== See also ==
- 2014–16 El Niño event
- Coral in Climate Research
- Effect of Climate Change on coral
- Coral bleaching
