= Fritz Möller =

Fritz Möller (16 May 1906, in Rudolstadt – 21 March 1983, in Munich) was a German meteorologist, geophysicist and high school teacher. He was a pioneer in radiation research and satellite meteorology.

== Life ==
Möller's eponymous father was the director of the hospital in Rudolstadt. Möller received a degree in Geophysics and Meteorology at the University of Göttingen in 1924 and joined the Corps Thuringia Jena that same year. In 1925 he attended the Johann Wolfgang Goethe University, Frankfurt am Main, receiving his doctorate in 1928. From 1934, he worked as a meteorologist at the Frankfurt airport, and then in the new Reich Office Weather Service from 1935 to 1938. After 1938 he taught at the University of Frankfurt and the University of Leipzig.

== Mainz and Munich ==
The new University of Mainz appointed Möller a professor in 1948. This institute was instrumental in international radiation research. Until retirement in 1972, he headed the Meteorological Institute and the Institute of Meteorology and Climatology in Munich. In 1962, he was appointed Chair for Theoretical Meteorology.

== Climate modeling ==
With the introduction of the computer, meteorologists in the United States began numerical experiments to develop quantitative measurement methods to study circulation and climate of the earth. In 1959 and 1960, Möller came to the United States to work with Syukuro Manabe on the numerical determination of radiative fluxes. Möller's second visit to the United States was the evaluation of measurement data from meteorological satellites. He was the only German belonging to the governing body of the Global Atmospheric Research Program.

In 1963, he published a paper in the Journal of Geophysical Research which purported to disprove Gilbert Plass's influential 1953 article on the warming influence of industrial carbon dioxide. Although his model of carbon dioxide-water vapor feedback produced inconsistent results because it ignored certain physical processes such as atmospheric convection, he encouraged other researchers (notably Manabe and Wetherald in 1967) to develop more reliable climate models.

== Honors ==
- Honorary doctorate from the University of Mainz
- Member of the German Academy of Sciences Leopoldina (1959)
- President of the International Association for Meteorology and Atmospheric Physics (IAMAP) (1959-1967)
- Member of the Bavarian Academy of Sciences (1962)
