= Laure Zanna =

American researcher

- לור זאנה
- Born: Laure E. Zanna
- Education: Tel Aviv University (BSc); Weizmann Institute of Science (MSc); Harvard University (PhD)
- Scientific career
- Workplaces: Harvard University; University of Oxford; New York University
- Thesis: Optimal excitation of Atlantic Ocean variability and implications for predictability (2009)
- Website: zanna-researchteam.github.io/author/laure-zanna/

Laure E. Zanna (Hebrew: לור זאנה) is a Climate Scientist and the Joseph B. Keller and Herbert B. Keller Professor of Applied Mathematics at the Courant Institute of Mathematical Sciences, New York University. She works on topics including climate system dynamics, the influence of the oceans on global scales, data science, and machine learning. In July 2019 she was awarded the Nicholas P. Fofonoff Award for Early Career Research by the American Meteorological Society for "exceptional creativity in the development and application of new concepts in ocean and climate dynamics." She is the lead principal investigator of the NSF-NOAA Climate Process Team on Ocean Transport and Eddy Energy, and she is also the lead investigator of an international effort to improve climate models with scientific machine learning called M^{2}LInES.

== Early life and education ==
Zanna studied atmospheric physics at Tel Aviv University and graduated in 2001. She earned a Master's degree in environmental sciences in 2003 at the Weizmann Institute of Science and a PhD in Climate Dynamics in 2009 at Harvard University. Her dissertation looked at Atlantic Ocean circulation, and her PhD advisor was Eli Tziperman. As a young researcher she was awarded the European Geosciences Union Outstanding Poster Paper Award for her work on non-normal dynamics of thermohaline circulation. She developed a model that could visualise thermohaline circulation.

== Research and career ==
Zanna was appointed as a Junior Research Fellow at Balliol College, Oxford in 2009. She was appointed to the Oxford Martin School and made an Associate Professor in Physics at the University of Oxford in 2011. She was made a Fellow of St Cross College, Oxford in 2011. There she worked on Meridional Overturning Circulation anomalies. She was a lecturer at Christ Church, Oxford from 2014 to 2018, when she was appointed as a David Richards Fellow at Wadham College, Oxford. She moved to become a Professor in Mathematics & Atmosphere/Ocean Science at the Courant Institute of Mathematical Sciences, New York University, in 2019.

Her work applies mathematical models to ocean data. By understanding how ocean heat has changed in the past, Zanna's work help make more accurate predictions about climate change.

Zanna's research has included using Green's function methods to relate observations of sea surface temperatures to the temperatures of the deep ocean. By using an ocean transport model, Zanna demonstrated that temperature could be treated as a passive variable that did not impact circulation. She demonstrated that atmospheric heat is mainly stored in the deep sea, with oceans storing up to 93% of the heat of climate change. Specifically, the models developed by Zanna and her group showed that the deep oceans have absorbed 436 zettajoules of energy in the past 150 years. This represents around 1,000 times the worldwide human energy consumption, or 1.5 atomic bombs every second for 150 years. She also found that major ocean currents that transport nutrients and heat are changing.

Her group demonstrated that it is possible to use deep learning and sub-grid parametrisation to analyse ocean data.

In 2022, Zanna was principal lecturer at the Geophysical Fluid Dynamics Program at Woods Hole Oceanographic Institution, where the topic was "Data-Driven GFD".
