= Betsy Weatherhead =

American climatologist

Elizabeth C. Weatherhead, more commonly known as Betsy Weatherhead, is an American climatologist, atmospheric scientist, government official, and professor. She was appointed in 2020 by United States president Donald Trump to head the National Climate Assessment (NCA).

== Biography ==
Before working for the United States government, Weatherhead worked in the private sector for Jupiter Intelligence. At the University of Colorado and Cooperative Institute for Research in Environmental Sciences, she studied climate change in the Arctic and climate forecast modeling.

Trump's successor Joe Biden removed Weatherhead from the position in April 2021, replacing her with Allison Crimmins. In the House of Representatives, two Republicans questioned why the Biden administration removed her from her role overseeing the NCA, alleging that her removal was politically motivated.

== See also ==
- Politicization of science
