= Vicky Pope =

British scientist

Vicky Pope is a scientist and the former head of the climate predictions programme at the Hadley Centre.

== Biography ==
Pope attended North London Collegiate School. She joined the Met Office in the 1980s and went on to complete a PhD in Meteorology at the University of Reading.

She spent 6 years as manager of atmospheric climate model development and evaluation. She became a senior manager of the climate research programme for a number of UK Government departments in 2002. Since October 2004 she was Head of the Climate Prediction Programme which provides independent scientific advice on climate change. Her research interests include developing and validating climate models.

She is a professor at Gresham College, and an honorary professor at University College London.

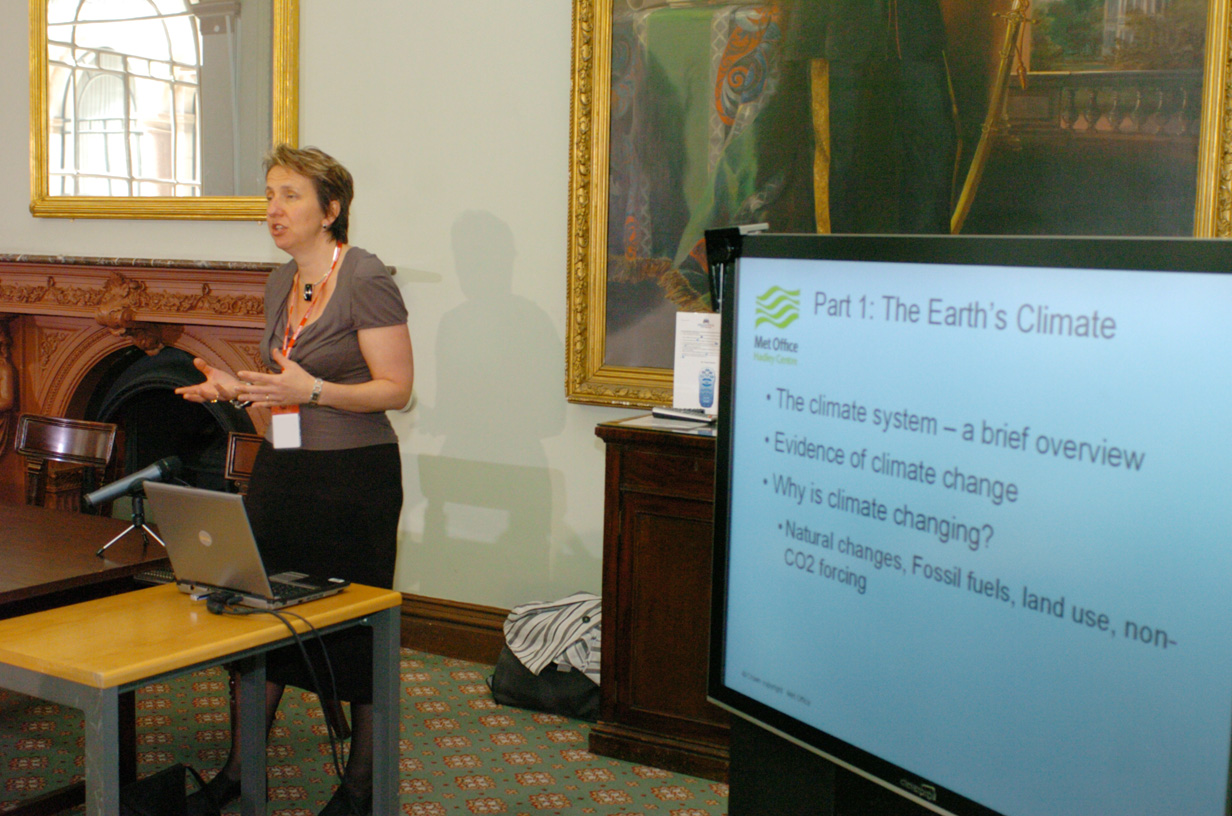

In an article for The Guardian newspaper, she wrote: "Having to rein in extraordinary claims that the latest extreme event is all due to climate change is at best hugely frustrating and at worse enormously distracting. Overplaying natural variations in the weather as climate change is just as much a distortion of science as underplaying them to claim that climate change has stopped or is not happening."

She added: "Both undermine the basic facts that the implications of climate change are profound and will be severe if greenhouse gas emissions are not cut drastically."

== Publications ==
- Valdes, Paul; et al. (2017). "The BRIDGE family of climate models: HadCM3@Bristol v1.0". Geosci. Model Dev. 10 (10): 3715–3743. doi:10.5194/gmd-10-3715-2017. hdl:10871/40153.
- Pope, Vicky; et al. (15 November 2007). "The Met Office Hadley Centre climate modelling capability: The competing requirements for improved resolution, complexity and dealing with uncertainty". Philosophical Transactions of the Royal Society A: Mathematical, Physical and Engineering Sciences. 365 (1860): 2635–265. Bibcode:2007RSPTA.365.2635P. doi:10.1098/rsta.2007.2087. PMID 17666385. S2CID 303390.
- Led the Met Office Hadley Centre contribution of climate science to the Stern review: the Economics of Climate Change.
- Martin, Gill; et al. (2005). "The physical properties of the atmosphere in the new Hadley Centre Global Environmental Model, HadGEM1 Part I: Model description and global climatology". J. Clim. 19 (7): 1274–1301. Bibcode:2006JCli...19.1274M. doi:10.1175/JCLI3636.1.
- http://www.oxonia.org/WE%201-8/WE_1-8_article11.html
- Pope, Vicky; Davies, Terry (September–October 2002). "Testing and Evaluating Atmospheric Climate Models". Computing in Science and Engineering. 4 (5): 64–69. Bibcode:2002CSE.....4e..64P. doi:10.1109/MCISE.2002.1032431.
- Inness, P.M.; Slingo, J.M.; Woolnough, S.J.; Neale, R.B.; Pope, V.D. (2001). "Organization of tropical convection in a GCM with varying vertical resolution; implications for the simulation of the Madden-Julian Oscillation". Climate Dynamics. 17 (1): 777–793. Bibcode:2001ClDy...17..777I. doi:10.1007/s003820000148. S2CID 129356626.
- Pope, V.D.; Gallani, M.L.; Rowntree, P.R.; Stratton, R.A. (2000). "The impact of new physical parametrizations in the Hadley Centre climate model: HadAM3". Climate Dynamics. 16 (2–3): 123–146. Bibcode:2000ClDy...16..123P. doi:10.1007/s003820050009. S2CID 129848975.
- Lahoz, WA; O'Neill, A.; Heaps, A.; Pope, V.D.; Swinbank, R.; Harwood, R.S.; Froidevaux, L.; Read, W.G.; Waters, J.W.; Peckham, G.E. (1996). "Vortex dynamics and the evolution of water vapour in the stratosphere of the southern hemisphere". Quarterly Journal of the Royal Meteorological Society. 122 (530): 423–450. Bibcode:1996QJRMS.122..423L. doi:10.1002/qj.49712253007.
- O'Neill, A.; Grose, W.L.; Pope, V.D.; MacLean, H.; Swinbank, R. (October 1994). "Evolution of the Stratosphere during Northern Winter 1991/92 as Diagnosed from U.K. Meteorological Office Analyses". Journal of the Atmospheric Sciences. 51 (20): 2800–17. Bibcode:1994JAtS...51.2800O. doi:10.1175/1520-0469(1994)051<2800:EOTSDN>2.0.CO;2.
- O'Neill, A.; Pope, V.D. (1988). "Simulations of linear and nonlinear disturbances in the stratosphere". Quarterly Journal of the Royal Meteorological Society. 114 (482): 1063–1110. Bibcode:1988QJRMS.114.1063O. doi:10.1002/qj.49711448210.
- Mechoso, C.R.; O'Neill, A.; Pope, V.D.; Farrara, J.D. (1988). "A study of the stratospheric final warming of 1982 in the southern hemisphere". Quarterly Journal of the Royal Meteorological Society. 114 (484): 1365–84. Bibcode:1988QJRMS.114.1365M. doi:10.1002/qj.49711448402.
- Bailey, M.J.; O'Neill, A.; Pope, V.D. (1993). "Stratospheric Analyses Produced by the United Kingdom Meteorological Office". Journal of Applied Meteorology. 32 (9): 1472–83. Bibcode:1993JApMe..32.1472B. doi:10.1175/1520-0450(1993)032<1472:SAPBTU>2.0.CO;2.
- Sun and superstorms: Our changing climate. (2016) Chapter for The Earth and I: a book of essays edited by James Lovelock

=== Selected newspaper and web articles 2007-2013 ===
- Models 'key to climate forecasts'. BBC
- Climate change, the real facts, The Sun newspaper
- Scientists must rein in misleading claims, Guardian
- Research is robust but communication is weak, The Times
- How science will shape climate adaptation plans, The Guardian
- Are climate data and evidence important? World Bank blog
- Brochures on climate science for visitors to the UNFCCC climate conferences and interested stakeholders, 2005-2010
