= Tom Segalstad =

Norwegian geologist

Tom Victor Segalstad (born 1949) is a Norwegian geologist. He has taught geology and geophysics at the University of Oslo, Norway, and at Pennsylvania State University, United States.

== Career ==
=== Positions ===
He is the past head of the Geological Museum at the University of Oslo (a position he held for 12 years) and the past head of the Natural History Museums and Botanical Garden of the University of Oslo.

He currently holds a position as associate professor of the largest university in Norway, UiO, University of Oslo, in Resource and Environmental Geology.

In 2008, he served as one of two conveners for the "Metallogeny of the Arctic Region" symposium at the 33rd International Geological Congress.

=== Climate change ===
Segalstad was a reviewer of the IPCC Third Assessment Report, acting as one out of sixteen reviewers from Norway in Working Group 1 of the IPCC but disagreed with the Scientific consensus on climate change from the assessment. He believes that human-released carbon dioxide (CO_{2}) won't have a large effect on the Earth's climate, claiming that it produces only a small percentage of the greenhouse effect, and that most CO_{2} would be absorbed by the ocean through geological processes. According to his own account, after the results of the assessment were published, he resigned from the IPCC.

He explained later in regards to the report that the summary of the report had been released first, which attracted a large amount of media attention. He then claimed that the leader of the team making the IPCC report then stated that the information in the report had to match what had been stated in the summary, even though the summary had been written by government representatives and members of environmental organizations, not by scientists in the field of study.

He was one of 100 signatories of a letter directed to the Secretary-General of the United Nations Ban Ki-moon describing the perceived mistakes in how the IPCC report was made.

== Criticism ==
Researchers Richard Bellerby, Are Olsen, and Gisle Nondal wrote a series of articles in Norwegian newspaper Forskning about Segalstad's stated beliefs and research on human CO_{2} emissions and how they do not affect climate change. The researchers went through Segalstad's points and gave counterarguments, concluding that he had used "incorrect interpretations of laws and geochemical data, in addition to a complete neglect of published measurements". They also repeatedly mentioned that Segalstad has yet to publish his CO_{2} research in any "recognized scientific journal".

== Articles ==
- “The distribution of CO2 between atmosphere, hydrosphere, and lithosphere; minimal influence from anthropogenic CO2 on the global 'Greenhouse Effect'” (PDF). Published 1996 In Emsley, J. (Ed.): The Global Warming Debate. The Report of the European Science and Environment Forum. Bourne Press Ltd., Bournemouth, Dorset, U.K., pp. 41–50.
- “Carbon cycle modelling and the residence time of natural and anthropogenic atmospheric CO2: on the construction of the 'Greenhouse Effect Global Warming' dogma” (PDF). Published 1998: In Bate, R. (Ed.): Global warming: the continuing debate. ESEF, Cambridge, U.K., pp. 184–219.
- Jaworowski, Z.P., Segalstad, Tom Victor; Ono, N. “Do glaciers tell a true atmospheric CO2 story?” (PDF), Science of the Total Environment, August 199, Volume 114. p. 227-284.
- Singer, S.F., Segalstad, Tom Victor. “Nature, not human activity, rules the climate”(PDF), Chicago, USA.: The Heartland Institute. 2008 40 p.
- Solomon, L., Segalstad, Tom Victor. “The Deniers. The world-renowned scientists who stood up against global warming hysteria, political persecution, and fraud — and those who are too fearful to do so.” USA.: Richard Vigilante Books. 2008, 8 p.
- Jaworowski, Z.P., Segalstad, Tom Victor; Hisdal, V. “Atmospheric CO2 and global warming: a critical review.” Second Revised Edition. Meddelelser / Norsk polarinstitutt 1992 (119)
- Jaworowski, Z.P., Segalstad, Tom Victor; Hisdal, V. Atmospheric CO_{2} and global warming: a critical review. Rapportserie 1990 (59).
- Segalstad, Tom Victor. Commentary: “The Construction of Dogmas in Climate Science.” European Committee For a Constructive Tomorrow (CFACT Europe). 2006 1 p.

== See also ==
- Global warming controversy
