= Early Career Award =

An Early Career Award is an award recognizing individuals for notable contributions to their fields, companies, or organizations towards the beginning of an individual's career. Early Career Awards are typically bestowed on recipients early in their careers, as opposed to Distinguished Career Awards, which recognize contributions later in an individual's career.

== See also ==
- American Public Health Association
- List of early career awards
- Presidential Early Career Award for Scientists and Engineers
