= Mark Dyurgerov =

Russian glaciologist

Mark Borisovitch Dyurgerov (13 September 1944 – 5 September 2009) was an internationally known glaciologist and Fellow of the Institute of Arctic and Alpine Research (INSTAAR) of the University of Colorado at Boulder. He was born in Moscow, Russia; both of his parents were engineers, and his mother was also a Russian poet.

Dyurgerov was educated at Moscow State University, where he received his BS and PhD degrees in 1970 and 1974. His mentor was glaciologist Petr Shumsky. He was introduced to the high mountains by Misha Plam, who later came to Boulder to direct INSTAAR's Mountain Research Station. In 1990 Dyurgerov received the higher degree of Doctor of Science from the Institute of Geography of the Russian Academy of Science, and in 1992 was awarded the title Professor of Hydrology and Water Resources by the Russian Academy.

Dyurgerov went with Shumsky to Antarctica, where he overwintered twice. He conducted glaciological studies in many of the high mountains of Asia and climbed Peak Communism (7,495 m; 24,590 ft, now renamed Ismoil Somoni Peak) in 1977, the highest mountain in the former Soviet Union. Dyurgerov conducted glaciological research for more than 21 days on the Pamir Glacier Plateau at elevations of 5,900–6,500 m (19,400–21,300 ft) without descending. At that time it was a record for a scientist working for so long at such a high elevation.

Dyurgerov came to the United States in 1995 to work with American glaciologists in Boulder, Colorado. He became an American citizen in 2003. He continued his work as a Research Scientist and Fellow of INSTAAR, and collaborated with personnel at the National Snow and Ice Data Center, as well as with other local scientists and graduate students and colleagues around the world. Dyurgerov's closest colleagues were Mark Meier and W. Tad Pfeffer at INSTAAR, and David Bahr (now at Regis University). They helped Dyurgerov quickly integrate in the American glaciological community and feel at home in the U.S. In 2004, he received a fellowship from the Jet Propulsion Laboratory in Pasadena, CA, and in 2006-07 he was in Stockholm as a recipient of a prestigious Marie Curie Fellowship. At the time of his death, he had published over 120 scientific papers, including two in 2009, in the fields of glacier monitoring, causes of sea-level rise, methods of mass balance and runoff study, and all aspects of glaciers in relation to climate change and meltwater production. Until his last hours, he was working on a major compendium that he was planning to publish in Moscow as an issue of "Materials of Glaciological Research." The best known of Dyurgerov‘a contributions to the scientific literature are his several global compilations and syntheses of glacier mass balance. His results figured in the climate-change and sea-level sections of the Intergovernmental Panel on Climate Change reports, which received the Nobel Peace Prize in 2007.

== Selected publications ==
Dyurgerov, Mark; Meier, Mark F.; Bahr, David B. (2009). "A new index of glacier area change: A tool for glacier monitoring". Journal of Glaciology. 55 (192): 710. Bibcode:2009JGlac..55..710D. doi:10.3189/002214309789471030.

Dyrugerov, M. B. and Meier, M. F. (2005): Glaciers and the changing earth system: a 2004 snapshot. Institute of Arctic and Alpine Research, University of Colorado. Occasional paper No. 58, 117 pp. http://instaar.colorado.edu/uploads/occasional-papers/OP58_dyurgerov_meier.pdf

Dyurgerov, M. B., 2002: Glacier Mass Balance and Regime: Data of Measurements and Analysis. Institute of Arctic and Alpine Research, University of Colorado. Occasional paper, 275 pp. http://instaar.colorado.edu/other/occ_papers.html

Meier M. F. and M. B. Dyurgerov, 2002: How Alaska Affects the World. Science, 297 (5580), 350–351.

Meier, M. F., M. B. Dyurgerov, and G. J. McCabe. 2002. The Health of Glaciers...Recent Changes in Glacier Regime. Climate Change, Kluwer (in Press).

Dyurgerov, M. B. and Dwyer, J. D., 2001: The steepening of glacier mass balance gradients with northern hemisphere warming. Zeitschrift fur Gletscherkunde und Glazialgeologie, 36 (2000), s. 107–118.

Dyurgerov, M. B., Meier., M. F., 2000: Twentieth century climate change: evidence from small glaciers. Proceedings of the National Academy of Sciences, USA, 97(4) 1406–1411.

McCabe, G.J., Fountain, A.G. and Dyurgerov, M. B., 2000: Variability of winter mass balance of Northern Hemisphere glaciers and relations with atmospheric circulation. Arctic, Antarctic, and Alpine Research 32, 64–72.

Serreze, M. C., Walsh, J. E., Chapin III, F. S., Osterkamp, T., Dyurgerov, M. B., Romanovsky, V., Oechel, W. C., Morison, J., Zhang, T. and Barry, R. G., 2000: Observational evidence of recent change in the northern high-latitude environment. Climate Change, 46, 159–207.

Dyurgerov, M. B., Meier, M. F., 1999: Analysis of winter and summer glacier mass balances. Geografiska Annaler. 81A(4), 541–554.

Dyurgerov, M. B. and Bahr, D. B., 1998: Correlation's Between Glacier Properties - Finding appropriate parameters for global glacier monitoring, Journal of Glaciology, 45 (149) 9–16.

Bahr, D. B. and Dyurgerov, M. B., 1998: Characteristic mass-balance scaling with valley glacier size. Journal of Glaciology, 45(149), 17–21.

Dyurgerov, M. B. and Meier, M. F.: 1997a: Mass balance of mountain and subpolar glaciers: a new global assessment for 1961–1990. Arctic and Alpine Research 29(4), 379–391.

Dyurgerov, M. B. and Meier, M. F., 1997b: Year-to-year fluctuation of global mass balance of small glaciers and their contribution to sea level changes. Arctic and Alpine Research 29(4), 392–401.
