= Allison Crimmins =

American climatologist

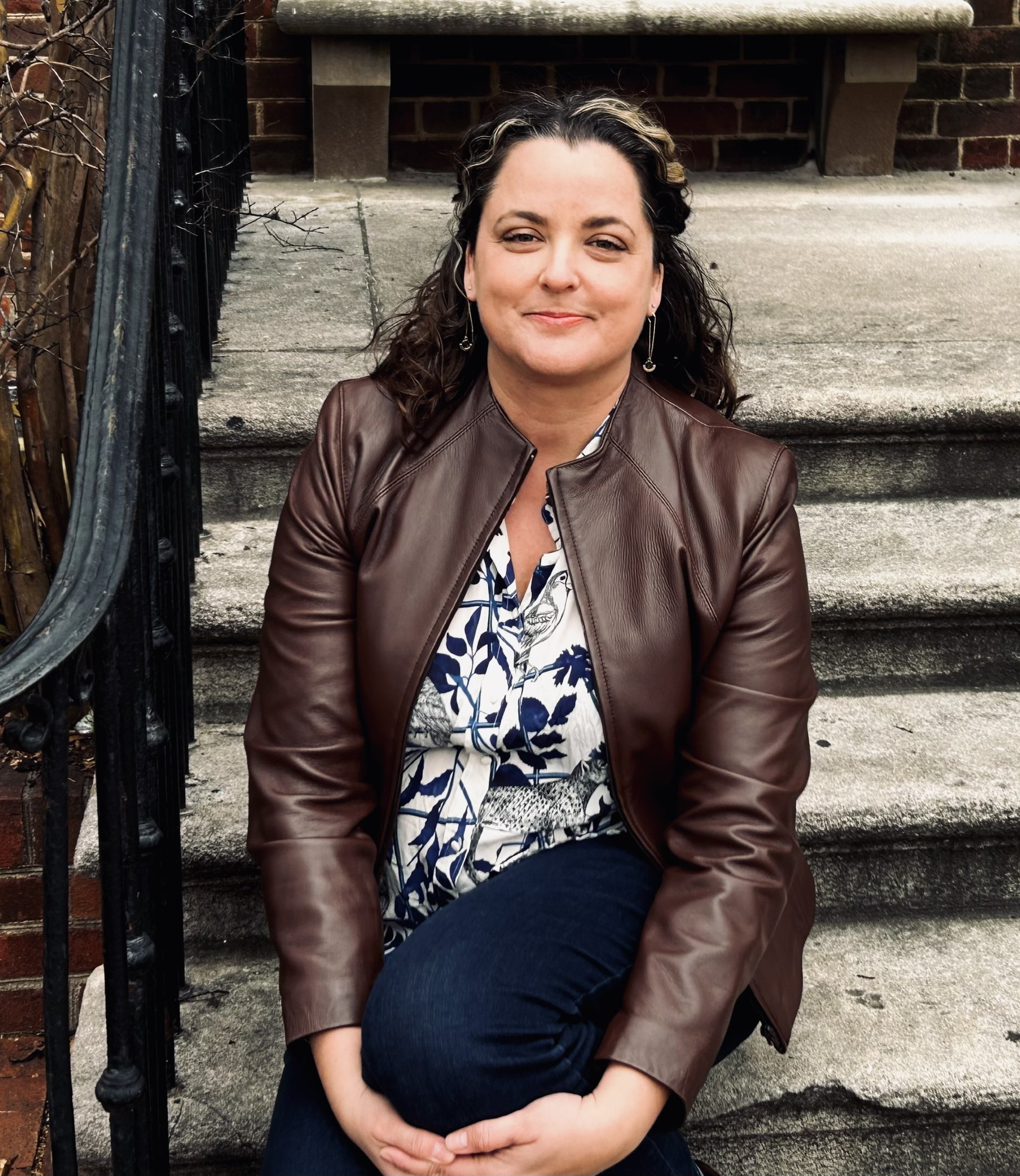

Allison Crimmins is an American climate scientist. Her expertise includes scientific assessments of climate change, including impacts to the economy and human health, and opportunities for positive outcomes. She has a background in government work as the director of the National Climate Assessment in the United States since 2021. She was appointed by President Joe Biden, and replaced Trump appointee Betsy Weatherhead.

== Early life and education ==
Crimmins was born in South Bend, Indiana. Crimmins earned her Bachelor of Science in environmental biology in the Lyman Briggs college at Michigan State University. She was a member of Michigan State’s Honors College and women’s water polo team. She has a Master of Science in oceanography and marine science from San Francisco State University and was advised by Dr. Kenneth Coale for her thesis focusing on paleoclimatology in Monterey Bay. She earned a second master's degree, in public policy international and global affairs, from the Harvard Kennedy School where she worked with Robert Stavins.

== Government work ==
Crimmins is currently the executive director of the Industry Proving Grounds program at the National Oceanic and Atmospheric Administration (NOAA), where she has been since November 2024. Through this work, she establishes the vision for improving delivery of NOAA climate data and services to U.S. industries and enhances broad use of NOAA's trusted and authoritative weather and climate information. From 2021 to 2024 Crimmins was the director of the Fifth National Climate Assessment at the U.S. Global Change Research Program and the White House Office of Science and Technology Policy. As director, Crimmins oversaw development and delivery of the 5th National Climate Assessment (NCA5). As director, she set the goals and strategic vision for the assessment, oversaw the extensive collaborations required to make the assessment effective, and served as the chair of the Federal Steering Committee which, at the time, represented the 14 federal agencies of the U.S. Global Change Research Program.

Crimmins also served as an environmental scientist in 2011, and later science coordinator at the Office of Air and Radiation at the Environmental Protection Agency. In those capacities she worked on policy and rulemaking, including work on the Endangerment Finding and the Clean Power Plan. She also co-authored the EPA’s Climate Change Impacts and Risk Analysis (CIRA). She worked to help implement projects funded by the Inflation Reduction Act and the Justice 40 program. While at EPA, Crimmins also served as an author on the Human Health chapter of the Fourth National Climate Assessment and lead author of USGCRP’s 2016 Climate and Health Assessment.

== Other work ==
Crimmins has published a number of essays focusing on climate change and policy. In 2020, she called for the United States to have a "Department of Climate" to deal with climate change. She has appeared on many podcasts highlighting her climate work. Crimmins also served as the director of strategy for Remedy Plan, a biotech company aimed at using non-toxic drugs to aid in cancer treatment.
