= Imbrie =

Imbrie is a surname. Notable people with the surname include:

- Andrew Imbrie (1921–2007), American classical composer
- John Imbrie (1925–2016), American oceanographer
- William Imbrie (1845–1928), American missionary

== See also ==
- Imbrie Farm, historic farmstead in Hillsboro, Oregon
