= Amaelle Landais-Israël =

French physicist and climatologist (born 1977)

- Born: 27 July 1977 (age 49); Le Mans, France
- Education: Doctorat d'Océanologie, Météorologie et Environnement à l'UPMC Ingénieur de l'ESPCI Paris
- Awards: Médaille d'argent du CNRS (2024) Médaille Sir Nicholas Shackleton de l'INQUA (2017) Médaille de bronze du CNRS (2011) Prix Etienne Roth du CEA, décerné par l'Académie des sciences (2011)
- Scientific career
- Fields: Glaciology, climatology
- Workplaces: CNRS, Laboratoire des Sciences du Climat et de l'Environnement
- Doctoral advisors: Jean Jouzel, Valérie Masson-Delmotte
- Website: Official website

Amaelle Landais-Israël (born 27 July 1977) is a French glaciologist and climatologist. She is research director of the Laboratory of Climate and Environmental Sciences (LSCE) at the French National Centre for Scientific Research (CNRS).

== Life ==
Landais-Israël graduated from ESPCI Paris in 2000. In 2004, she finished her doctorate in oceanology, meteorology and the environment, supervised by Jean Jouzel and Valérie Masson-Delmotte. Entitled La variabilité climatique rapide en atlantique nord: l'apport des isotopes de l'air piégé dans la glace du Groenland it explored how atmospheric isotopes trapped in Greenland ice could be used to study rapid variations in the climate of the North Atlantic.

From 2004 to 2006, she did post-doctorate study at the Hebrew University of Jerusalem. In 2007, she was appointed research fellow at CNRS, and became research director at CNRS in 2016.
