= Françoise Vimeux =

French climatologist

Françoise Vimeux is a French climatologist. She is Director of Research at the Institut de recherche pour le développement (IRD), works at the Laboratoire des sciences du climat et de l'environnement (LSCE) and at the Laboratoire HydroSciences Montpellier (HSM).

== Biography ==
=== Education ===
Françoise Vimeux graduated in 1999 with a Doctorate from the Université Paris 7 - Denis Diderot with a Very Honorable and the congratulations of the jury. Her thesis subject: Variations of the deuterium excess in Antarctica during the last 400,000 years: climatic implications Thesis director : Jean Jouzel. In 2011, she obtained a habilitation of research director at the Université de Versailles-Saint Quentin en Yvelines. Thesis presented: "Climate variability in the Tropics and Subtropics: contribution of stable isotopes of water".

== Coordination of national and international projects ==
- Glacial-interglacial changes in ocean surface conditions in the Southern Hemisphere by Valérie Masson-Delmotte, Jean Jouzel, Stievenart and Stievenard. M., Petit J.-R. and Vimeux F., Nature, 398, 410-413, 1999.
- Covariation of carbon dioxide and temperature from the Vostok ice core after deuterium excess correction, by Cuffey K.M. and Vimeux F., Nature, 412, 523–527, 2001.
- New insights into Southern Hemisphere temperature changes from Vostok ice cores using deuterium excess correction over the last 420,000 years, by Cuffey K.M., Jouzel J. and Vimeux F., Earth and Planetary Sciences Letters, 203, 829–843, 2002
- What are the climate controls on isotopic composition (δ D) of precipitation in Zongo Valley (Bolivia)? Implications for the Illimani ice core interpretation by Gallaire R., Bony S., Hoffmann G., Chiang. J. and Fuertes R. et Vimeux F., Earth and Planetary Sciences Letters, 240, 205–220, 2005.
- A promising location in Patagonia for paleoclimate and environmental reconstructions revealed by a shallow firn core from Monte San Valentin (Northern Patagonia Icefield, Chile) by de Angelis M., Ginot P., Magand O., Pouyaud B., Casassa G., Johnsen S., Falourd S. and Vimeux F., Journal of Geophysical Research, in press, doi:10.1029/2007JD009502, 2008.
- Past climate variability from the Last Glacial Maximum to the Holocene in South America and surrounding regions, Springer, 2009.
- Evaluation of cloudiness over Monte San Valentin (Northern Patagonia Icefield) from 2000 to 2008 using MODIS observations: implications for paleoclimate investigations from ice cores, par Maignan F., Reutenauer C. et Vimeux F., Journal of Glaciology, 57, 221–230, 2011
- A 1-year long δ^{18}O record of water vapor in Niamey (Niger) reveals insightful atmospheric processes at different timescales, par Tremoy G., Mayaki S., Souley I., Cattani O., Risi C., Favreau G., Oï M. et Vimeux F., Geophysical Research Letters, 39, L08805, doi:10.1029/2012GL051298, 2012.

== Scientific awards ==
- 2001: André Prud'homme Prize, Société Météorologique de France/Météo France
- 2002 : Grand Prix Etienne Roth, CEA-Académie des Sciences with Valérie Masson-Delmotte.
- 2006 : La Recherche collective prize, mention La Recherche (team : Daniel Brunsten, Delphine Grancher, Georg Hoffmann, Vincent Jomelli, Philippe Naveau and Françoise Vimeux).

== Publications ==
- Glacial-interglacial changes in ocean surface conditions in the Southern Hemisphere par Masson V., Jouzel J., Stievenard. M., Petit J.-R. et Vimeux F., Nature, 398, 410–413, 1999.
- Covariation of carbon dioxide and temperature from the Vostok ice core after deuterium excess correction, par Cuffey K.M. et Vimeux F., Nature, 412, 523–527, 2001.
- New insights into Southern Hemisphere temperature changes from Vostok ice cores using deuterium excess correction over the last 420,000 years, par Cuffey K.M., Jouzel J. et Vimeux F., Earth and Planetary Sciences Letters, 203, 829–843, 2002.
- What are the climate controls on isotopic composition (δ D) of precipitation in Zongo Valley (Bolivia) ? Implications for the Illimani ice core interpretation par Gallaire R., Bony S., Hoffmann G., Chiang. J. et Fuertes R. et Vimeux F., Earth and Planetary Sciences Letters, 240, 205–220, 2005.
- A promising location in Patagonia for paleoclimate and environmental reconstructions revealed by a shallow firn core from Monte San Valentin (Northern Patagonia Icefield, Chile) par de Angelis M., Ginot P., Magand O., Pouyaud B., Casassa G., Johnsen S., Falourd S. et Vimeux F., Journal of Geophysical Research, sous presse, doi:10.1029/2007JD009502, 2008.
- Past climate variability from the Last Glacial Maximum to the Holocene in South America and surrounding regions, Springer, 2009.
- Evaluation of cloudiness over Monte San Valentin (Northern Patagonia Icefield) from 2000 to 2008 using MODIS observations: implications for paleoclimate investigations from ice cores, par Maignan F., Reutenauer C. et Vimeux F., Journal of Glaciology, 57, 221–230, 2011
- A 1-year long δ^{18}O record of water vapor in Niamey (Niger) reveals insightful atmospheric processes at different timescales, par Tremoy G., Mayaki S., Souley I., Cattani O., Risi C., Favreau G., Oï M. et Vimeux F., Geophysical Research Letters, 39, L08805, doi:10.1029/2012GL051298, 2012.

== Actions for the general public ==
- In 2018 Françoise Vimeux presents two videos entitled La mesure des isotopes stables de l'eau and Better understanding the atmospheric water cycle on Reunion Island on a famous streaming platform.
- Regular guest as an expert in climatology in the French television programme C dans l'air programmes devoted to climate disruption.
- Intervention in the programme l'info s'éclaire broadcast on the French channel France Info.
- Speaker on the programme Vos questions d'actualités broadcast on the radio RFI.

== See also ==
- List of climate scientists
