= André Berger =

Belgian professor and climatologist

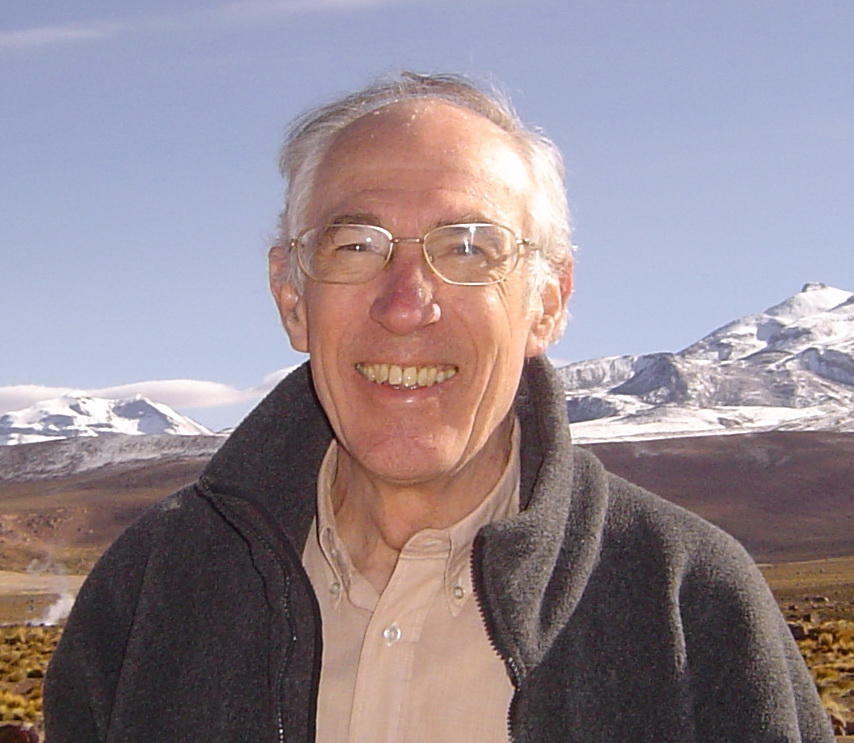
- Berger at El Tatio Geyser (4321 m), Chile, 31 January 2008.
- Born: July 30, 1942 (age 84); Acoz, German-occupied Belgium

André Léon Georges Chevalier Berger (born July 30, 1942) is a Belgian climatologist and professor from Acoz. He is best known for his significant contribution to the renaissance and further development of the astronomical theory of paleoclimates and as a cited pioneer of the interdisciplinary study of climate dynamics and history.

== Biography ==
Trained in mathematics, Berger holds a PhD in sciences from the Université catholique de Louvain (1973) and a master of sciences in meteorology from Massachusetts Institute of Technology (1971). He has received honorary doctoral degrees from Paul Cézanne University Aix-Marseille III (1989), Toulouse III - Paul Sabatier University (1999) and the Faculté polytechnique de Mons (2004). He is presently an emeritus professor and senior researcher at UCLouvain.

Berger works in the field of paleoclimatology, and worked on the astronomical theory of paleoclimate (also known as the Milankovitch theory) in the 1970s, and its promotion and development in the following decades. He has renewed this theory and improved the accuracy of the long term variations of the astronomical parameters used for calculating of the incoming solar radiation (insolation) over the last and next millions of years. He became known in 1977 for his paper in Nature and later in the Journal of Atmospheric and Terrestrial Physics (1978), delivering all the spectral components of the long term variations of orbital eccentricity, obliquity (axial tilt) and climatic precession. His contributions have played a key role in the time scale calibration and interpretation of paleoclimate records and in the modelling of glacial-interglacial cycles. He has mainly worked on the simulation of past and future climates in close collaboration with physicists and geologists worldwide. He was at the origin of the very first Earth systems model of intermediate complexity.

He was full professor of meteorology and climatology at UCL, maître de conférences at the Université de Liège where he was Chaire Francqui in 1989, visiting professor at the Vrije Universiteit Brussel, and has been invited to many other universities in Europe, America and Asia. He was invited to deliver the Union Lecture of the International Union of Geodesy and Geophysics (IUGG) in 1987, the Society Lecture of European Geophysical Society (EGS) in 1994 and the Slichter Lecture at the University of California Los Angeles in 2001. He was chairman of the Institute of Astronomy and Geophysics Georges Lemaître from 1978 to 2001, a period during which he started to develop climate research there. He was the supervisor of 22 doctoral degree theses and continues to serve as a jury member for academic tenure and habilitation.

Berger is the author of Le Climat de la Terre – un passé pour quel avenir?. He started to contribute, as early as in the 1970s, to the awareness of society to global warming and the impact of human activities on climate change.

== Works ==
Berger's field of research is geosciences and more specifically the astronomical theory of paleoclimates and climate modelling. In the 1970s, he improved significantly the accuracy of long-term variations of obliquity and climatic precession used for calculating the incoming solar radiation (insolation). He calculated the periods characterizing the variations of the astronomical parameters, showing that, in addition to the known 40-ka period of obliquity (ka = thousand years) and 21-ka period of climatic precession, there are periods of 400 ka, 125 ka, 95 ka and 100 ka in eccentricity, of 54 ka in obliquity and of 23 ka and 19 ka in climatic precession. Under the leadership of Nicholas Shackleton, he contributed to improve the age of the Brunhes-Matuyama reversal. He identified the instability of the astronomical periods and the existence of a 1.3-Ma period (Ma = million years) in the amplitude modulation of obliquity. He demonstrated the relationship between the different periods of the astronomical parameters, estimated the value of these astronomical periods over tens to hundreds of millions of years, and showed the origin of the 100-ka period in astronomy and, under the leadership of J. Imbrie, in paleoclimates. He delivered an easy-to-handle and accurate calculation of the long-term variations of the daily, seasonal and caloric irradiations. With his team, he developed one of the first Earth Model of Intermediate Complexity (EMICs). Based on such climate models, he showed the importance of the long-term variations of insolation to simulate the glacial-interglacial cycles, the possible exceptional length of our interglacial the importance of the 400-ka period in searching for analogues of our present-day and future climate, the relative role of the multiple feedbacks involved in the explanation of the glacial-interglacial cycles, water vapour in particular. More recently he initiated research on the origin of the east Asian summer monsoon in China and started to work on the diversity of climate over the last nine interglacials.

== Functions ==
Berger has served in many international bodies involved in the development of present-day and past climate research. He was chairman of the International Climate Commission of the International Union of Geodesy and Geophysics (1987–1993) and of the Paleoclimate Commission of the International Union of Quaternary Research (1987–1995); president of the European Geophysical Society (2000–2002), co-creator of the European Geosciences Union of which he is honorary president; member of the First Scientific Steering Committee of the International Geosphere-Biosphere Programme on Global Changes of the Past (1988–1990), Committee which is at the origin of PAGES. In 1991, he was the initiator of the Paleoclimate Modelling Intercomparison Project (PMIP).

For the Commission of the European Communities, he was chairman of the Coordination Group on Climate Processes and Climate Change of the Climatology and Natural Hazards Program (1988–1992), of the External Advisory Group on Global Change, Climate and Biodiversity (2000–2002) and member of the Contact Group of the Climate Programme on Reconstruction of Past Climate, Climate Models and Anthropogenic Impacts on Climate from 1980 to 1983 (groups which are at the origin of the CEC Framework Programme).

For the Scientific Committee of NATO, he was chairman of the Special Programme Panels on the Science of Global Environmental Change (1992) and on Air-Sea Interactions (1981) and of the programme Advisory Committee of the International Technical Meeting on Air Pollution Modelling and its Applications (1980–1985).

He was also member of committees in charge of advising policy makers and scientific institutions, in particular the European Environment Agency (EEA, 2002–2009), the European Science Foundation (ESF), Gaz de France (1994–1999 ) and Electricité de France (1998–2009). He was a member of the scientific committee of universities and research institutes, among which Laboratoire des sciences du climat et de l'environnement, Laboratoire de Météorologie Dynamique, Département Terre-Atmosphère-Océan de l'Ecole Normale Supérieure, Institut Paul Simon Laplace et Collège de France in Paris, Laboratoire de Glaciologie et de Géophysique de l'Environnement and the European University and Scientific Pole of Grenoble, LEGOS in Toulouse, Météo-France, Hadley Centre for Climate Prediction and Research in Great-Britain and Beijing Normal University. He is a voting member of the BAEF (Belgian American Educational Foundation, Herbert Hoover Commission for Relief in Belgium) which he was fellow in 1970–1971.

He has organised and chaired international meetings, among which are the First International School of Climatology on Climatic Variations and Variability, Facts and Theories at the Ettore Majorana Center of Erice in Sicily, from 9 to 21 March 1980, the symposium Milankovitch and Climate (with J. Imbrie) at the Lamont Doherty Geological Observatory from 30 November to 3 December 1982, the tenth general assembly of the European Geophysical Society in Louvain-la-Neuve from 30 July to 4 August 1984, the IUGG symposium Contribution of Geophysical Sciences to Climate Change Studies in Vancouver in August 1987, the symposium Climate and Geo-Sciences, a Challenge for Science and Society for the 21st Century in Louvain-la-Neuve in May 1988, the symposium Climate and Ozone at the Dawn of the third Millennium in honour of Paul Crutzen, Nobel Prize 1995, of Willi Dansgaard and Nicholas Shackleton, Crafoord Prize 1995 and, with Claude Lorius, Tyler Prize for Environment 1996, the Milutin Milankovitch anniversary symposia in Belgrade in 2004 and 2009, the first Colloque à l'étranger du Collège de France at the Palais des Académies in Bruxelles on 8–9 May 2006 (with J. Reisse and Jean-Pierre Changeux), the Third von Humboldt International Conference on East Asian Monsoon, Past, Present and Future, at the Chinese Academy of Sciences in Beijing from 24 to 30 August 2007 (with Z. Ding) . In 2009, a special issue of Climate of the Past was published in his honour with a preface dedicated to his work.

In Belgium, he is a co-founding member (with Alain Hubert and Hugo Decleir, 1999) and member of the Administration Council of the International Polar Foundation, member of Mgr Lemaître Foundation (1995), member of Fonds Léopold III de Belgique for the Exploration and Conservation of Nature, of the Scientific Council of GreenFacts, administrator of the Fondation Hoover Louvain and member of the National Committee of Geodesy and Geophysics (IUGG) which he was the president from 2000 to 2004, of the National Committee of the International Geosphere-Biospere Programme on Global Change (IGBP), of the National Committee for Quaternary Research (BELQUA), of the National Committee for Antarctic Research (SCAR) and of the National Committee of the Scientific Committee on Problems of the Environment (SCOPE)

== Awards ==
- 2010 Prix Georges Lemaître of the Amis et Anciens de l'UCL and of the Fondation Louvain
- 2008 Winner of an Advanced Investigators Grant of the European Research Council
- 2007 Foreign member of the Academy of Science of the Royal Society of Canada (MSRC-FRSC)
- 2006 Foreign member of the Serbian Academy of Sciences and Arts
- 2004 Special recognition to distinguished Belgian scholars from the World Cultural Council
- 2003 Associate member of the Royal Astronomical Society, London
- 2003 Membre titulaire de l'Académie Nationale de l'Air et de l'Espace de Toulouse
- 2002 Member of the l'Académie royale des sciences, des lettres et des beaux-arts de Belgique
- 2001 European Latsis Prize in 2001.
- 2000 Membre associé étranger de l'Académie des Sciences de Paris (France)
- 1997 Foreign member of the Royal Netherlands Academy of Arts and Sciences
- 1999 Fellow of AGU
- 1996 Chevalier (Belgian Knight) by His Majesty Albert II, King of the Belgians. Motto is Lux Scientia et Labore.
- 1995 The Prix quinquennal A. De Leeuw-Damry-Bourlart of the Belgian National Funds for Scientific Research for 1991–1995.
- 1994 Norbert Gerbier-Mumm International Award from the World Meteorological Organization (1994).
- 1994 Milutin Milankovic Medal from the European Geophysical Society (1994).
- 1989 Member of Academia Europaea
- 1989 Golden Award of the European Geophysical Society (EGS)
- 1987 Honorary member of the European Geophysical Society (EGS)
- 1987 Foreign member of the Royal Netherlands Academy of Arts and Sciences Koninklijke Nederlandse Akademie van Wetenschappen
- 1984 Prix Charles Lagrange de la Classe des Sciences of the Académie Royale des Sciences, des Lettres et des Beaux-Arts de Belgique (20e période quadriennale 1980–1984)
- 1980 Prize of the first biennial 1979–1980 of the Societa Italiana di Fisica
- He is Officier de la Légion d'honneur (2010), Grand officier de l'Ordre de la Couronne (see citation) (2007), and Officier de l'Ordre de Léopold (1989)
- He is part of the stamp sheet "This is Belgium 2007" with eight other Belgian scientists and of the Gallery of Geniuses of the Coimbra Group Universities at the University of Jena. In 2008 he was among the 35 greatest Belgian scientists selected by the Belgian Universities and Eos Science.
- He received the Silver Medal of His Holiness Pope Paul VI in 1979.

== Bibliography ==
- Berger, André (1992), Le climat de la terre: un passé pour quel avenir?, De Boeck Université, ISBN 978-2-8041-1497-8
- Berger, André; Dickinson, Robert Earl; Kidson, John W. (1989), Understanding climate change, Issue 52, American Geophysical Union, ISBN 978-0-87590-457-3
- Berger, André; NATO; OTAN (1989), Climate and geo-sciences: a challenge for science and society in the 21st century, NATO ASI Series: advanced science institutes series., Series C, Mathematical and physical sciences;, 285., Dordrecht, ISBN 978-0-7923-0404-3

== See also ==
- List of climate scientists
