= Studia Quaternaria =

- Discipline: Quaternary science
- Language: English
- Edited by: Leszek Marks

Publication details
- Former name: Quaternary Studies in Poland
- History: 1979–present
- Publisher: Polish Academy of Sciences (Poland)
- Open access: Yes
- License: CC-BY-NC-ND

Standard abbreviations
- ISO 4: Stud. Quat.

Indexing
- ISSN: 1641-5558 (print); 2300-0384 (web)

Links
- Journal homepage

Studia Quaternaria is a peer-reviewed open access scholarly journal publishing research articles on quaternary science. It is a journal published by the Polish Academy of Sciences (PAN). The current editor-in-chief is Leszek Marks. It changed name from Quaternary Studies in Poland to the current title in the year 2000.

== Abstracting and indexing ==
The journal is abstracted and indexed in:

- DOAJ
- Emerging Sources Citation Index
- Scopus
- Zoological Record
