= Journal of Quaternary Science =

- Discipline: Quaternary science
- Language: English

Publication details
- History: 1986-present
- Publisher: Wiley-Blackwell
- Frequency: 8/year
- Impact factor: 2.939 (2012)

Standard abbreviations
- ISO 4: J. Quat. Sci.

Indexing
- ISSN: 0267-8179 (print); 1099-1417 (web)
- LCCN: 90642779
- OCLC no.: 44075630

Links
- Journal homepage

The Journal of Quaternary Science is a peer-reviewed academic journal published on behalf of the Quaternary Research Association. It covers research on any aspect of quaternary science. The journal publishes predominantly research articles with two thematic issues published annually, although discussions and letters are occasionally published along with invited reviews. According to the Journal Citation Reports, the journal has a 2012 impact factor of 2.939.

== See also ==
- Boreas – An International Journal of Quaternary Research
