= Milutin Milankovic Medal =

Award givin for climate change research

- Awarded for: For outstanding research in long-term climatic changes and modelling
- First award: 1993
- Website: Milutin Milankovic Medal

The Milutin Milankovic Medal is an annual award in Earth science presented by the European Geosciences Union (EGU). The award was introduced in 1993 by the European Geophysical Society (EGS). After a merger with the European Union of Geosciences in 2003, the award has been given by the Climate: Past, Present and Future Division. The medal is awarded to scientists for outstanding research in the field of long-term climate change and modeling. It is named after the Serb geophysicist Milutin Milanković in recognition of his academic and editorial services.

== Recipients ==
- 1993: Bert R. J. Bolin
- 1994: André L. Berger
- 1995: Jean-Claude Duplessy
- 1996: Lennart Bengtsson
- 1997: Jean Jouzel
- 1998: Syukuro Manabe
- 1999: Sir Nicholas J. Shackleton
- 2000: Robert Sadourny
- 2001: John E. Kutzbach
- 2002: I. Colin Prentice
- 2003: George Kukla, John Imbrie
- 2004: Frederik Hilgen
- 2005: Martin Claussen
- 2006: Michael Sarnthein
- 2007: Wang Pinxian
- 2008: William Richard Peltier
- 2009: Pascale Braconnot
- 2010: James D. Hays
- 2011: Andrey Ganopolski
- 2012: Wolfgang Berger
- 2013: Didier Paillard
- 2014: Maureen E. Raymo
- 2015: Paul J. Valdes
- 2016: James C. Zachos
- 2017: Axel Timmermann
- 2018: David A. Hodell
- 2019: Jacques Laskar
- 2020: Valérie Masson-Delmotte
- 2021: Ayako Abe-Ouchi
- 2022: Hai Cheng
- 2023: Bette L. Otto-Bliesner
- 2024: Peter U. Clark
- 2025: Zhengyu Liu
