= EMIC =

EMIC may refer to:

- Emergency Maternity and Infant Care, a medical support program set up for new mothers (and their babies) whose husbands were in the lower ranks of the U.S. military 1943 to 1947.
- Central Emergency Operation Center, Taiwan
- Eagle Mountain International Church, Texas, United States
- Earth systems model of intermediate complexity, a class of climate models
- Team EMIC, a racing team in the Formula 1 Powerboat World Championship

== See also ==
- Emic, a type of field research in the social sciences
