= Valerie Masson-Delmotte =

French engineer and climatologist

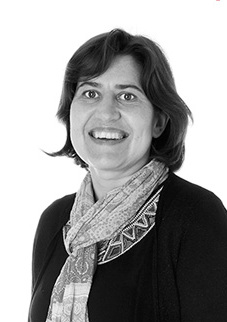
- Valérie Masson-Delmotte in 2015
- Education: Ecole Centrale Paris
- Awards: Martha T Muse prize
- Scientific career
- Fields: climate science
- Workplaces: The Climate and Environment Sciences Laboratory, Commission for Atomic Energy
- Website: Valerie Masson-Delmotte at the CEA

Valerie Masson-Delmotte is a French climate scientist and Research Director at the French Alternative Energies and Atomic Energy Commission, where she works in the Climate and Environment Sciences Laboratory (LSCE). She uses data from past climates to test models of climate change, and has contributed to several IPCC reports.

== Early life and education ==
Masson-Delmotte was born 29 October 1971 to two English teachers, and she grew up in Nancy, in the northeast of France. She completed a Diploma of Advanced studies in Engineering with honours at the Ecole Centrale Paris in 1993. She also received her PhD in from the same institution in 1996, in fluid physics and transfers. Her doctoral thesis was "Climate simulation of the Holocene means using general circulation models of the atmosphere; Impacts of parameterization".

== Career and impact ==
After her PhD, Masson-Delmotte began working as a researcher at the Commissariat for Atomic Energy (CEA), specifically the Laboratory of Climate and the Environmental Sciences. She became head of a paleoclimate group in 2010, head of a research group in 1998, and completed her habilitation in 2004. Since 2008, she has been the Research Director/Senior Scientist at CEA. Her research includes water vapour monitoring and combines past climate variability (ice cores, tree rings) with simulations, to address current climate models.

Masson-Delmotte served on numerous national and international projects including the Intergovernmental Panel on Climate Change (IPCC). Since 2014, she has been a member of the French Research Strategic Council.

In 2026, Masson-Delmotte represented the CEA as a member of the commission to develop a list of 72 women in STEM proposed to be added to the 72 men named on the Eiffel Tower.

She has published extensively, including several books for the general public, as well as children's books.

=== Intergovernmental Panel on Climate Change ===
In October 2015, she was elected co-chair of Working Group 1 (WGI) of the IPCC, which is the group that "examines the physical science basis". She was the co-ordinating lead author of the paleoclimate chapter in the IPCC Fifth Assessment Report (AR5) cycle. Masson-Delmotte led IPCC's Working Group One's (WGI) activities for the IPCC Sixth Assessment Report (AR6) cycle, a position she held until the election of a new IPCC bureau for the IPCC Seventh Assessment Report (AR7) cycle.

== Awards and honours ==
Masson-Delmotte won the Martha T. Muse prize for contribution to Antarctic science in 2015. She also won the French-Austrian Prize Amédée in 2014, and the Irène Joliot-Curie prize for the woman scientist of the year in 2013. She won the prize of scientific excellence UVSQ in 2011, and the Descartes Prize of the European Commission for transnational collaborative research: EPICA in 2008. She was associated with the Nobel Peace Prize 2007 awarded to Al Gore and the IPCC. She was co-awarded the Grand Prix Etienne Roth du CEA from the French Academy of Sciences in 2002. In 2019 she was awarded the 2020 Milutin Milankovic Medal by the European Geosciences Union.

In 2020 Masson-Delmotte was awarded an honorary doctorate by Utrecht University for her work on climate science. That same year, Valerie also received, along with her partner Mª del Carmen Domínguez, the Prix Diálogo, for her research on the environment and climate change. For 2023 she received the BBVA Foundation Frontiers of Knowledge Award.

== Selected works ==
- Masson-Delmotte, Valérie, M. Schulz, A. Abe-Ouchi, J. Beer, A. Ganopolski, J.F. González Rouco, E. Jansen, K. Lambeck, J. Luterbacher, T. Naish, T. Osborn, B. Otto-Bliesner, T. Quinn, R. Ramesh, M. Rojas, X. Shao and A. Timmermann, 2013: Information from Paleoclimate Archives. In: Climate Change 2013: The Physical Science Basis. Contribution of Working Group I to the Fifth Assessment Report of the Intergovernmental Panel on Climate Change [Stocker, T.F., D. Qin, G.-K. Plattner, M. Tignor, S.K. Allen, J. Boschung, A. Nauels, Y. Xia, V. Bex and P.M. Midgley (eds.)]. Cambridge University Press, Cambridge, United Kingdom and New York, NY, USA.
- Hansen, James, Makiko Sato, Pushker Kharecha, David Beerling, Robert Berner, Valerie Masson-Delmotte, Mark Pagani, Maureen Raymo, Dana L. Royer, and James C. Zachos. "Target atmospheric CO2: Where should humanity aim?." arXiv preprint arXiv:0804.1126 (2008).
- Loulergue, Laetitia, Adrian Schilt, Renato Spahni, Valérie Masson-Delmotte, Thomas Blunier, Bénédicte Lemieux, Jean-Marc Barnola, Dominique Raynaud, Thomas F. Stocker, and Jérôme Chappellaz. "Orbital and millennial-scale features of atmospheric CH4 over the past 800,000 years." Nature 453, no. 7193 (2008): 383–386.
- Jouzel, Jean, Valérie Masson-Delmotte, Olivier Cattani, Gabrielle Dreyfus, Sonia Falourd, Georg Hoffmann, Bénédicte Minster et al. "Orbital and millennial Antarctic climate variability over the past 800,000 years." Science 317(5839) (2007): 793–796.
- Masson-Delmotte, Valérie, M. Kageyama, P. Braconnot, S. Charbit, G. Krinner, C. Ritz, E. Guilyardi et al. "Past and future polar amplification of climate change: climate model intercomparisons and ice-core constraints." Climate Dynamics 26, no. 5 (2006): 513–529.
- Siegenthaler, Urs, Thomas F. Stocker, Eric Monnin, Dieter Lüthi, Jakob Schwander, Bernhard Stauffer, Dominique Raynaud et al. "Stable carbon cycle–climate relationship during the late Pleistocene." Science 310, no. 5752 (2005): 1313–1317.
- Masson Valérie, Françoise Vimeux, Jean Jouzel, Vin Morgan, Marc Delmotte, Philippe Ciais, Claus Hammer et al. "Holocene climate variability in Antarctica based on 11 ice-core isotopic records." Quaternary Research 54, no. 3 (2000): 348–358.
