= Stephen C. Porter =

American geologist (1934–2015)

Stephen Cummings Porter
- Born: Stephen Cummings Porter; April 18, 1934; Santa Barbara, California
- Died: February 19, 2015 (aged 80); Carpinteria, California
- Education: Yale University
- Scientific career
- Fields: Geology; Glaciology
- Workplaces: University of Washington
- Doctoral advisor: Richard Foster Flint

Stephen Cummings Porter (April 18, 1934 – February 19, 2015) was an American geologist who taught in the department of Geological Sciences (now called the department of Earth and Space Sciences) and directed the Quaternary Research Center at the University of Washington. He was chief editor of the journal Quaternary Research from 1976 until his retirement in 2001. He died on February 19, 2015, aged 80.

Porter was well known for his work in glacial geology, and was a pioneer of the subject, particularly in China, which he visited for fieldwork and conferences more than 30 times over the course of his career. He also did field work in several many and formerly glaciated areas around the world, including Alaska's Brooks Range, The Italian Alps, Chilean Andes, New Zealand Alps, Himalayas, the Hindu Kush, and Hawaii's Big Island. Among his important contributions was the elucidation of climate record contained in the Loess Plateau sediments of China, and the recognition of the role of volcanism in explaining the cold temperatures of the Little Ice Age.

Porter was honored for his work with numerous awards, including two awards from the Chinese Academy of Science, and the Kirk Bryan Award from the Geological Society of America. He was awarded in 2004 the Distinguished Career Award from the American Quaternary Association and in 2011 the International Union for Quaternary Research (INQUA) Distinguished Career Medal.

Porter served as president of both the American Quaternary Association (1992–1994) and the International Union for Quaternary Research (INQUA) (1995–1999), and was an elected Fellow of the American Association for the Advancement of Science, the Geological Society of America and the Arctic Institute of North America.
