= Nicholas Shackleton =

British geologist (1937–2006)

Sir Nicholas Shackleton FRS
- Born: 23 June 1937
- Died: 24 January 2006 (aged 68)
- Known for: Quaternary Period
- Awards: Fellow of the Royal Society (1985); Francis P. Shepard Medal (1985); Lyell Medal (1987); Wollaston Medal (1996); Urey Medal (2003); Vetlesen Prize (2004); Blue Planet Prize (2005)
- Scientific career
- Fields: Geology

Sir Nicholas John Shackleton FRS (23 June 1937 – 24 January 2006) was an English geologist and paleoclimatologist who specialised in the Quaternary Period. He was the son of the distinguished field geologist Robert Millner Shackleton and great-nephew of the explorer Ernest Shackleton.

== Education and employment ==
Educated at Cranbrook School, Kent (thanks to the generosity of a person he called his "fairy godmother" as she paid his school fees) Shackleton went on to read natural sciences at Clare College, Cambridge. He graduated with the Bachelor of Arts degree in 1961, promoted in 1964 to Master of Arts. In 1967 Cambridge awarded him a PhD degree, for a thesis entitled "The Measurement of Paleotemperatures in the Quaternary Era".

Apart from periods abroad as Visiting Professor or Research Associate, Shackleton's entire scientific career was spent at Cambridge. He became Ad hominem Professor in 1991, in the Department of Earth Sciences, working in the Godwin Institute for Quaternary Research.

== Paleoceanography ==
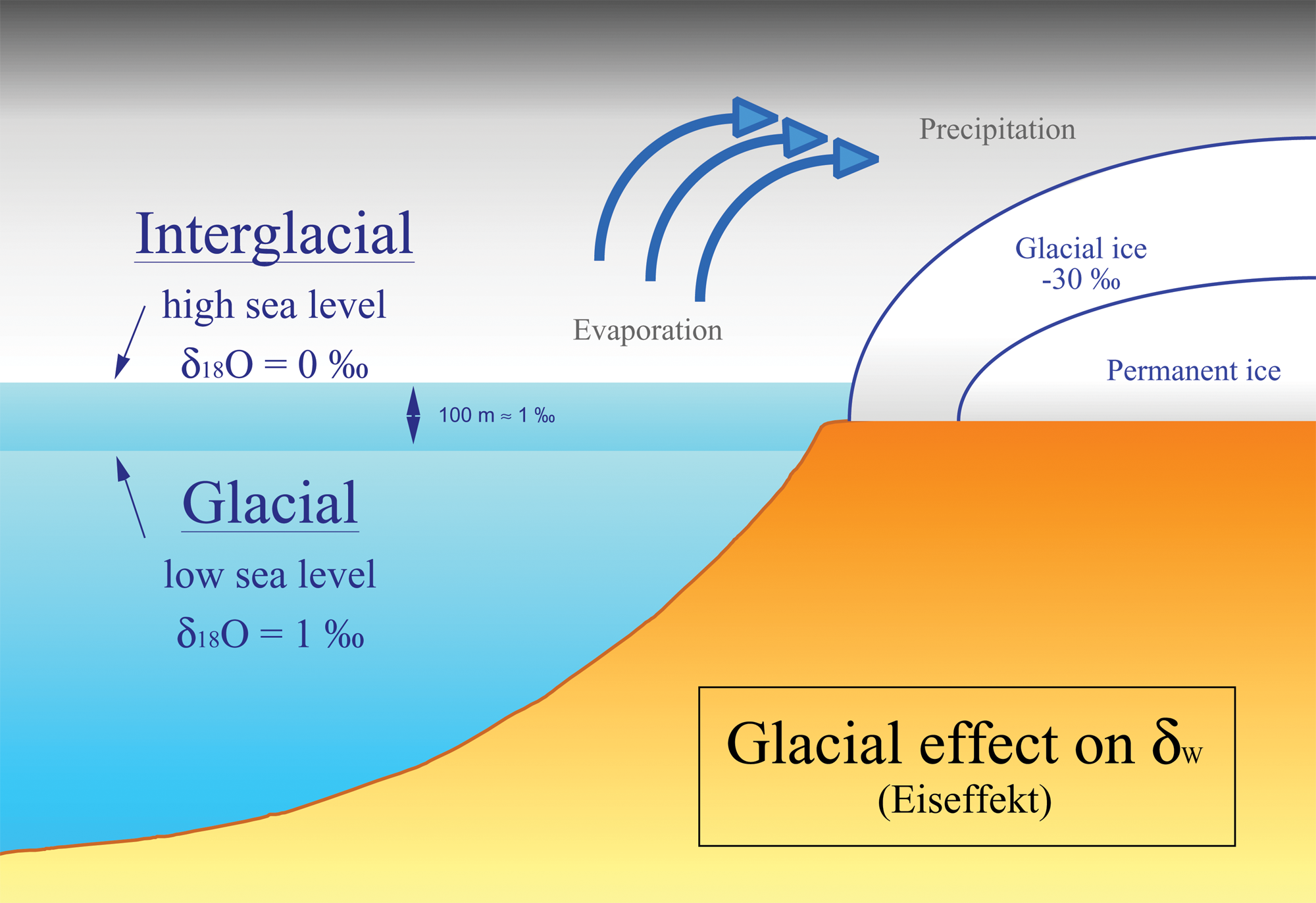
The Glacial effect describes the change of the oxygen isotope composition of sea water, due to growing ice sheets in high latitudes during glacials.

Shackleton was a key figure in the field of paleoceanography, publishing over two hundred scientific papers. He was a pioneer in the use of mass spectrometry to determine changes in climate as recorded in the oxygen isotope composition of calcareous microfossils. Shackleton also found evidence that the Earth's last magnetic field reversal was 780,000 years ago. He became internationally known, in 1976, with the publication of a paper, with James Hays and John Imbrie, in Science entitled "Variations in the Earth's orbit: Pacemaker of the ice ages". Using ocean sediment cores, Shackleton, Hays and Imbrie demonstrated that oscillations in climate over the past few million years could be correlated with variations in the orbital and positional relationship between the Earth and the Sun (see Milankovitch cycles).

Much of Shackleton's later work focused on constructing precise timescales based on matching the periodic cycles in deep-sea sediment cores to calculations of incoming sunlight at particular latitudes over geological time. This method allows a far greater level of stratigraphic precision than other dating methods, and has also helped to clarify the rates and mechanisms of aspects of climate change.

In September 2000 Shackleton published an innovative study of the relationship between the oxygen isotope record of the oceans and isotope records obtained from the ice in Antarctica (glacial effect). This helped to identify the relative contribution of deep water temperature changes and ice volume changes to the marine isotopic record, and also highlighted the close interdependency between carbon dioxide levels and temperature change over the last 400,000 years.

In 1995 Shackleton became Director of the Godwin Institute for Quaternary Research. In 1998 he was knighted for his services to earth sciences. From 1999 to 2003 he was president of the International Union for Quaternary Research (INQUA). In 2010 Nick Shackleton was one of ten scientists depicted on a set of postage stamps, in commemoration of the 350th anniversary of the Royal Society. Shackleton was chosen to represent Earth Science.

The European Association of Geochemistry quinquennially awards a Science Innovation Award medal named in his honour for work in climatology.

== Clarinet ==
Shackleton was also a skilled amateur clarinet player, and collector of woodwind instruments. During his lifetime he amassed a large collection of clarinets and related instruments. His Cambridge home became a place of pilgrimage for many players and scholars. Shackleton was internationally known as an organologist, reflected in his many journal articles, as well as his contributions to the 1980 and 2001 editions of The New Grove Dictionary of Music and Musicians, as well as the Grove Dictionary of Musical Instruments. Most of Shackleton's substantial instrument collection, numbering over 700 instruments, was bequeathed to the University of Edinburgh together with an endowment. Part of the collection is now exhibited at the Reid Concert Hall, as part of Edinburgh University's Collection of Historic Musical Instruments. The collection has been described in a published catalogue .

In addition to his reputation in the scientific world, Shackleton was highly respected by many musicians, and a friend to many who studied at Cambridge, including Christopher Hogwood who lodged with him for several years. The fine copies, by Cambridge maker Daniel Bangham, of many clarinets in Shackleton's collection, had a significant impact on historical performance from the 1980s, and continue to be used by leading performers today.

== Personal life ==
From 1986 until her death in 2002, Shackleton was married to Vivien Law, a linguistic scholar.

== Awards ==
- Doctor of Science (ScD), University of Cambridge 1984
- Fellow of the Royal Society (FRS) 1985
- Francis P. Shepard Medal, Society for Sedimentary Geology 1985
- Carus Medal, Deutsche Akademie für Naturforscher 'Leopoldina' 1985
- Lyell Medal, Geological Society of London 1987
- Founding member, Academia Europaea 1988
- Fellow, American Geophysical Union 1990
- A.G. Huntsman Award for Excellence in the Marine Sciences (Bedford Institute of Oceanography Canada) 1990
- Crafoord Prize, Royal Swedish Academy of Sciences 1995
- Honorary Doctor of Laws, Dalhousie University Canada 1996
- Wollaston Medal, Geological Society of London 1996
- Honorary Doctor of Philosophy, Stockholm University 1997
- Knighthood for services to the earth sciences in 1998
- Milutin Milankovic Medal, European Geophysical Society 1999
- Foreign Associate, US National Academy of Sciences 2000
- Foreign Member, Royal Netherlands Academy of Arts and Sciences, 2001
- Honorary Doctorate, Geology, University of Padova, Italy, 2002
- Maurice Ewing Medal, American Geophysical Union 2002
- Honorary member, EUG 2003
- Urey Medal, 2003
- Royal Medal, Royal Society of London 2003
- Vetlesen Prize, Lamont–Doherty Earth Observatory of Columbia University 2004
- Fellow of the American Association for the Advancement of Science 2004
- Founder's Medal, Royal Geographical Society 2005
- Blue Planet Prize, Asahi Glass Foundation, Japan 2005
