= Leszek Marks =

Polish geologist, professor ordinarius (born 1951)

Leszek Eugeniusz Marks (born 1951 in Warsaw) is a Polish geologist, professor ordinarius (since 1998), currently (2016) at the Warsaw University, Department of Climate Geology; and the Polish Geological Institute-National Research Institute (PIG-PIB), president of Committee for Quaternary Research of the Polish Academy of Sciences. At present (2016), member of editorial boards of scientific journals Boreas, "Litosfera", "Geography and Geology", and Studia Quaternaria (editor-in-chief).
