= Jean-Claude Duplessy =

French geochemist

Jean-Claude Duplessy (born in 1942), is a French geochemist. He is Director of Research Emeritus at the CNRS and a member of the French Academy of Sciences.

== Biography ==
Jean-Claude Duplessy, a former student of the Ecole Normale Supérieure (Ulm), a physics graduate, is a geochemist. His work has contributed to a better understanding of how the ocean has functioned over the recent history of the Earth. He is a recognized pioneer in rebuilding ocean dynamics through the use of carbon isotopes and foraminiferous shell oxygen in marine sediments. He was one of the first to see the importance of a high quality chronology for a reliable interpretation of measurements related to climate variations in the Earth's past.

== Scientific work ==
He began his research just as the foundations of isotopic geochemistry were beginning to be well established through the work of Harold Urey and Cesare Emiliani in Chicago. The analysis of stable isotopes and natural radioactive elements makes it possible to approach the study of major biogeochemical cycles in an original way and to reconstruct changes in the Earth's climate and environment by applying current principles.

Jean-Claude Duplessy initially focused on the concretions of the caves and demonstrated that they were good recorders of the hydrological cycle and air temperature at the time they were formed. He obtained the first reconstructions of air temperatures and climatic conditions in the south of France for the last millennia and for the previous interglacial period Recently, this type of study has been resumed in Europe due to the development of new dating methods and the study of stalagmites seems open to a great future.

Duplessy turned to the ocean because of its role as a climate regulator and its major impact on biogeochemical cycles, particularly the carbon cycle. His doctoral thesis work has focused on the geochemistry of stable carbon isotopes in the sea. He showed how the distribution of the stable heavy carbon isotope, carbon-13, was governed by biological fractionations related to chlorophyll assimilation by phytoplankton, then by ocean circulation and finally, to a lesser extent, by gas exchanges between the ocean and the atmosphere. All these phenomena, which dominate the carbon cycle in the ocean, are now being taken into account to study the fate of carbon dioxide emitted by human activities.

Duplessy led numerous oceanographic campaigns and showed that variations in the isotopic composition of fossil foraminifera present in the sediments of the various oceans made it possible to reconstruct changes in the isotopic composition of the ocean and ocean circulation on a large scale, which opened a new scientific field, paleo-oceanography. This has grown to the point where there is now an international journal devoted to this discipline, of which he was one of the first associate editors.

He established the first reconstructions of the deep ocean circulation during the height of the last ice age and during the last interglacial period. This has led him to highlight a disruption in the functioning of the ocean: the North Atlantic deep water disappears under glacial conditions, accompanied by a general slowdown in large-scale ocean circulation, the intensity of the Gulf Stream and the heat flux transported by the Atlantic Ocean to the coasts of Western Europe.

The deep waters of the world ocean are formed by convection and diving of dense surface waters during winter periods. To understand the causes of changes in deep ocean circulation, it was necessary to develop a method to reconstruct not only the temperature (which was already known), but also the salinity of surface waters in the past. Duplessy has developed a method based on fractionations that affect stable oxygen isotopes during the water cycle. This has allowed him to reconstruct the salinity of the Atlantic Ocean during the last glacial maximum with sufficient accuracy for major modelling groups to use this data to simulate global ocean circulation using general ocean circulation models. These results have provided the basis for understanding ocean circulation in glacial climates and the role that the ocean can play in disrupting climate, as outlined in a book written for the general public entitled "When the ocean gets angry ". He is also the co-author of "Gros temps sur la planète ", "Paléoclimatologie : Tome 1, and Tome 2 "Paléoclimatologie : Tome 2, Emboiter les pièces du puzzle : comprendre et modéliser un système complexe ".

Chronology plays an essential role in understanding the evolution of climates and the links with astronomical theory initiated by Dr. Milankovitch and developed by André Berger in Louvain-La-Neuve and John Imbrie at Brown University. Duplessy launched the first accelerator mass spectrometry laboratory, one of the objectives of which is the fine measurement of carbon-14 to date marine sediments. With his collaborators, he was able to provide the first evidence of a ten-degree change in seawater temperature in times compatible with human life. These results were confirmed and further refined by the study of drilling in Greenland ice. Today, rapid climatic variations are recognized as a major feature of climate change.

While developing this research and a group of marine paleoclimatology, he has endeavoured to bring to light in France the study of biogeochemical cycles within the surface envelopes of our planet. With the support of the CNRS, he launched the program to study the flow of matter in the ocean. This programme would bring together the actions of biologists, chemists and geochemists by highlighting the fundamental role of the coupling between biology and geochemistry, which led to the now recognized notion of biogeochemistry. This effort led the French teams to initiate, with their American and European colleagues, the International Joint Global Ocean Flux Study program to quantify carbon fluxes in the ocean and the role of plankton-produced particulate matter transfer in supplying the deep ocean environment with carbon, food and energy.

By the late 1980s, it had become clear that understanding living conditions on the Earth's surface required studying the couplings between the geosphere and living things. At the request of COFUSI (Comité français des unions scientifiques internationales), Duplessy chaired the French scientific committee of the International Geosphere-Biosphere Programme. He federated research on the physical, chemical and biological mechanisms that govern the evolution of our environment. This research program initiated the study of the variability of the coupled geosphere-biosphere system, giving high priority to palaeoclimatic and palaeo-environmental reconstructions over geological time. These studies have thus made it possible to highlight phenomena as unexpected as the great variability of the carbon cycle in relation to changes in vegetation. These themes will become increasingly important in the coming years in the study of human-induced climate change, as the future evolution of greenhouse gas concentrations can only be realistically simulated if the interactions between the biosphere and biogeochemical cycles are well understood, so that they can be taken into account in models simulating the behaviour of the "Earth" system. The last interglacial period of 120,000 years, often taken as an analogue of a significantly warmer climate than today, reflects major changes in global ocean temperature and circulation that have contributed to destabilizing the West Antarctic ice cap.

== Honours and awards ==
- Jean-Claude Duplessy was one of the lead authors of the "paleoclimatology" chapter of the report of the Intergovernmental Panel on Climate Change (IPCC), which was published in 2007.
- His mission was to coordinate the activities of some twenty scientists from the international community with the objective of showing how the study of ancient climates makes it possible to better understand the mechanisms that could come into play in a world whose climate is disrupted by greenhouse gas and dust emissions. He was co-recipient, with his IPCC colleagues, of the 2007 Nobel Peace Prize in this capacity.
- He has been a member of the French Academy of Sciences since 2011 in the "Sciences of the Universe" section.
- He is a member of the European Academy of Sciences, Academia europaea since 1989
- Winner of the Aimé Berthé Prize of the Academy of Sciences (1987)
- Milankovitch Medal of the EGS (1995).
- Winner of the Georges Lemaître Prize of the Catholic University of Louvain (1997)
- Dr Honoris Causa from the University of Kiel, Germany (2003).
- Grand Prix Louis D of the Institut de France 2004.
- Prestwich Prize of the French Geological Society 2004.
- Grand Prix Dolomieu of BRGM awarded by the Academy of Sciences in 2004.
