= American Quaternary Association =

American geology organization

The American Quaternary Association (AMQUA) is a professional organization of North American scientists devoted to studies of the quaternary geological period. They were founded in 1970 and their stated goals are to "foster cooperation and communication among the remarkably broad array of disciplines involved in studying the Quaternary Period". These disciplines include: anthropology, archaeology, botany, climatology, ecology, geochemistry, geochronology, geography, geology, geomorphology, geophysics, hydrology, limnology, meteorology, neotectonics, oceanography, paleontology, palynology, soil science, and zoology.

They host biennial conventions on a variety of themes, with themes chosen to appeal to a broad range of represented disciplines. Their most recent conference had the theme "Ocean/Atmosphere Interactions and Continental Consequences: Environmental Forecasting from the Quaternary Sciences" and was held in Bozeman, Montana.

In addition to their conference, they also publish a newsletter The Quaternary Times, semiannually and present a Distinguished Career Award annually.

== See also ==
- International Union for Quaternary Research
