= Zenobia Jacobs =

South African archaeologist and earth scientist

- Born: South Africa
- Education: University of Stellenbosch; Aberystwyth University, Wales
- Occupations: archaeologist and earth scientist

Zenobia Jacobs is a South African-born archaeologist and earth scientist specialising in geochronology. She is a professor at the University of Wollongong, Australia.

== Education and career ==
Jacobs graduated from the University of Stellenbosch in South Africa, in 1998, studying archaeology and geography, and received her PhD from Aberystwyth University, Wales, in 2004. She joined the University of Wollongong as a research fellow in 2006 and is currently a professor in the Centre for Archaeological Science and the School of Earth of Environmental Sciences. She is also an Australian Research Council (ARC) Future Fellow and chief investigator in the ARC Centre of Excellence for Australian Biodiversity and Heritage. She was awarded the International Union for Quaternary Research's Sir Nick Shackleton Medal in 2009.

Jacobs' research traces the evolutionary history of humans using single-grain optically stimulated luminescence dating. Her work on the Denisovans and Neanderthals has helped establish a timeline of when the two groups of archaic humans were present in southern Siberia and the environmental conditions they faced before going extinct. She has also contributed to reconstructions of past environments in Africa, using ancient high sea-levels as analogues for future trends, and studies of the ecological footprint of the first humans to reach Australia and Madagascar.

== Selected publications ==
- Zhang, Dongju; Xia, Huan; Chen, Fahu; Li, Bo; Slon, Viviane; Cheng, Ting; Yang, Ruowei; Jacobs, Zenobia; Dai, Qingyan; Massilani, Diyendo; Shen, Xuke (30 October 2020). "Denisovan DNA in Late Pleistocene sediments from Baishiya Karst Cave on the Tibetan Plateau". Science. 370 (6516): 584–587. doi:10.1126/science.abb6320. ISSN 0036-8075. PMID 33122381. S2CID 225956074.
- Douka, Katerina; Slon, Viviane; Jacobs, Zenobia; Ramsey, Christopher Bronk; Shunkov, Michael V.; Derevianko, Anatoly P.; Mafessoni, Fabrizio; Kozlikin, Maxim B.; Li, Bo; Grün, Rainer; Comeskey, Daniel (2019). "Age estimates for hominin fossils and the onset of the Upper Palaeolithic at Denisova Cave". Nature. 565 (7741): 640–644. Bibcode:2019Natur.565..640D. doi:10.1038/s41586-018-0870-z. ISSN 1476-4687. PMID 30700871. S2CID 59525455.
