= Milankovitch cycles =

Global climate cycles

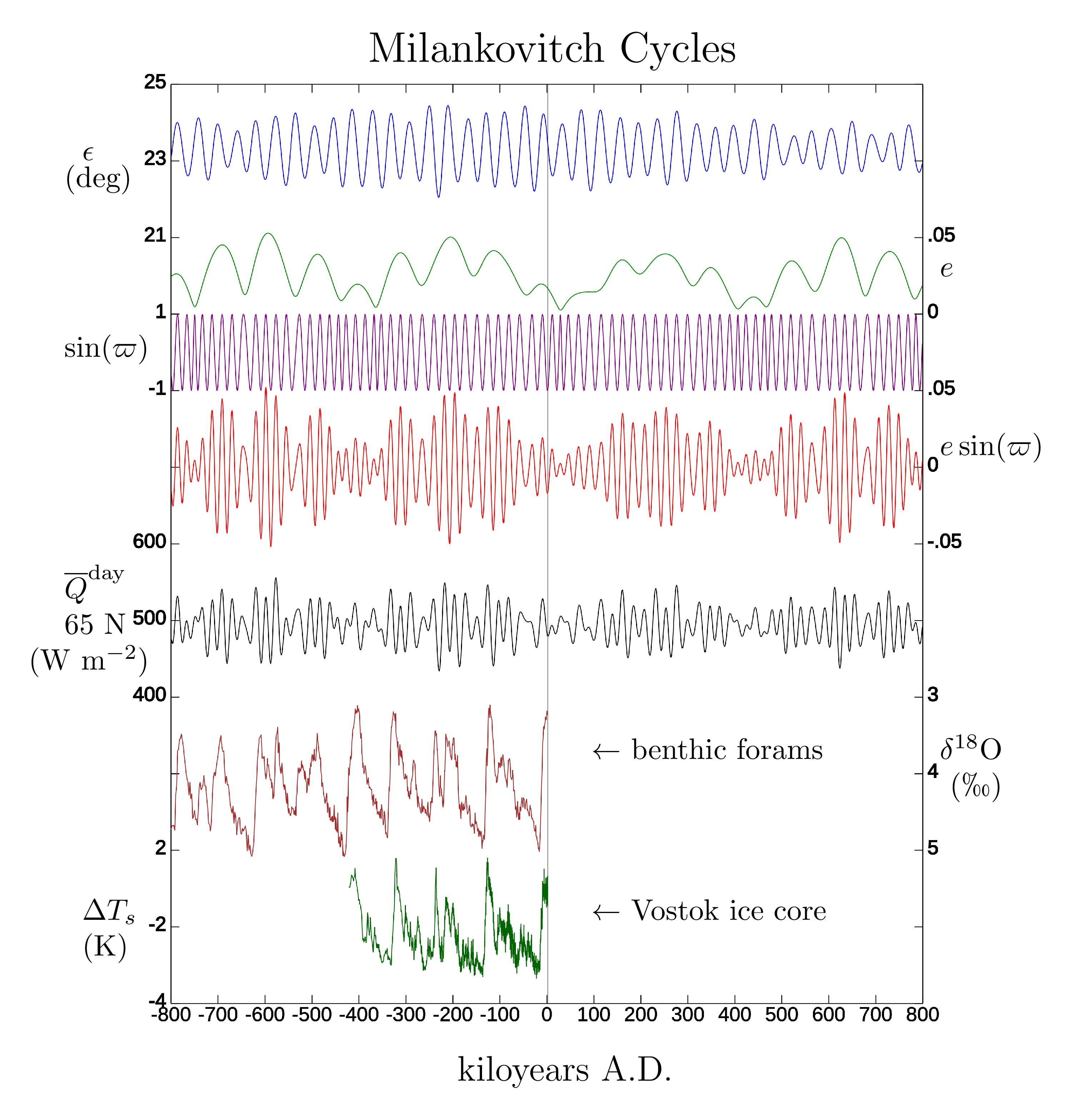
Past and future Milankovitch cycles via VSOP model: Graphic shows variations in five orbital elements: Axial tilt or obliquity (ε). Eccentricity (e). Longitude of perihelion (sin(ϖ)). Precession index (e sin(ϖ)); Precession index and obliquity control insolation at each latitude: Daily-average insolation at top of atmosphere on summer solstice ($\overline{Q}^{\mathrm{day} }$) at 65° N; Ocean sediment and Antarctic ice strata record ancient sea levels and temperatures: Benthic forams (57 widespread locations) Vostok ice core (Antarctica); Vertical gray line shows present (2000 CE)

Milankovitch cycles describe the collective effects of changes in the Earth's movements on its climate over thousands of years. The phenomenon is named after the Serbian geophysicist and astronomer Milutin Milanković. In the 1920s, he provided a more definitive and quantitative analysis than James Croll's earlier hypothesis that variations in eccentricity, axial tilt, and precession combined to result in cyclical variations in the intra-annual and latitudinal distribution of solar radiation at the Earth's surface, and that this orbital forcing strongly influenced the Earth's climatic patterns.

== Earth movements ==
The Earth's rotation around its axis, and revolution around the Sun, evolve over time due to gravitational interactions with other bodies in the Solar System. The variations are complex, but a few cycles are dominant.

The Earth's orbit varies between nearly circular and mildly elliptical (its eccentricity varies). When the orbit is more elongated, there is more variation in the distance between the Earth and the Sun, and in the amount of solar radiation, at different times in the year. In addition, the tilt of the Earth's axis (its obliquity) changes slightly. A greater tilt makes the seasons more extreme. Finally, the direction in the fixed stars pointed to by the Earth's axis changes (axial precession), while the Earth's elliptical orbit around the Sun rotates (apsidal precession). The combined effect of precession with eccentricity is that proximity to the Sun occurs during different astronomical seasons.

Milankovitch studied changes in these movements of the Earth, which alter the amount and location of solar radiation reaching the Earth. This is known as solar forcing (an example of radiative forcing). Milankovitch emphasized the changes experienced at 65° north due to the great amount of land at that latitude. Land masses change surface temperature more quickly than oceans, mainly because convective mixing between shallow and deeper waters keeps the ocean surface relatively cooler. Similarly, the very large thermal inertia of the global ocean delays changes to Earth's average surface temperature when gradually driven by other forcing factors.

=== Orbital eccentricity ===
Circular orbit, no eccentricity

Example orbit with 0.5 eccentricity. Earth's orbit is much less eccentric.

The Earth's orbit approximates an ellipse. Eccentricity measures the departure of this ellipse from circularity. The shape of the Earth's orbit varies between nearly circular (the eccentricity of a perfect circle is zero) and mildly elliptical (highest eccentricity was 0.0679 in the last 250 million years). Using e = 0.0679 and a = 1 AU: Perihelion ≈ 140 million km and Aphelion ≈ 160 million km, with a variance of ≈ 20 million km. This would mean a 13% variation in solar distance (and ~30% variation in solar intensity due to the inverse-square law), much more pronounced than today's ~3–7% intensity change.

Earth's eccentricity's geometric or logarithmic mean is 0.0019. The major component of these variations occurs with a period of 405,000 years (eccentricity variation of ±0.012). Other components have 95,000-year and 124,000-year cycles (with a beat period of 400,000 years). They loosely combine into a 100,000-year cycle (variation of −0.03 to +0.02). The present eccentricity is 0.0167 and decreasing.

Eccentricity varies primarily due to the gravitational pull of Jupiter and Saturn. The semi-major axis of the orbital ellipse, however, remains unchanged; according to perturbation theory, which computes the evolution of the orbit, the semi-major axis is invariant. The orbital period (the length of a sidereal year) is also invariant, because according to Kepler's third law, it is determined by the semi-major axis. Longer-term variations are caused by interactions involving the perihelia and nodes of the planets Mercury, Venus, Earth, Mars, and Jupiter.

==== Effect on temperature ====
The semi-major axis of Earth's orbit is functionally constant. Therefore, when Earth's orbit becomes more eccentric, the semi-minor axis shortens. This increases the magnitude of seasonal changes.

The relative increase in solar irradiation at closest approach to the Sun (perihelion) compared to the irradiation at the furthest distance (aphelion) is slightly larger than twice the eccentricity. For Earth's current orbital eccentricity, incoming solar radiation varies by about 6.8%, while the distance from the Sun currently varies by only 3.4% (5.1 million km or 3.2 million mi or 0.034 au).

Perihelion presently occurs around 3 January, while aphelion is around 4 July. When the orbit is at its most eccentric, the amount of solar radiation at perihelion will be about 23% more than at aphelion. However, the Earth's eccentricity is so small (at least at present) that the variation in solar irradiation is a minor factor in seasonal climate variation, compared to axial tilt and even compared to the relative ease of heating the larger land masses of the northern hemisphere.

==== Effect on lengths of seasons ====
Season durations
| Year | Northern hemisphere | Southern hemisphere | Date (UTC) | Season duration |
|---|---|---|---|---|
| 2005 | Winter solstice | Summer solstice | 21 December 2005 18:35 | 88.99 days |
| 2006 | Spring equinox | Autumn equinox | 20 March 2006 18:26 | 92.75 days |
| 2006 | Summer solstice | Winter solstice | 21 June 2006 12:26 | 93.65 days |
| 2006 | Autumn equinox | Spring equinox | 23 September 2006 4:03 | 89.85 days |
| 2006 | Winter solstice | Summer solstice | 22 December 2006 0:22 | 88.99 days |
| 2007 | Spring equinox | Autumn equinox | 21 March 2007 0:07 | 92.75 days |
| 2007 | Summer solstice | Winter solstice | 21 June 2007 18:06 | 93.66 days |
| 2007 | Autumn equinox | Spring equinox | 23 September 2007 9:51 | 89.85 days |
| 2007 | Winter solstice | Summer solstice | 22 December 2007 06:08 | |

The seasons are quadrants of the Earth's orbit, marked by the two solstices and the two equinoxes. Kepler's second law states that a body in orbit traces equal areas over equal times; its orbital velocity is highest around perihelion and lowest around aphelion. The Earth spends less time near perihelion and more time near aphelion. This means that the lengths of the seasons vary. Perihelion currently occurs around 3 January, so the Earth's greater velocity shortens winter and autumn in the northern hemisphere, and summer and spring in the southern hemisphere. Summer in the northern hemisphere is 4.66 days longer than winter, and spring is 2.9 days longer than autumn. In the southern hemisphere, this is the reverse, winter is 4.66 days longer than summer, and autumn is 2.9 days longer than spring. Greater eccentricity increases the variation in the Earth's orbital velocity. Currently, however, the Earth's orbit is becoming less eccentric (more nearly circular). This will make the seasons in the immediate future more similar in length.

=== Axial tilt (obliquity) ===
22.1–24.5° range of Earth's obliquity

The angle of the Earth's axial tilt with respect to the orbital plane (the obliquity of the ecliptic) varies between 22.1° and 24.5°, over a cycle of about 41,000 years. The current tilt is 23.446°, roughly halfway between its extreme values. The tilt last reached its maximum in 8,700 BCE, which correlates with the beginning of the Holocene, the current geological epoch. It is now in the decreasing phase of its cycle, and will reach its minimum around the year 11,800 CE. Increased tilt increases the amplitude of the seasonal cycle in insolation, providing more solar radiation in each hemisphere's summer and less in winter. However, these effects are not uniform everywhere on the Earth's surface. Increased tilt increases the total annual solar radiation at higher latitudes, and decreases the total closer to the equator.

The current trend of decreasing tilt, by itself, will promote milder seasons (warmer winters and colder summers), as well as an overall cooling trend. Because most of the planet's snow and ice lies at high latitude, decreasing tilt may encourage the termination of an interglacial period (and lead to an overall cooler climate) and the onset of a glacial period for two reasons: 1) there is less overall summer insolation, and 2) there is less insolation at higher latitudes (which melts less of the previous winter's snow and ice).

=== Axial precession ===
Axial precessional movement

Axial precession is the trend in the direction of the Earth's axis of rotation relative to the fixed stars, with a period of about 25,700 years. Also known as the precession of the equinoxes, this motion means that eventually Polaris will no longer be the north pole star. This precession is caused by the tidal forces exerted by the Sun and the Moon on the rotating Earth; both contribute roughly equally to this effect.

Currently, perihelion occurs during the southern hemisphere's summer. This means that solar radiation due to both the axial tilt inclining the southern hemisphere toward the Sun, and the Earth's proximity to the Sun, will reach maximum during the southern summer and reach minimum during the southern winter. These effects on heating are thus additive, which means that seasonal variation in irradiation of the southern hemisphere is more extreme. In the northern hemisphere, these two factors reach maximum at opposite times of the year: the north is tilted toward the Sun when the Earth is furthest from the Sun. The two effects work in opposite directions, resulting in less extreme variations in insolation.

In about 13,000 years, the north pole will be tilted toward the Sun when the Earth is at perihelion. Axial tilt and orbital eccentricity will both contribute their maximum increase in solar radiation during the northern hemisphere's summer. Axial precession will promote more extreme variation in irradiation of the northern hemisphere and less extreme variation in the south. When the Earth's axis is aligned such that aphelion and perihelion occur near the equinoxes, axial tilt will not be aligned with or against eccentricity.

=== Apsidal precession ===
Planets orbiting the Sun follow elliptical (oval) orbits that rotate gradually over time (apsidal precession). The eccentricity of this ellipse, as well as the rate of precession, are exaggerated for visualization.

The orbital ellipse itself precesses in space, in an irregular fashion, completing a full cycle in about 112,000 years relative to the fixed stars. Apsidal precession occurs in the plane of the ecliptic and alters the orientation of the Earth's orbit relative to the ecliptic. This happens primarily as a result of interactions with Jupiter and Saturn. Smaller contributions are also made by the sun's oblateness and by the effects of general relativity that are well known for Mercury.

Apsidal precession combines with the 25,700-year cycle of axial precession (see above) to vary the position in the year that the Earth reaches perihelion. Apsidal precession shortens this period to about 21,000 years, at present. According to a relatively old source (1965), the average value over the last 300,000 years was 23,000 years, varying between 20,800 and 29,000 years.

Effects of precession on the seasons (using the Northern Hemisphere terms)

As the orientation of Earth's orbit changes, each season will gradually start earlier in the year. Precession means the Earth's nonuniform motion (see above) will affect different seasons. Winter, for instance, will be in a different section of the orbit. When the Earth's apsides (extremes of distance from the sun) are aligned with the equinoxes, the length of spring and summer combined will equal that of autumn and winter. When they are aligned with the solstices, the difference in the length of these seasons will be greatest.

=== Orbital inclination ===
The inclination of Earth's orbit drifts up and down relative to its present orbit. This three-dimensional movement is known as "precession of the ecliptic" or "planetary precession". Earth's current inclination relative to the invariable plane (the plane that represents the angular momentum of the Solar System—approximately the orbital plane of Jupiter) is 1.57°. Milankovitch did not study planetary precession. It was discovered more recently and measured, relative to Earth's orbit, to have a period of about 70,000 years. When measured independently of Earth's orbit, but relative to the invariable plane, however, precession has a period of about 100,000 years. This period is very similar to the 100,000-year eccentricity period. Both periods closely match the 100,000-year pattern of glacial events.

== Theory constraints ==
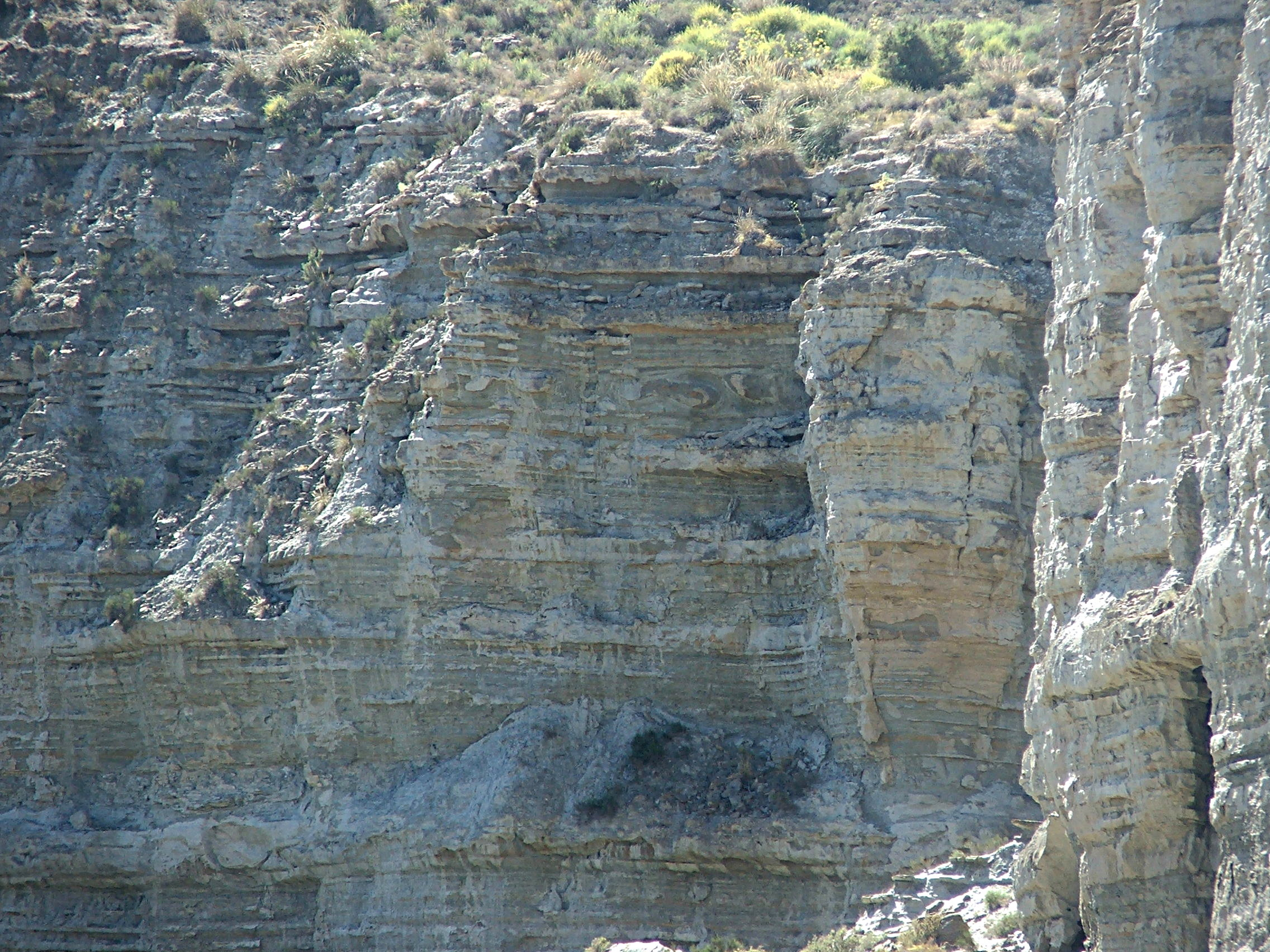
Tabernas Desert, Spain: Cycles can be observed in the colouration and resistance of different sediment strata

Materials taken from the Earth have been studied to infer the cycles of past climate. Antarctic ice cores contain trapped air bubbles whose ratios of different oxygen isotopes are a reliable proxy for global temperatures around the time the ice was formed. Study of this data concluded that the climatic response documented in the ice cores was driven by northern hemisphere insolation as proposed by the Milankovitch hypothesis. Similar astronomical hypotheses had been advanced in the 19th century by Joseph Adhemar, James Croll, and others.

Analysis of deep-ocean cores and of lake depths, and a seminal paper by Hays, Imbrie, and Shackleton provide additional validation through physical evidence. Climate records contained in a 1,700 ft (520 m) core of rock drilled in Arizona show a pattern synchronized with Earth's eccentricity, and cores drilled in New England match it, going back 215 million years.

=== 100,000-year issue ===
Of all the orbital cycles, Milankovitch believed that obliquity had the greatest effect on climate, and that it did so by varying the summer insolation in northern high latitudes. Therefore, he deduced a 41,000-year period for ice ages. However, subsequent research has shown that ice age cycles of the Quaternary glaciation over the last million years have been at a period of 100,000 years, which matches the eccentricity cycle. Various explanations for this discrepancy have been proposed, including frequency modulation or various feedbacks (from ocean circulation, carbon dioxide and ice sheet dynamics). Some models can reproduce the 100,000-year cycles as a result of non-linear interactions between small changes in the Earth's orbit and internal oscillations of the climate system. In particular, the mechanism of the stochastic resonance was originally proposed in order to describe this interaction.

Jung-Eun Lee of Brown University proposes that precession changes the amount of energy that Earth absorbs, because the southern hemisphere's greater ability to grow sea ice reflects more energy away from Earth. Moreover, Lee says, "Precession only matters when eccentricity is large. That's why we see a stronger 100,000-year pace than a 21,000-year pace." Some others have argued that the length of the climate record is insufficient to establish a statistically significant relationship between climate and eccentricity variations.

=== Transition changes ===
Variations of cycle times, curves determined from ocean sediments

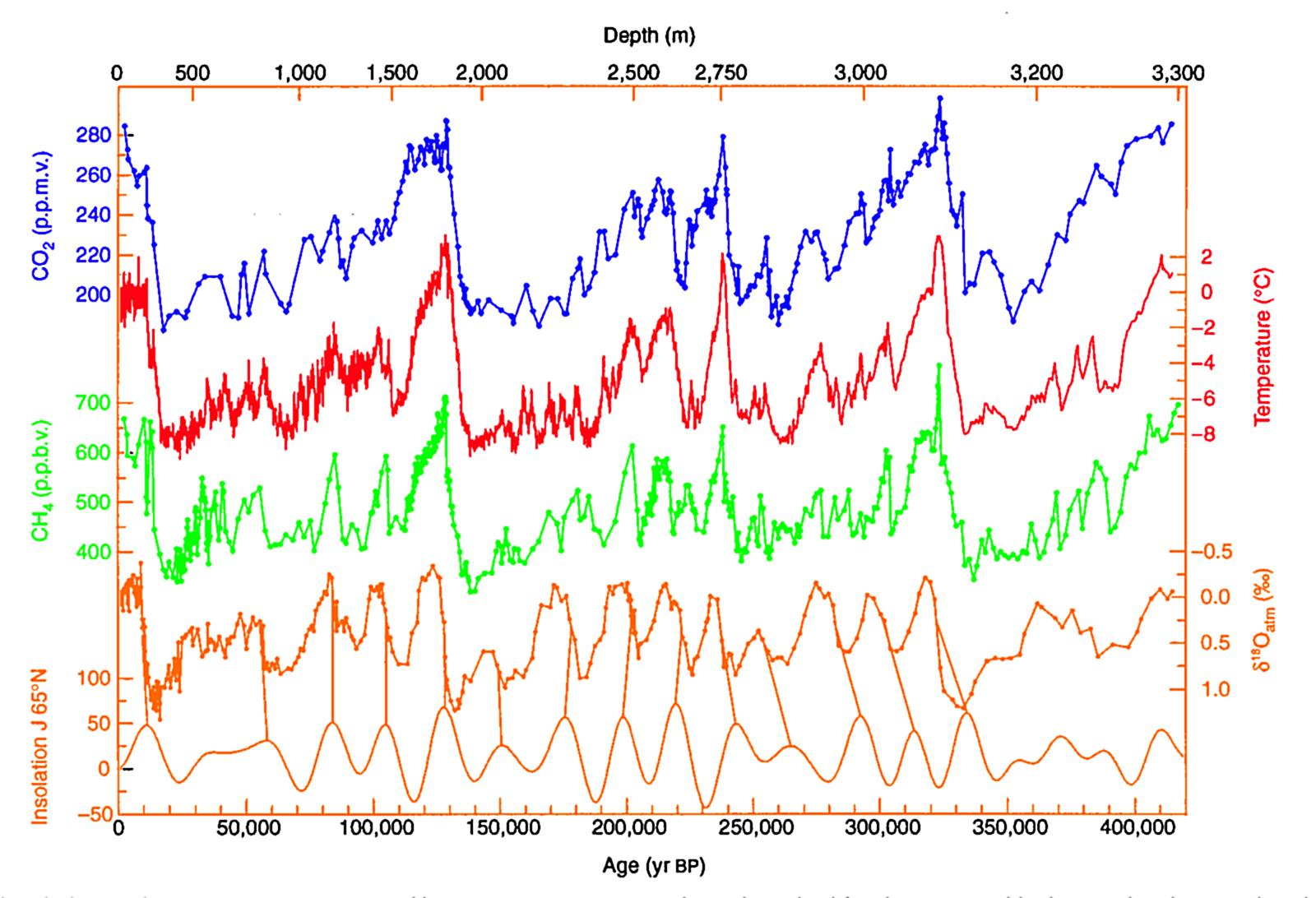
420,000 years of ice core data from Vostok, Antarctica research station, with more recent times on the left

From 1–3 million years ago, climate cycles matched the 41,000-year cycle in obliquity. After one million years ago, the Mid-Pleistocene Transition (MPT) occurred with a switch to the 100,000-year cycle matching eccentricity. The transition problem refers to the need to explain what changed one million years ago. The MPT can now be reproduced in numerical simulations that include a decreasing trend in carbon dioxide and glacially induced removal of regolith.

=== Interpretation of unsplit peak variances ===
Even the well-dated climate records of the last million years do not exactly match the shape of the eccentricity curve. Eccentricity has component cycles of 95,000 and 125,000 years. Some researchers, however, say the records do not show these peaks, but only indicate a single cycle of 100,000 years. The split between the two eccentricity components, however, is observed at least once in a drill core from the 500-million year-old Scandinavian Alum Shale.

=== Unsynced stage five observation ===
Deep-sea core samples show that the interglacial interval known as marine isotope stage 5 began 130,000 years ago. This is 10,000 years before the solar forcing that the Milankovitch hypothesis predicts. (This is also known as the causality problem because the effect precedes the putative cause.)

== Present and future conditions ==
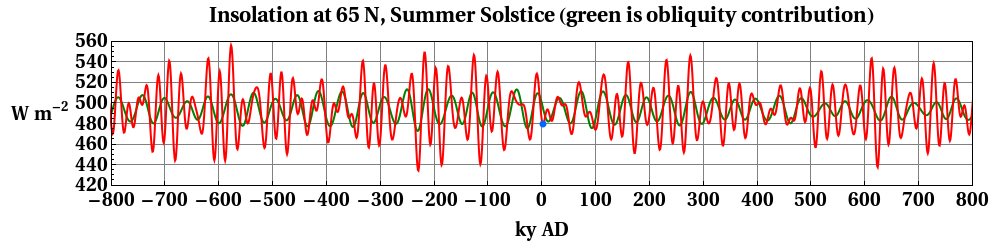
Past and future estimations of daily average insolation at top of the atmosphere on the day of the summer solstice, at 65° N latitude. The green curve is with eccentricity e hypothetically set to 0. The red curve uses the actual (predicted) value of e; the blue dot indicates current conditions (2000 CE).

Since orbital variations are predictable, any model that relates orbital variations to climate can be run forward to predict future climate, with two caveats: the mechanism by which orbital forcing influences climate is not definitive; and non-orbital effects can be important (for example, the human impact on the environment principally increases greenhouse gases resulting in a warmer climate).

An often-cited 1980 orbital model by Imbrie predicted "the long-term cooling trend that began some 6,000 years ago will continue for the next 23,000 years." Another work suggests that solar insolation at 65° N will reach a peak of 460 W·m^{−2} in around 6,500 years, before decreasing back to current levels (450 W·m^{−2}) in around 16,000 years. Earth's orbit will become less eccentric for about the next 100,000 years, so changes in this insolation will be dominated by changes in obliquity, and should not decline enough to permit a new glacial period in the next 50,000 years.

== Other celestial bodies ==
=== Mars ===
Since 1972, speculation sought a relationship between the formation of Mars' alternating bright and dark layers in the polar layered deposits and the planet's orbital climate forcing. In 2002, Laska, Levard, and Mustard showed ice-layer radiance, as a function of depth, correlate with the insolation variations in summer at the Martian north pole, similar to palaeoclimate variations on Earth. They also showed Mars' precession had a period of about 51 kyr, obliquity had a period of about 120 kyr, and eccentricity had a period ranging between 95 and 99 kyr. In 2003, Head, Mustard, Kreslavsky, Milliken, and Marchant proposed Mars was in an interglacial period for the past 400 kyr, and in a glacial period between 400 and 2100 kyr, due to Mars' obliquity exceeding 30°. At this extreme obliquity, insolation is dominated by the regular periodicity of Mars' obliquity variation. Fourier analysis of Mars' orbital elements, show an obliquity period of 128 kyr, and a precession index period of 73 kyr.

Mars has no moon large enough to stabilize its obliquity, which has varied from 10 to 70 degrees. This would explain recent observations of its surface compared to evidence of different conditions in its past, such as the extent of its polar caps.

=== Outer Solar system ===
Saturn's moon Titan has a cycle of approximately 60,000 years that could change the location of the methane lakes. Neptune's moon Triton has a variation similar to Titan's, which could cause its solid nitrogen deposits to migrate over long time scales.

=== Exoplanets ===
Scientists using computer models to study extreme axial tilts have concluded that high obliquity could cause extreme climate variations, and while that would probably not render a planet uninhabitable, it could pose difficulty for land-based life in affected areas. Most such planets would nevertheless allow development of both simple and more complex lifeforms. Although the obliquity they studied is more extreme than Earth ever experiences, there are scenarios 1.5 to 4.5 billion years from now, as the Moon's stabilizing effect lessens, where obliquity could leave its current range and the poles could eventually point almost directly at the Sun.

== See also ==
- Cenomanian-Turonian boundary event § Milankovitch cycles
- Supercontinent § Milankovitch cycles
- List of gravitationally rounded objects of the Solar System#Planets, for planets precession timeperiods

== Bibliography ==
- Edvardsson S, Karlsson KG, Engholm M (2002). "Accurate spin axes and solar system dynamics: Climatic variations for the Earth and Mars". Astronomy and Astrophysics. 384 (2): 689–701. Bibcode:2002A&A...384..689E. doi:10.1051/0004-6361:20020029. This is the first work that investigated the derivative of the ice volume in relation to insolation (page 698).
- In Ancient Rocks Scientists See a Climate Cycle Working Across Deep Time (Columbia Climate School, Kevin Krajick, 7 May 2018)
- Kaufmann RK, Juselius K (2016). "Testing competing forms of the Milankovitch hypothesis". Paleoceanography. 31 (2): 286–297. Bibcode:2016PalOc..31..286K. doi:10.1002/2014PA002767..
- Pälike H, Norris RD, Herrle JO, Wilson PA, Coxall HK, Lear CH, et al. (December 2006). "The heartbeat of the Oligocene climate system" (PDF). Science. 314 (5807): 1894–8. Bibcode:2006Sci...314.1894P. doi:10.1126/science.1133822. PMID 17185595. S2CID 32334205. "A 13-million-year continuous record of Oligocene climate from the equatorial Pacific reveals a pronounced "heartbeat" in the global carbon cycle and periodicity of glaciations."
- Roe G (2006). "In defense of Milankovitch". Geophysical Research Letters. 33 (24) 2006GL027817: L24703. Bibcode:2006GeoRL..3324703R. doi:10.1029/2006GL027817. S2CID 13230658. This shows that Milankovitch theory fits the data extremely well, over the past million years, provided that we consider derivatives.
- The oldest reference for Milankovitch cycles is: Milankovitch M (1930). Mathematische Klimalehre und Astronomische Theorie der Klimaschwankungen. Handbuch der Klimatologie. Vol. 1 Teil A. von Gebrüder Borntraeger. OCLC 490063906.
- Tying celestial mechanics to Earth's ice age (Physics Today 73 (5), Maslin M. A. 1 May 2020)
- Zachos J, Pagani M, Sloan L, Thomas E, Billups K (April 2001). "Trends, rhythms, and aberrations in global climate 65 Ma to present" (PDF). Science. 292 (5517): 686–93. Bibcode:2001Sci...292..686Z. doi:10.1126/science.1059412. PMID 11326091. S2CID 2365991. Archived from the original (PDF) on 28 November 2022.
  This review article discusses cycles and great-scale changes in the global climate during the Cenozoic Era.
