= International Union for Quaternary Research =

International science organisation

- Abbreviation: INQUA
- Formation: 1928; 98 years ago
- Type: INGO
- Region served: Worldwide
- Official language: English
- President: Thijs Van Kolfschoten (Netherlands)
- Secretary-General: Eniko Magyari (Hungary)
- Parent organization: International Science Council
- Website: INQUA Official website

The International Union for Quaternary Research (INQUA) was founded in 1928. It has members from a number of scientific disciplines who study the environmental changes that occurred during the glacial ages, the last 2.6 million years. One goal of these investigators is to document the timing and patterns in past climatic changes to help understand the causes of changing climates.

INQUA is a member of the International Science Council (ISC). INQUA holds an international congress normally every four years. The congresses serve as an educational forum as well as the opportunity for the various commissions, committees, and working groups to conduct business in person. Past congresses have been held in Copenhagen (1928), Leningrad (Saint Petersburg) (1932), Vienna (1936), Rome (1953), Madrid (1957), Warsaw (1961), Boulder (1965), Paris (1969), Christchurch (1973), Birmingham (1977), Moscow (1982), Ottawa (1987), Beijing (1991), Berlin (1995), Durban (1999), Reno (2003), Cairns (2007), Bern (2011) and Nagoya (2015).

The most recent INQUA Congress (XIX) was held in Rome, Italy, in July 2023. In 2027 the INQUA Congress (XXI) will take place in Lucknow, India between January and February.

== Climate change ==
In 2007, the union issued a statement on climate change in which it reiterated the conclusions of the Intergovernmental Panel on Climate Change (IPCC), and urged all nations to take prompt action in line with the UNFCCC principles:

Human activities are now causing atmospheric concentrations of greenhouse gases - including carbon dioxide, methane, tropospheric ozone, and nitrous oxide - to rise well above pre-industrial levels….Increases in greenhouse gasses are causing temperatures to rise…The scientific understanding of climate change is now sufficiently clear to justify nations taking prompt action….Minimizing the amount of this carbon dioxide reaching the atmosphere presents a huge challenge but must be a global priority.

== INQUA Congress ==
INQUA Congress & Presidents
Nr.	Year	Congress		Term	President		Secretary-General	
21.	2023	Rome	Italy					
20.	2019	Dublin	Ireland	2019-2023	Thijs Van Kolfschoten	Netherlands	Eniko Magyari	Hungary
19.	2015	Nagoya	Japan	2015-2019	Allan Ashworth	United States	Brian M Chase	France
18.	2011	Bern	Switzerland	2011-2015	Margaret Avery	South Africa	Julius Lejju	Uganda
17.	2007	Cairns	Australia					
16.	2003	Reno, Nevada	United States					
15.	1999	Durban	South Africa					
14.	1995	Berlin	Germany					
13.	1991	Beijing	China					
12.	1987	Ottawa	Canada					
11.	1982	Moscow	Soviet Union		Boris Sokolov	Soviet Union		
10.	1977	Birmingham	United Kingdom					
9.	1973	Christchurch	New Zealand					
8.	1969	Paris	France					
7.	1965	Boulder, Colorado	United States					
6.	1961	Warsaw	Poland					
5.	1957	Madrid	Spain					
4.	1953	Rome	Italy		Gian Alberto Blanc	Italy		
3.	1936	Vienna	Austria		Gustav Götzinger	Austria		
2.	1932	Leningrad	Soviet Union		Ivan Gubkin	Soviet Union		
1.	1928	Copenhagen	Denmark		Dmitry Mushketov	Soviet Union		

== INQUA Medals ==
=== Sir Nicholas Shackleton Medal ===
Since 2007 INQUA has awarded biannually the Sir Nicholas Shackleton Medal to an "outstanding young [early-career] Quaternary scientist ... working in any branch of Quaternary science".

Sir Nicholas Shackleton Medal recipients

- 2007 Chris Turney
- 2009 Zenobia Jacobs
- 2011 Yuki Sawai
- 2013 Not awarded
- 2015 Robert E. Kopp
- 2017 Amaelle Landais
- 2019 Qiuzhen Yin
- 2021 Julie Loisel
- 2023 Qiaomei Fu

=== Liu Tungsheng Distinguished Career Medal ===
Since 2011 INQUA has awarded quadrennially the Liu Tungsheng Distinguished Career Medal, awarded to "a senior Quaternary scientist who has made significant and distinguished contributions that have advanced Quaternary science through dedicated service to the international community".

Liu Tungsheng Distinguished Career Medal recipients

- 2011: Stephen C. Porter
- 2015: Ann G. Wintle
- 2019: Nicolas Lancaste
- 2023: Denis-Didier Rousseau

INQUA Distinguished Service Medal recipients

- 2015: Nathaniel W. Rutter
- 2019: Marie-France Loutre
- 2023: Norm Catto

== See also ==
- Quaternary science
