= Robert Millner Shackleton =

British field geologist (1909–2001)

- Born: 30 December 1909; Purley, Surrey
- Died: 3 May 2001 (aged 91)
- Education: University of Liverpool (BSc)
- Awards: Murchison Medal (1970)
- Scientific career
- Fields: Geology
- Workplaces: Imperial College London, University of Liverpool

Notes
- Father of Nicholas Shackleton

Robert Millner Shackleton FRS (30 December 1909 – 3 May 2001) was a British field geologist who developed an interest in the geology of East Africa. He initiated structural studies across orogenic belts in Tanzania-Zambia-Malawi (in the late 1960s), major studies across the Limpopo Belt and adjacent Archaean greenstone belts of Zimbabwe-Botswana-South Africa (in the 1970s) and projects across the orogenic systems of Egypt, Sudan and Kenya (in the early 1980s). Just prior to his death he was working on a detailed compilation of the Precambrian geology of East Africa. At the age of 75 he led a Royal Society geological traverse across Tibet, in collaboration with the Academica Sinica, Beijing.

Born in Purley, Surrey, he was educated at the Quakers' Sidcot School in Somerset and the University of Liverpool, graduating BSc in geology with First Class Honours in 1930. He went on to research at Liverpool under P.G.H. Boswell on the geology of the Moel Hebog area of Snowdonia in North Wales (PhD 1934), then won a Beit Fellowship at Imperial College, London, 1932–1934. The next year he was appointed chief geologist to Whitehall Exploration Ltd in Fiji but returned to Imperial College as lecturer in geology in 1936.

In 1940 he was appointed a geologist in the Mining and Geological Department of Kenya, as part of the wartime strategic planning programme. He surveyed widely throughout Kenya producing reports for the Geological Survey of Kenya on the areas of Malikisi, North Kavirondo, Nyeri, the Migori Gold Belt, and Nanyuki and Maralal. His studies extended into the geometry of the orogenic belts of East Africa and the volcanism that produced the Rift System. In 1942 the archaeologist Mary Leakey discovered prehistoric human artefacts at Olorgesailie, a lower Palaeolithic site southwest of Nairobi. In the mid-1940s she and Louis Leakey excavated the site, and Shackleton collaborated with the investigations, preparing geological maps of the area around the Olorgesailie site and the area between Olorgesailie and Ngong.

Shackleton returned to Imperial College in 1945 and was offered a professorship there. However, he thought the department too unmanageable and in 1948 returned to Liverpool as the Herdman Professor of Geology. In his time in the Herdman chair, he re-organised the Liverpool geology department and put it at the forefront of geological research in Britain. In 1962, to increase his opportunities for research in Africa, he took up a chair in the University of Leeds and joined the staff of the Research Institute of African Geology (serving as director from 1965 until retirement). 1970–1971 he was Royal Society Leverhulme Visiting Professor of Geology at the Haile Selassie University, Addis Ababa, Ethiopia. He formally retired in 1975 but was research fellow at the Open University from 1977 until his death and remained active in field geology.

His achievements were recognised by the award of the Silver Medal of the Liverpool Geological Society (1957) and the Murchison Medal of the Geological Society of London (1970), and his election to the Fellowship of the Royal Society (1971). His Royal Society citation recorded that he was "well-known for his contributions to the study of crystalline rocks, more particularly of rock deformation and large scale tectonics."

Of particular importance have been his work on Tertiary volcanics in Kenya, his understanding of the Pre-Cambrian of eastern and central Africa and his accounts of Dalradian structures and deposits".

Shackleton married three times and had five children, including geoscientist Professor Sir Nicholas Shackleton (1937–2006).

The 'Robert Shackleton Award for Outstanding Precambrian Research in Africa' is the flagship award of the Geological Society of Africa.
