= Boreas (journal) =

- Discipline: Quaternary science
- Language: English
- Edited by: Jan A. Piotrowski

Publication details
- History: 1972–present
- Publisher: Wiley-Blackwell
- Frequency: Quarterly
- Impact factor: 2.457 (2012)

Standard abbreviations
- ISO 4: Boreas

Indexing
- CODEN: BRESB3
- ISSN: 0300-9483 (print); 1502-3885 (web)
- OCLC no.: 1773784

Links
- Journal homepage; Online access; Online archive

Boreas is a peer-reviewed academic journal that has been published on behalf of the Collegium Boreas since 1972. The journal covers all branches of quaternary research, including biological and non-biological aspects of the quaternary environment in both glaciated and non-glaciated areas. Formerly published by Taylor & Francis, Boreas has been published by Wiley-Blackwell since 1998. According to the Journal Citation Reports, the journal has a 2012 impact factor of 2.457.

== See also ==
- List of earth and atmospheric sciences journals
- Journal of Quaternary Science
