= Glacial period =

Geological era

A glacial period (alternatively glacial or glaciation) is an interval of time (thousands of years) within an ice age that is marked by colder temperatures and glacier advances. Interglacials, on the other hand, are periods of warmer climate between glacial periods. The Last Glacial Period ended about 15,000 years ago. The Holocene is the current interglacial. A time with no glaciers on Earth is considered a greenhouse climate state.

== Quaternary Period ==
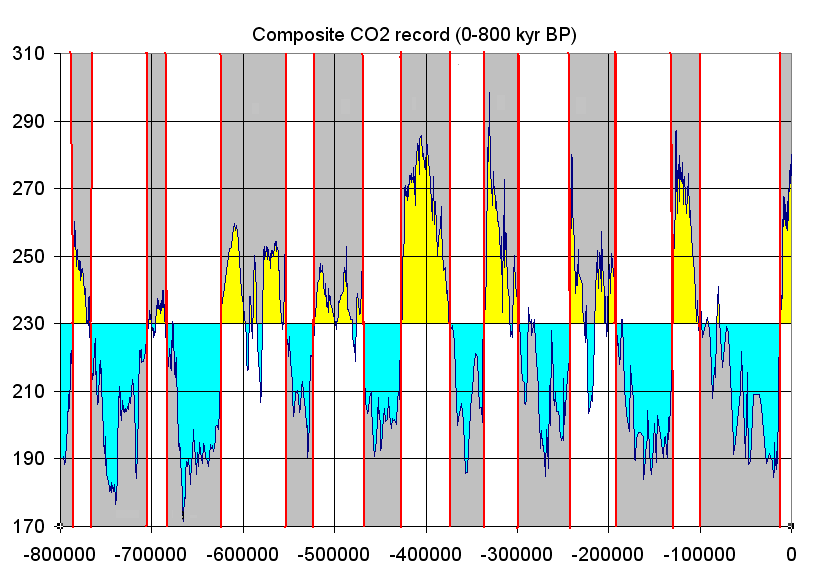
Glacial and interglacial cycles as represented by atmospheric CO_{2}, measured from ice core samples going back 800,000 years. The stage names are part of the North American and the European Alpine subdivisions. The correlation between both subdivisions is tentative.

Within the Quaternary, which started about 2.6 million years before present, there have been a number of glacials and interglacials. At least eight glacial cycles have occurred in the last 740,000 years alone. Changes in atmospheric CO_{2} and associated radiative forcing were among the primary drivers of globally cold glacial and warm interglacial climates, with changes in ocean physical circulation, biological productivity and seawater acid-base chemistry likely causing most of the recorded CO_{2} changes.

== Penultimate Glacial Period ==
The Penultimate Glacial Period (PGP) is the glacial period that occurred before the Last Glacial Period. It began about 194,000 years ago and ended 135,000 years ago, with the beginning of the Eemian interglacial.

== Last Glacial Period ==
The last glacial period was the most recent glacial period within the Quaternary glaciation at the end of the Pleistocene, and began about 110,000 years ago and ended about 11,700 years ago. The glaciations that occurred during the glacial period covered many areas of the Northern Hemisphere and have different names, depending on their geographic distributions: Wisconsin (in North America), Devensian (in Great Britain), Midlandian (in Ireland), Würm (in the Alps), Weichsel (in northern Central Europe), Dali (大荔, in East China), Beiye (北冶, in North China), Taibai (太白, in Shaanxi) Luoji Shan (螺髻山, in southwest Sichuan), Zagunao (杂谷脑, in northwest Sichuan), Tianchi (天池, in the Tian Shan) Jomolungma (ཇོ་མོ་གླང་མ, Mount Everest, in the Himalayas), and Llanquihue (in Chile). The glacial advance reached the Last Glacial Maximum about 26,500 BP. In Europe, the ice sheet reached Northern Germany. Over the last 650,000 years, there have been on average seven cycles of glacial advance and retreat.

== Next glacial period ==
Since orbital variations are predictable, computer models that relate orbital variations to climate can predict future climate possibilities. Work by Berger and Loutre suggests that the current warm climate may last another 50,000 years. The amount of heat trapping (greenhouse) gases being emitted into the Earth's oceans and its atmosphere may delay the next glacial period by an additional 50,000 years.
