= Lennart Bengtsson =

Swedish meteorologist (born 1935)

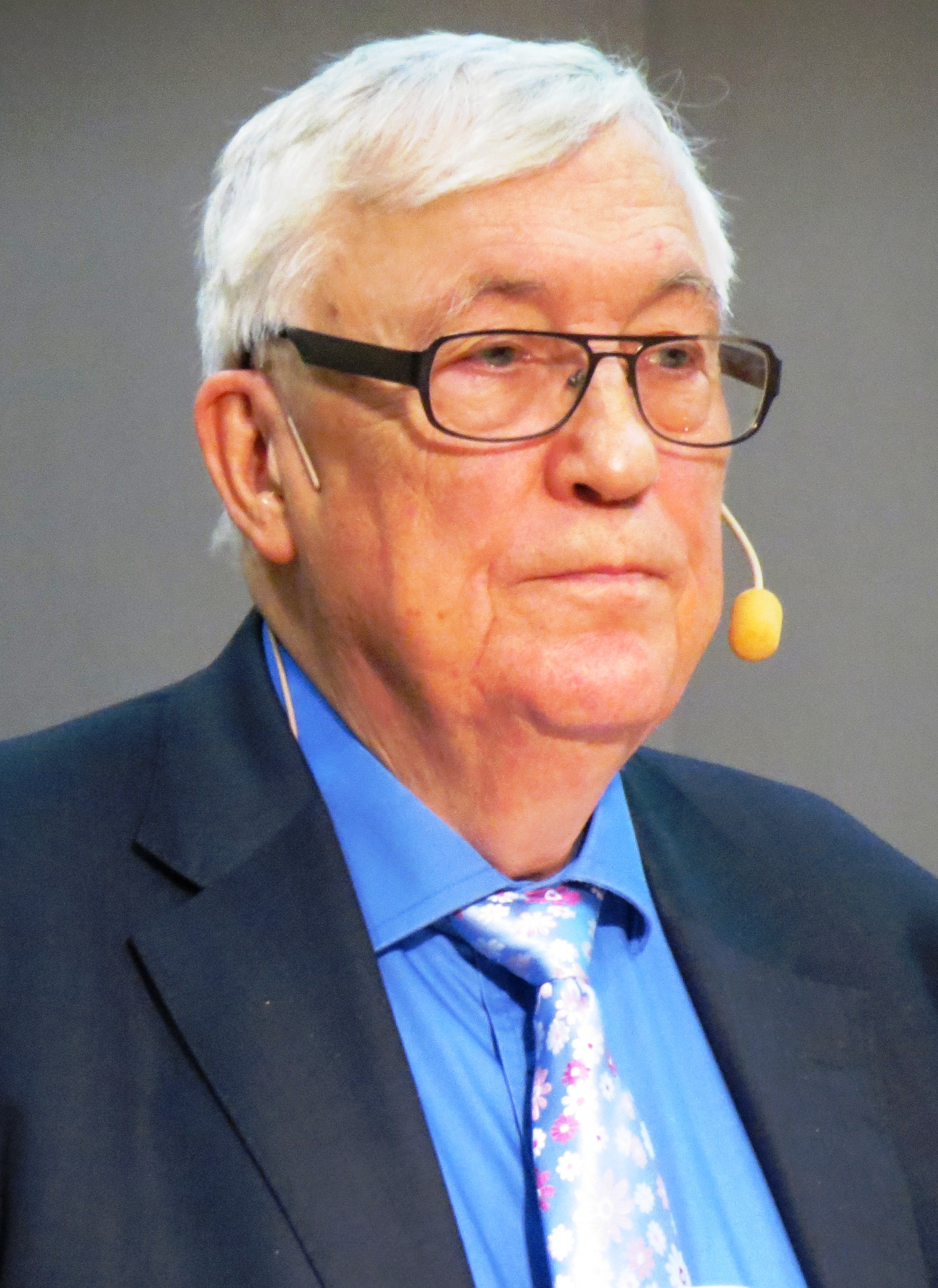
- Bengtsson in 2013
- Born: Trollhättan
- Education: doctorate
- Alma mater: Uppsala University; Stockholm University
- Employer: European Centre for Medium-Range Weather Forecasts (1975–1990); Max Planck Institute for Meteorology (1991–2000); Swedish Meteorological and Hydrological Institute (1961–1974); University of Reading (2001–)
- Awards: International Meteorological Organization Prize (2006); Descartes Prize (2005); Milutin Milankovic Medal (1996)

Lennart Bengtsson (born 5 July 1935) is a Swedish meteorologist. His research interests include climate sensitivity, extreme events, climate variability and climate predictability.

== Career ==
Bengtsson was head of research at the European Centre for Medium-Range Weather Forecasts from 1975 to 1981 and then director until 1990; then director of the Max Planck Institute for Meteorology in Hamburg. He became a recipient of the Milutin Milankovic Medal in 1996. He is now a senior research fellow at the Environmental Systems Science Centre in the University of Reading.

In 2005, he was awarded the René Descartes Prize for Collaborative Research together with Prof. Ola M. Johannessen and Dr. Leonid Bobylev from the Nansen Environmental and Remote Sensing Centre in Norway and Russia for the Climate and Environmental Change in the Arctic project. In 2006, he was awarded the 51st International Meteorological Organization Prize of the World Meteorological Organization for pioneering research in numerical weather prediction. In 2009, he was made an honorary fellow of the Royal Meteorological Society in recognition of his contribution to meteorology.

== Environmental Research Letters rejection of paper in 2014 ==
A draft paper discussing issues of climate sensitivity and uncertainties in the IPCC Fourth and Fifth Assessment Reports in relation to a recent paper by Otto et al. was submitted by Bengtsson and colleagues to Environmental Research Letters in February 2014, and was rejected in mid March after peer review by two referees who found that it did not meet the requirement to "significantly advance knowledge of the field". Following this, Bengtsson and his co-authors then requested the journal to publish it as a shorter "Perspective" article, but in early April the journal's editorial board turned this request down, adding that the paper contained errors and exceeded the normal size limit for "Perspective" pieces. They suggested that the errors should be corrected and a full-length paper resubmitted with a new analysis of the data. The journal said they reject 65–70 percent of papers submitted.

As its lead story on 16 May under the headline "Scientists in cover-up of 'damaging' climate view", The Times said that the paper Bengtsson had submitted to Environmental Research Letters in February had been rejected for what Bengtsson called "activist" reasons. The publishers, the Institute of Physics, stated that the paper "which was the subject of this morning's front page story of The Times, contained errors, in our view did not provide a significant advancement in the field, and therefore could not be published in the journal." They said that "The comments taken from the referee reports were taken out of context and therefore, in the interests of transparency, we have worked with the reviewers to make the full reports available", and put online the referee reports from mid March when the paper had been rejected. Later that day, Bengtsson issued a statement that "I do not believe there is any systematic 'cover-up' of scientific evidence on climate change or that academics' work is being 'deliberately suppressed', as the Times front page suggests. I am worried by a wider trend that science is gradually being influenced by political views".

== Global Warming Policy Foundation ==
In 2014, Bengtsson joined the Global Warming Policy Foundation as a board member, but resigned soon after.
