= Wang Pinxian =

Chinese marine geologist

Wang Pinxian (Chinese: 汪品先; born 14 November 1936 in Suzhou, Jiangsu) is a Chinese marine geologist. He is an academician of the Chinese Academy of Sciences.

== Biography ==
Wang obtained his degree in geology from Moscow State University of the Soviet Union in 1960, and taught at East China Normal University in Shanghai afterwards. In 1972, when the Marine Geology department of East China Normal University merged into Tongji University, Wang was transferred to Tongji.

He was elected a member of the Chinese Academy of Sciences (CAS) in 1991. He was vice president of the International Scientific Committee for Ocean Research (SCOR), 1994–1998. He has served as vice chairman of the Division of Earth Sciences of CAS, president of the Chinese Committee on Ocean Research and vice president of Oceanological and Limnological Society of China.

He has been engaged in research on marine micropaleontology and evolution of its environmental pattern for decades and has made creative contributions to the development of marine geology in China. He started the research on the burial of microfossils in China and has developed the research on paleoceanography considerably.

He was awarded a number of prizes including the National Natural Science Prize and the Ho Leung Ho Lee Prize. His research entitled Distribution of Calcareous Microfossils in the China Seas and its Paleenvironmental Significance won the first prize for the Advancement of Science and Technology awarded by the former State Education Commission and the fourth place for the National Natural Science Award.

His research on Dynamic Progression and Development Trend of the Evolution of Environment in the last 150,000 years in Drought and Semi-drought Areas won the first prize for the Advancement of Science and Technology awarded by Chinese Academy of Science in 1998. In 2007, he was awarded the Milutin Milankovic Medal by the European Geosciences Union.
