= George Kukla =

George Kukla (born Jiří Kukla; March 14, 1930 – May 31, 2014) was a climatologist who was senior research scientist at the Lamont–Doherty Earth Observatory of Columbia University. Kukla was a member of the Czechoslovak Academy of Sciences prior to emigrating to the US, and a pioneer in the field of astronomical climate forcing. In 1972 he became a central figure in convincing the United States government to take the dangers of climate change seriously.

Kukla and geologist, Robley Matthews of Brown University, convened a historic conference, themed: "The Present Interglacial: How and When will it End?" Kukla and Matthews then highlighted the dangers of global cooling in Science magazine and, to President Richard Nixon. The Nixon administration reacted swiftly to their letter, which described calamities such as killer frosts, lower food production and floods, to come. By February 1973, the State Department had established a Panel on the Present Interglacial, which advised Drs. Kukla and Matthews that it "was seized of the matter" and numerous other government agencies were soon included.

In the 1980's, Kukla published evidence of a global warming trend in the atmosphere due to man-made climate change.

Kukla was co-author of a chapter in the book Natural Climate Variability on Decade-to-Century Time Scales published by the National Research Council.

Kukla believed all glacial periods in Earth's history began with global warming (understood as an increase of area-weighted average global mean temperature). He believed Earth's recent warming is mostly natural and will ultimately lead to a new ice age.

He became a recipient of the Milutin Milankovic Medal with John Imbrie in 2003.
