= James D. Hays =

James D. Hays is a professor of Earth and environmental sciences at Columbia University's Lamont–Doherty Earth Observatory. Hays founded and led the CLIMAP project, which collected sea floor sediment data to study surface sea temperatures and paleoclimatological conditions 18,000 years ago.

Hays is best known as a co-author of the 1976 paper in Science, "Variations in the Earth's orbit: Pacemaker of the ice ages." Using ocean sediment cores, the Science paper verified the theories of Milutin Milanković that oscillations in climate can be correlated with Earth's orbital variations of eccentricity, axial tilt, and precession around the Sun (see Milankovitch cycles).

He graduated from Columbia University with a Ph.D. in 1964, Ohio State University with a Master of Science in 1960 and Harvard University with a Bachelor of Arts in 1956. He became a recipient of the Milutin Milankovic Medal in 2010.

== See also ==
- Geology
- Ice ages
