= William Imbrie =

American missionary

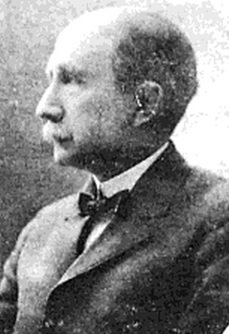
- Born: 1 January 1845; Rahway, New Jersey
- Died: 4 August 1928 (aged 83); Evanston, Illinois
- Known for: Christian Missionary work in Japan

William Miller Kisselman Imbrie (1 January 1845 – 4 August 1928) was an American missionary to Japan.

== Early life ==
William Imbrie was an 1865 graduate of the College of New Jersey (now Princeton University) and an 1870 graduate of Princeton Theological Seminary. He was ordained as a Presbyterian pastor in 1873.

== Missionary in Japan ==
Imbrie arrived in Japan in 1875, where he became a professor of New Testament Exegesis at Meiji Gakuin and later served as senior missionary in Tokyo. He was also the president of the Japanese Book and Tract Society and prepared materials to help Westerners learn the Japanese language. He was instrumental in working for Christian unity in Japan and helped shape what became the Church of Christ in Japan.

In the so-called "Imbrie Affair" of 1890, Japanese students assaulted Imbrie during a baseball game. Imbrie arrived late to a game between students at the First Higher School and Meiji Gakuin, climbing over a hedge to gain admittance since the gates were locked. This action angered the supporters of the First Higher School, some of whom beat him until he fled from the field. While the press likely exaggerated the severity of the beating, the incident inflamed public opinion in the expatriate community. The American embassy complained about the incident, leading to an official apology from representatives of the Japanese government. As Robert Whiting relates, "foreign ministry officials, ranking Ichiko representatives, and several of the students involved paid a visit to Professor Imbrie's residence to beg his forgiveness, which the good professor granted."

Imbrie played a minor diplomatic role during the Russo-Japanese War. The commencement of hostilities in 1904 unsettled Christian missionaries. "At the outbreak of the war between Russia and Japan," reported Galen Fisher, national secretary of the Y.M.C.A. Union of Japan, "fanatical or ignorant Japanese Buddhists started the slogan, 'Buddhism vs. Christianity,' which boded no good to missionaries and the Christian cause in Japan." Later that year, Count Katsura Tarō held an audience with Imbrie to articulate Japan's rationale for the war. In the interview, Katsura denied that any religious motive was at work. "With differences of race or religion…it has nothing to do; and it is carried on in the interests of justice, humanity, and the commerce and civilization of the world." The dissemination of this interview paradoxically cast Japan as a defender of Christian civilization against Russian barbarism.

In 1909, Imbrie was awarded the Fourth Degree of the Order of the Rising Sun by the Japanese government. Imbrie also served as the delegate of the American Presbyterian Mission in Japan (along with Ibuka Kajinosuke) at the 1910 World Missionary Conference in Edinburgh, Scotland.

== Legacy ==
At the time of his death, the Board of Foreign Missions of the Presbyterian Church in the USA commended Imbrie as "one of the oldest, most honored and most beloved of the foreign missionaries of the church...He was again and again relied upon in every crisis of missionary work or the Christian cause in Japan to propose the wisest course of action and to draft statements of policy and of public declaration. No one in the last half century has rendered more notable service in Japan than Dr. Imbrie." Imbrie's former residence at Meiji Gakuin University in Tokyo has been designated the "Imbrie Pavilion" in his honor.

Imbrie's descendants include his grandson John Imbrie, an American paleoceanographer best known for his work on the theory of ice ages.

== Bibliography ==
Books

- Imbrie, William (1889) Handbook of English-Japanese Etymology Tokyo: R. Meiklejohn.
- Imbrie, William (1906) The Church of Christ in Japan: A Course of Lectures. Philadelphia, Westminster Press.
- Imbrie, William (1914) Wa and Ga. Tokyo: Kyo Bun Kwan.
