= Earth systems model of intermediate complexity =

Class of climate models

Earth systems models of intermediate complexity (EMICs) form an important class of climate models, primarily used to investigate the earth's systems on long timescales or at reduced computational cost. This is mostly achieved through operation at lower temporal and spatial resolution than more comprehensive general circulation models (GCMs). Due to the nonlinear relationship between spatial resolution and model run-speed, modest reductions in resolution can lead to large improvements in model run-speed. This has historically allowed the inclusion of previously unincorporated earth-systems such as ice sheets and carbon cycle feedbacks. These benefits are conventionally understood to come at the cost of some model accuracy. However, the degree to which higher resolution models improve accuracy rather than simply precision is contested.

== History ==
Computing power had become sufficiently powerful by the middle of the 20th century to allow mass and energy flow models on a vertical and horizontally resolved grid. By 1955 these advances had produced what is recognisable now as a primitive GCM (Phillips prototype). Even at this early stage, a lack of computing power formed a significant barrier to entry and limitation on model-time.

The next half century saw rapid improvement and exponentially increasing computational demands. Modelling on ever smaller length scales required smaller time steps due to the Courant–Friedrichs–Lewy condition. For example, doubling the spatial resolution increases the computational cost by a factor of 16 (factors of 2 for each spatial dimension and time). As well as working on smaller scales, GCMs began to solve more accurate versions of the Navier–Stokes equations. GCMs also began to incorporate more earth systems and feedback mechanisms, transforming themselves into coupled Earth Systems Models. The inclusion of elements from the cryosphere, carbon cycle and cloud feedbacks was both facilitated and constrained by growth in computing power.

The powerful computers and high cost required to run these "comprehensive" models limited accessibility to many university research groups. This helped drive the development of EMICs. Through judicious parametrisation of key variables, researchers could run climate simulations on less powerful computers, or alternatively much faster on comparable computers. A modern example of this difference in speed can be seen between the EMIC JUMP-LCM and the GCM MIROC4h; the former runs 63,000 times faster than the latter. The decrease in required computing power allowed EMICs to run over longer model times, and thus include earth systems occupying the "slow domain".

Petoukhov's 1980 statistical dynamical model has been cited as the first modern EMIC, but despite development throughout the 1980s, their specific value only achieved wider recognition in the late 1990s with inclusion in IPCC AR2 under the moniker of "Simple Climate Models". It was shortly afterwards at the IGBP congress in Shonnan Village, Japan, in May 1999, where the acronym EMICs was publicly coined by Claussen. The first simplified model to adopt the nomenclature of "intermediate complexity" is now one of the best known: CLIMBER 2. The Potsdam conference under the guidance of Claussen identified 10 EMICs, a list updated to 13 in 2005. Eight models contributed to IPCC AR4, and 15 to AR5.

== Classification ==
As well as "complexity", climate models have been classified by their resolution, parametrisation and "integration". Integration expresses the level of interaction of different components of the earth system. This is influenced by the number of different links in the web (interactivity of coordinates), as well as the frequency of interaction. Because of their speed, EMICs offer the opportunity for highly integrated simulations when compared with more comprehensive ESMs. Four EMIC categorisations have been suggested based on the mode of atmospheric simplification: statistical-dynamical models, energy moisture balance models, quasi-geostrophic models, and primitive equation models. Of the 15 models in the community contribution to the IPCC's fifth assessment report, four were statistical-dynamic, seven energy moisture balance, two quasi-geostrophic and two primitive equations models. To illustrate these categories, a case study for each is given.

=== Statistical-dynamical models: CLIMBER models ===
CLIMBER-2 and CLIMBER-3α are successive generations of 2.5 and 3 dimensional statistical dynamical models. Rather than continuous evolution of solutions to the Navier–Stokes or primitive equations, atmospheric dynamics are handled through statistical knowledge of the system (an approach not new to CLIMBER). This approach expresses the dynamics of the atmosphere as large-scale, long term fields of velocity and temperature. Climber-3α's horizontal atmospheric resolution is substantially coarser than a typical atmospheric GCM at 7.5°x 22.5°.

With a characteristic spatial scale of 1000 km, this simplification prohibits resolution of synoptic level features. Climber-3α incorporates comprehensive ocean, sea ice and biogeochemistry models. Despite these full descriptions, simplification of the atmosphere allows it to operate two orders of magnitude faster than comparable GCMs. Both CLIMBER models offer performances comparable to that of contemporary GCMs in simulating present climates. This is clearly of interest due to the significantly lower computational costs. Both models have been principally used to investigate paleoclimates, particularly ice sheet nucleation.

=== Energy and moisture balance models: UVic ESCM ===
The thermodynamic approach of the UVic model involves simplification of mass transport (with Fickian diffusion) and precipitation conditions. This model can be seen as a direct descendant of earlier energy balance models. These reductions reduce the atmosphere to three state variables, surface air temperature, sea surface temperature and specific humidity. By parametrising heat and moisture transport with diffusion, timescales are limited to greater than annual and length scales to greater than 1000 km. A key result of the thermodynamic rather than fluid dynamic approach is that the simulated climate exhibits no internal variability. Like CLIMBER-3α, it is coupled to a state of the art, 3D ocean model and includes other cutting edge models for sea-ice and land-ice. Unlike CLIMBER, the UVic model does not have significantly coarser resolution than contemporary AOGCMs (3.6°x 1.8°). As such, all computational advantage is from the simplification of atmospheric dynamics.

=== Quasi-geostrophic models: LOVECLIM ===
The quasi-geostrophic equations are a reduction of the primitive equations first written down by Charney. These equations are valid in the case of low Rossby number, signifying only a small contribution from inertial forces. Assumed dominance of the Coriolis and pressure-gradient forces facilitates the reduction of the primitive equations to a single equation for potential vorticity in five variables. LOVECLIM features a horizontal resolution of 5.6° and uses the quasi geostrophic atmosphere model ECBilt. It includes a vegetation feedback module by Brovkin et al. (1997). The model exhibits some significant limitations that are fundamentally linked to its design. The model predicts an Equilibrium Climate Sensitivity of 1.9 °C, at the lower end of the range of GCM predictions. The model's surface temperature distribution is overly-symmetric, and does not represent the northern bias in location of the Intertropical Convergence Zone. The model generally shows lower skill at low latitudes. Other examples of quasi-geostrophic models are PUMA.

=== Primitive equations model: FAMOUS ===
The UK Met-Office's FAMOUS blurs the line between more coarsely resolved comprehensive models and EMICs. Designed to run paleoclimate simulations of the Pleistocene, it has been tuned to reproduce the climate of its parent, HADCM3, by solving the primitive equations written down by Charney. These are of higher complexity than the quasi-geostrophic equations. Originally named ADTAN, preliminary runs had significant biases involving sea ice and the AMOC, which were later corrected through tuning of sea-ice parameters. The model runs at half the horizontal resolution of HADCM3. Atmospheric resolution is 7.5°x5°, and oceanic is 3.75°x 2.5°. Atmosphere-Ocean coupling is done once daily.

== Comparisons and assessments ==
Systematic intercomparison of EMICs has been undertaken since 2000, most recently with a community contribution to the IPCC's fifth assessment report. The equilibrium and transient climate sensitivity of EMICs broadly fell within the range of contemporary GCMs with a range of 1.9 - 4.0 °C (compared to 2.1° - 4.7 °C, CMIP5). Tested over the last millennium, the average response of the models was close to the real trend, however this conceals much wider variation between individual models. Models generally overestimate ocean heat uptake over the last millennium and indicate a moderate slowing. No relationship was observed in EMICs between levels of polar amplification, climate sensitivity, and initial state. The above comparisons to the performance of GCMs and comprehensive ESMs do not reveal the full value of EMICs. Their ability to run as “fast ESMs” allows them to simulate much longer periods, up to many millennia. As well as running on time-scales far greater than available to GCMs, they provide fertile ground for development and integration of systems that will later join GCMs.

== Outlook ==
Possible future directions for EMICs are likely to be in assessment of uncertainties and as a vanguard for incorporation of new earth systems. By virtue of speed they also lend themselves to the creation of ensembles with which to constrain parameters and assess earth systems. EMICs have also recently led in the field of climate stabilisation research. McGuffie and Henderson-Sellers argued in 2001 that in the future, EMICs would be “as important” as GCMs to the climate modelling field - while this has perhaps not been true in the time since that statement, their role has not diminished. Finally, as climate science has come under increasing levels of scrutiny, the ability of models not just to project but to explain has become important. The transparency of EMICs is attractive in this domain, as causal chains are easier to identify and communicate (as opposed to emergent properties generated by comprehensive models).

== See also ==
- Climate model
- General circulation model
