= Quaternary science =

Inter-disciplinary field of study focusing on the Quaternary period

Quaternary science is the subfield of geology which studies the Quaternary Period, commonly known as the ice age. This period spans around 2.58 million years ago to the present. It comprises two epochs: the Pleistocene and the Holocene. It was first studied during the nineteenth century by French scientist Georges Cuvier.

It aims to understand the Earth's environment during these recent epochs, including ecosystem, climate changes, geography, biology, chemistry, and physics. It helps provide a framework to interpret archaeological records.

== History ==
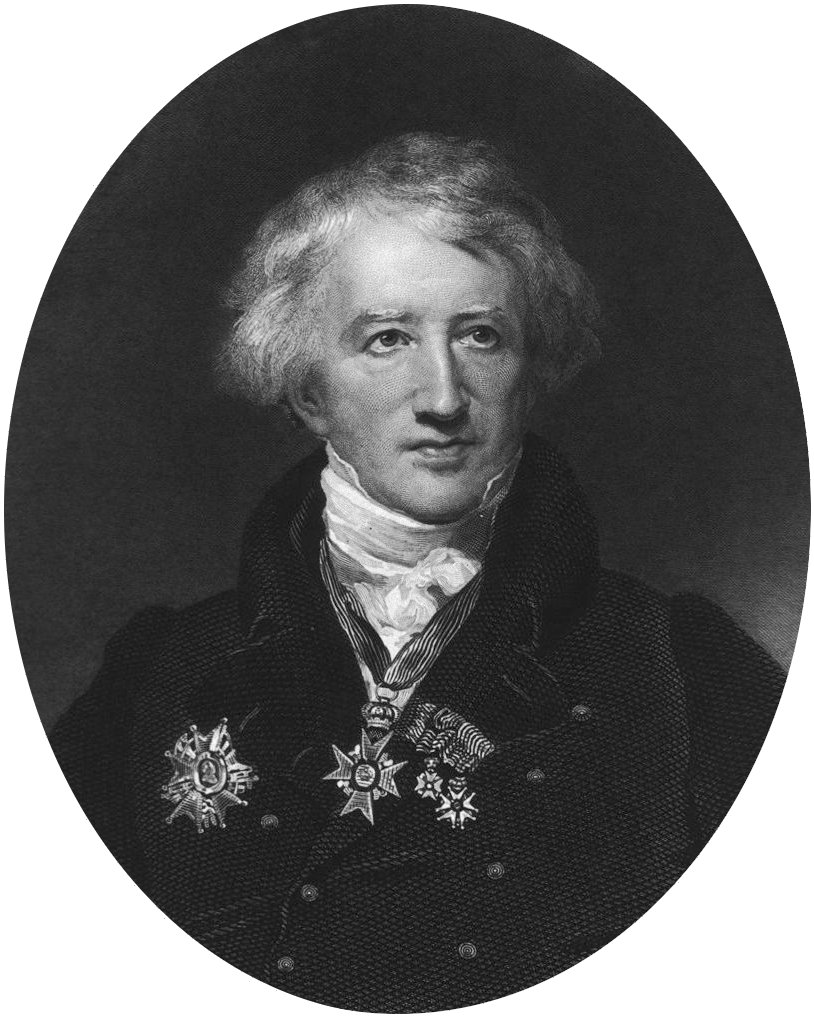
Georges Cuvier

The Quaternary Period is conventionally divided into two epochs: the Pleistocene lit. 'most recent', beginning about 2.58 million years ago, and the Holocene lit. 'wholly modern', which began about 11,700 years ago.

The term Quaternary was first used by Italian engineer Giovanni Arduino in the late eighteenth century to describe the four most recent geologic eras. It is subsequently regarded as "a phase of highly variable climates, with marked periods of time when global temperatures were significantly lower than today and evidence for which was interpreted by Louis Agassiz as indications of a geologically recent 'Great Ice Age'".

In the early nineteenth century French scientist Georges Cuvier proposed that some animals that lived in the Pleistocene epoch were made extinct by some environmental 'revolution' (e.g. some catastrophic flooding events).

Later in the nineteenth century the cause and influence of ice ages also developed. Scottish scientist James Croll recognised the significance of positive feedbacks in the climate system, including of ice-albedo. His theory was also the first to predict the cause of glaciation.

In the twentieth century Milutin Milankovitch, a Serbian mathematician and geophysicist, developed a theory linking long-term climate changes to the motion of the Earth. It offered information about the changes in seasonal "insolation" (incident solar radiation) over millions of years. André Berger, a Belgian climatologist, identified certain time periods where reconstructed insolation deviated significantly from the average. Many of his analyses show that from May to August, there has been a forwarded shift of insolation maximum (higher than average) during the late Quaternary. This feature is known as "insolation signature" and may relate to changes in climate as contemplated by Berger.

Subsequent work in palaeoecology, palaeontology and palaeoclimatology has revealed relationships between changes in the environment and the planet's history during the Quaternary.

Quaternary science has also yielded insight into human colonization and mobility, providing data about the environment and landscape affecting human evolution.

== Biosphere impact ==
Quaternary science includes the study of the impact of climate changes on animals and human, adaptation of living organisms, and human evolution. Adaptation, including genetic modification, allows species to evolve to be able to live in the same place despite climate change.

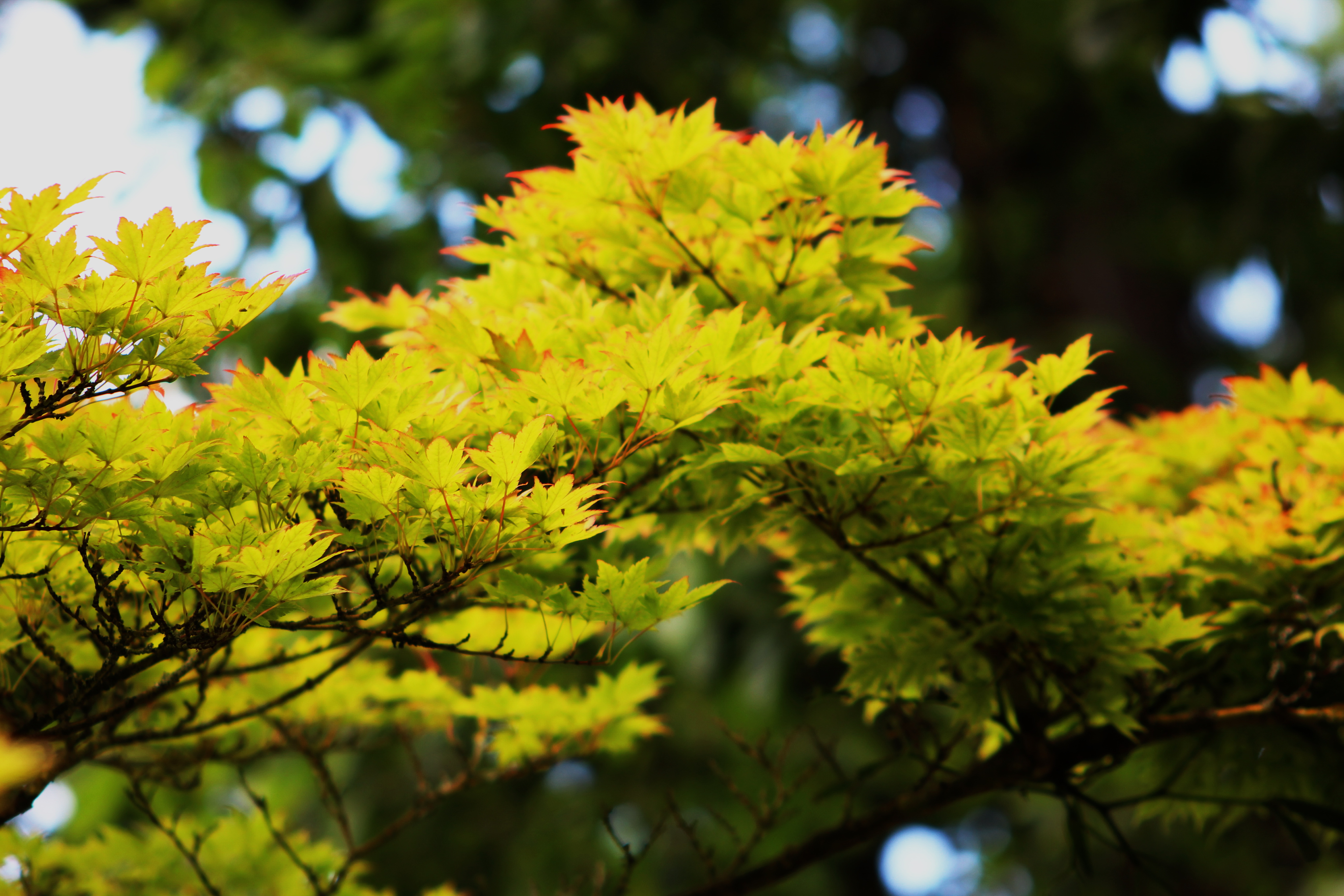
Aceraceae

In one example, the impacts of the pre-Quaternary and Quaternary climatic oscillations on contemporary species richness were explored, particularly diversity pattern of the palm Aceraceae, and the ecological importance of a diverse group of keystone species in their tropical ecosystem. It was discovered that Quaternary climate change has significantly affected the richness of the palm species. Moreover the global constraint on the distribution of the palm family was influenced by the current climate, whereas the climate during the Quaternary only caused a slight constraint.

Climate changes during the Quaternary have impacted the life of many present-day species. In the southeastern United States there was a major impact on the spreading and diversity of the Cactus species of South America. These changes also caused some ecological state shift.

Megafaunal extinction during the late Quaternary caused several ecological state shifts in North and South America. The loss of megafauna species caused ecological change as the Pleistocene gave way to the Holocene. Such species would have been effective ecosystem engineers and such events must have triggered a lasting ecological shift to provide our current ecosystem with more plant species. This indicates that should similar extinctions occur today, current ecosystems would be at risk of disappearing.

== See also ==
- International Union for Quaternary Research
- Palynology
- 100,000-year problem
- Geochronology
