= Jean Jouzel =

French glaciologist and climatologist

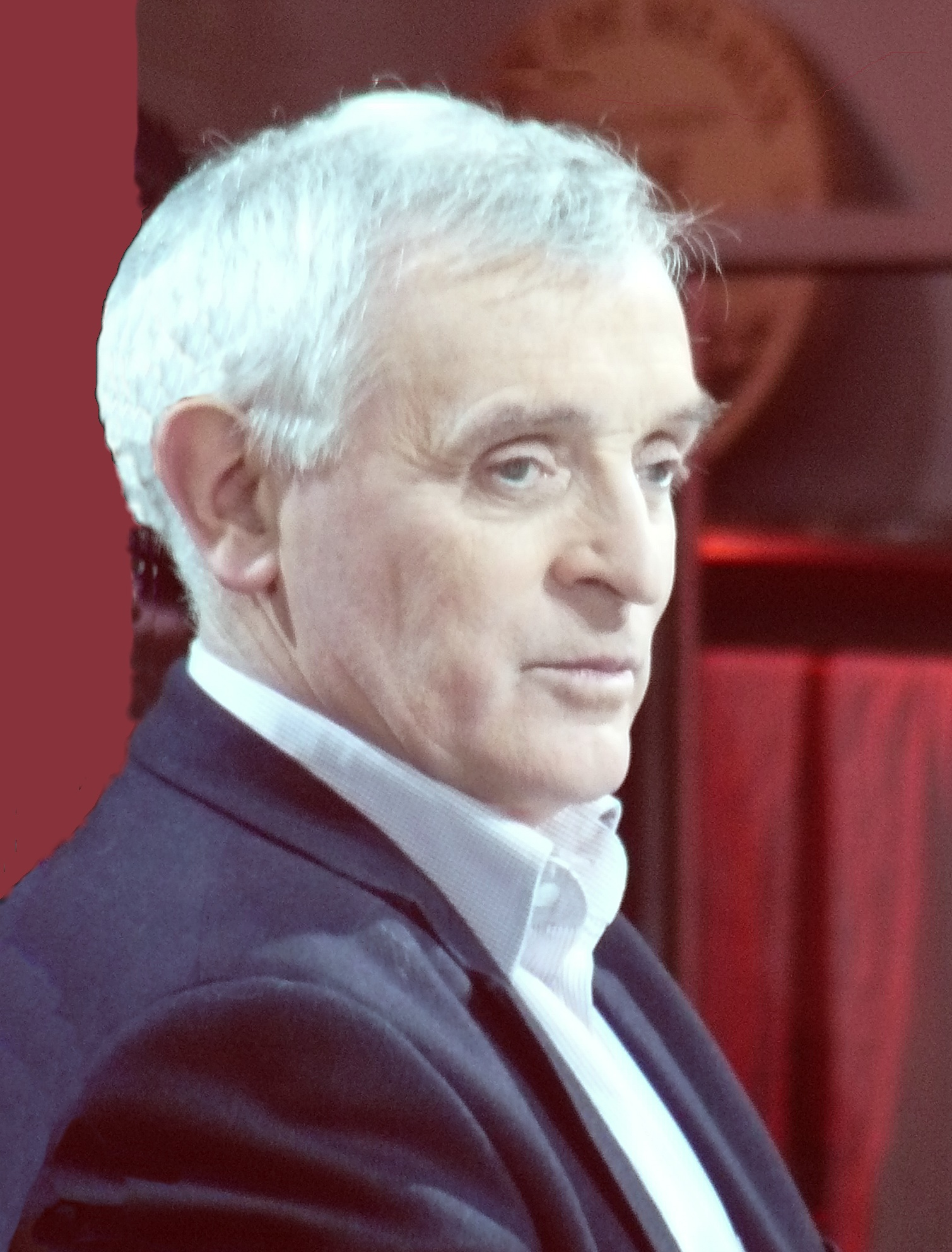
- Jean Jouzel in 2010
- Born: 5 March 1947 (age 79); Janzé, Ille-et-Vilaine, France
- Education: École Supérieure de Chimie Physique Électronique de Lyon
- Known for: Study of Antarctic and Greenland ice
- Awards: Foreign associate of the US National Academy of Sciences, member of the French Academy of Sciences
- Scientific career
- Fields: Glaciology and climatology
- Institutions: CEA, Climate and Environment Sciences Laboratory (LSCE)
- Thesis: Complémentarité des mesures de deutérium et de tritium pour l'étude de la formation des grêlons (1974)
- Doctoral advisor: Étienne Roth

Jean Jouzel (born 5 March 1947) is a French glaciologist and climatologist. He has mainly worked on the reconstruction of past climate derived from the study of the Antarctic and Greenland ice.

== Career ==
Jean Jouzel's career occurred mostly at the CEA (Commissariat à l'Energie Atomique), the French nuclear public organization. In 1991 he became vice-president of LMCE, the CEA laboratory dedicated to environment and climate; in 1995 he became its research director. In 1998 he became director of climate research of the LSCE, which resulted from the fusion of LMCE with another environmental research laboratory. From 2001 to 2008 he was director of the IPSL (Institut Pierre Simon Laplace), a major federative laboratory on climate research in the Paris region, including CEA LMCE-LSCE.

He has focussed his research on isotopic modelling, especially water isotopes for reconstruction of past climate from ice cores. After the 1970s, he combined his effort with the prominent French glaciologist Claude Lorius and he has contributed to the project of deep ice drilling in Antarctica, first in Vostok, then in EPICA (European Project for Ice Coring in Antarctica), which he led from 1995 to 2001, producing 800,000 years of climate history.

== Involvement in IPCC ==
From 2002 to 2015 Jean Jouzel was vice-chair of the Scientific Working Group of the Intergovernmental Panel on Climate Change (IPCC). During his tenure as vice-chair, the IPCC was awarded the Nobel Peace Prize in 2007.

== Political activism ==
Jean Jouzel gradually established himself in France as a media figure in the fight against climate change.

He has supported socialist candidates, including Benoît Hamon for the French Republic presidential elections occurred in 2017 and Anne Hidalgo, for whom he was chair of the support committee for the Paris mayoral elections of 2020.

== Awards ==
Jean Jouzel has received many scientific or public awards.

- 1997 - Milutin Milankovic Medal.
- 2002 - CNRS Gold Medal, the highest French scientific award, jointly with Claude Lorius
- 2003 - Roger Revelle Medal
- 2012 - Vetlesen Prize, shared with Susan Solomon.
- 2015 - Leonardo da Vinci Award from European Academy of Sciences.
- 2016 - Foreign associate of the US National Academy of Sciences.
- 2017 - Member of the French Academy of Sciences.
- 2023 - BBVA Foundation Frontiers of Knowledge Award

== Bibliography ==
- Jouzel, Jean; Claude Lorius; Dominique Raynaud (2012). The white planet : the evolution and future of our frozen world. Princeton, N.J.: Princeton University Press.
