= John Imbrie =

American paleoceanographer (1925-2016)

- Born: July 4, 1925; Penn Yan, New York, U.S.
- Died: May 13, 2016 (aged 90); Providence, Rhode Island, U.S.
- Education: Princeton University (B.S.); Yale University (Ph.D.)
- Awards: Maurice Ewing Medal (1986); Lyell Medal (1991); Vetlesen Prize (1996); Vega Medal (1999); Milutin Milankovic Medal (2003)
- Scientific career
- Fields: Geology, oceanography
- Thesis: Protremate Brachiopods of the Traverse Group 'Devonian' of Michigan (1951)

John Imbrie (July 4, 1925 – May 13, 2016) was an American paleoceanographer best known for his work on the theory of ice ages. He was the grandson of William Imbrie, an American missionary to Japan.

After serving with the 10th Mountain Division in Italy during World War II, Imbrie earned his bachelor's degree from Princeton University. He then went on to receive a Ph.D. from Yale University in 1951. He was elected to the National Academy of Sciences in 1978, and both the American Philosophical Society and the American Academy of Arts and Sciences in 1981. That same year, he was the recipient of a MacArthur Fellowship. He was awarded the Maurice Ewing Medal in 1986 by the AGU and the William H. Twenhofel Medal by the Society for Sedimentary Geology in 1991, the only time the Society has awarded it to a non-member. Imbrie was on the faculty of the Geological Sciences Department at Brown University from 1967, where he held the Henry L. Doherty chair of Oceanography. He later served as Professor Emeritus at Brown.

Imbrie is probably best known as a co-author of the paper in Science in 1976, 'Variations in the Earth's orbit: Pacemaker of the ice ages'. Using ocean sediment cores, the Science paper verified the theories of Milutin Milanković that oscillations in climate over the past few million years are correlated with Earth's orbital variations of eccentricity, axial tilt, and precession around the Sun. These changes are now called the Milankovitch cycles. He became a recipient of the Milutin Milankovic Medal with George Kukla in 2003.

John Imbrie was featured in the video documentary The Last Ridge: The Uphill Battles of the 10th Mountain Division.

He died in Providence, Rhode Island, in 2016 at the age of 90.

== See also ==
- Marine isotope stage
- Ice age
- Timeline of glaciation
