= Climate and Environment Sciences Laboratory =

French climate research laboratory

LSCE
- Climate and Environment Sciences Laboratory
- Laboratoire des sciences du climat et de l'environnement
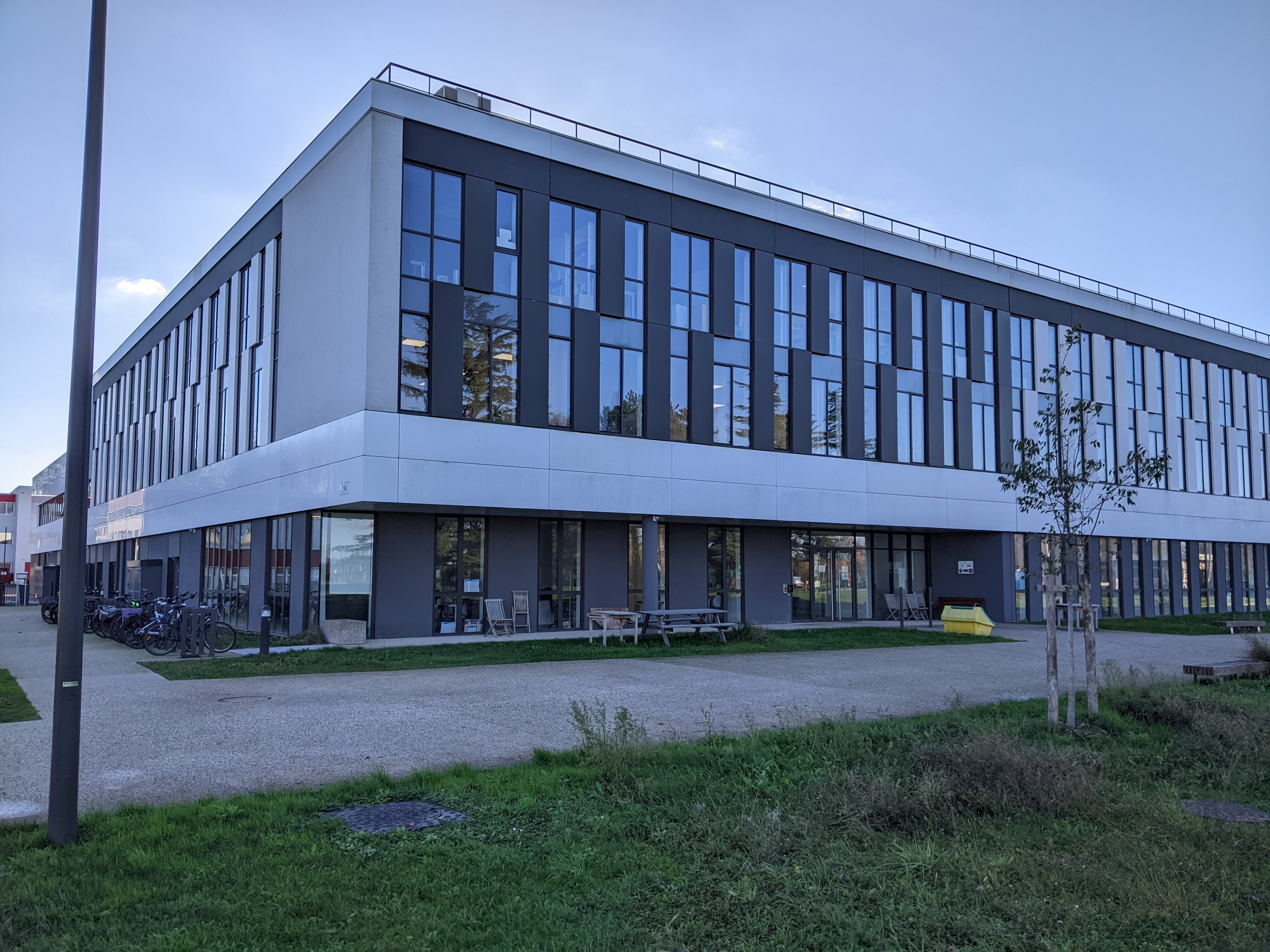
- LSCE at l'Orme-des-Merisiers pictured in 2023

The Climate and Environment Sciences Laboratory (Laboratoire des sciences du climat et de l'environnement, or LSCE) is a French mixed research unit (UMR 8212) between the CNRS, the CEA and Université de Versailles Saint-Quentin, aimed at the study of climate and in particular climate change. It is part of the Institute Pierre Simon Laplace, and located on campuses in l'Orme des Merisiers and Gif-sur-Yvette.

The group plays a prominent role in the framework of the Intergovernmental Panel on Climate Change and includes modellers in glaciology, remote sensing and air quality study.
