= Sellers (surname) =

Sellers is a surname. Notable people with the surname include:

- Ann Henderson-Sellers, climatologist
- Bakari Sellers, American politician
- Basil Sellers, Businessman and Philanthropist
- Brad Sellers, American basketball player
- Brian Henderson-Sellers is Professor of Information Systems
- Brian Sellers, English cricketer
- Charles Coleman Sellers (1903–1980), American historian
- Charles Grier Sellers (1923–2021), American historian
- Cleveland Sellers, American educator and veteran civil rights activist
- David E. Sellers (1938–2025), American architect
- David F. Sellers (1874–1949), United States Navy admiral
- Franklin Sellers (1926–2016), American Reformed Episcopalian bishop
- Frederic Sellers (1893–1979), English lawyer and judge
- George Escol Sellers (1808–1899), American inventor and businessman
- Helen Earle Sellers (1903–1951), American politician
- Ike Sellers (1905–1997), Australian rules footballer
- Isaiah Sellers, American riverboat captain
- J. Henry Sellers (1861–1954), English architect and furniture designer
- Jason Sellers, American country music artist
- Jayden Sellers (born 2007), American football player
- Johnny Sellers, American jockey
- Jonathan Sellers, American murder victim
- LaNorris Sellers (born 2005), American football player
- Larry Sellers, American actor
- Maisie Richardson-Sellers, British actress
- Malcolm A. Sellers, Wisconsin politician
- Maud Sellers, British historian and curator
- Mary Sellers, American actress
- Mike Sellers, American football player
- Michael Sellers (actor), British actor, son of Peter Sellers
- Peter Sellers, British actor
- Phil Sellers, American basketball player
- Piers Sellers, British astronaut
- Randy Sellers (born 1962), American man who has been missing since 1980
- Rex Sellers, New Zealand yachtsman
- Rex Sellers, Australian cricketer
- Ron Sellers, American football player
- Rosabell Laurenti Sellers, Italian-American actress
- Shyanne Sellers (born 2003), American basketball player
- T. J. Sellers (1911–2006), American journalist and publisher from Virginia
- Tom Sellers (athlete), American wheelchair racer
- Tom Sellers (journalist) (1922–2006), American Pulitzer prize-winning journalist from Georgia
- Sellers, a scientist and antagonist in the Xenosaga series
- Scott Sellers, American athlete
- Sean Sellers, American murderer
- Sarah Sellers, American athlete
- Victoria Sellers, Actress, designer and model - daughter of Peter Sellers
- William Sellers, American mechanical engineer, inventor, and machine tool builder

== See also ==
- Sellars
- Henderson-Sellers (disambiguation)
- Seller (surname)
