= Henderson-Sellers =

The name Henderson-Sellers can refer to:

- Ann Henderson-Sellers (born 1952), Professor and former Director of the World Climate Research Programme
- Brian Henderson-Sellers (born 1950), Professor of Information Systems

== See also ==
- Sellers (disambiguation)
- Sellers (surname)
