= Julie Arblaster =

Australian meteorologist

Julie Michelle Arblaster
- Born: 24/06/1890
- Citizenship: Australia
- Education: Macquarie University, University of Colorado, University of Melbourne
- Known for: Intergovernmental Panel on Climate Change
- Awards: Anton Hales Medal, Australian Academy of Science; Priestley Medal. Australian Meteorological and Oceanographic Society
- Scientific career
- Fields: Rocks
- Workplaces: Monash University

External videos
- "Meet Associate Professor Julie Arblaster", Monash University, Jan 21, 2020.
- "Julie Arblaster - Bureau of Meteorology - the effects of ozone on surface climate", Department of Agriculture Water and the Environment, Oct 2, 2012

Julie Michelle Arblaster is an Australian scientist. She is a Professor in the School of Earth, Atmosphere and Environment at Monash University. She was a contributing author on reports for which the Intergovernmental Panel on Climate Change (IPCC) was a co-recipient of the 2007 Nobel Peace Prize. Arblaster was a lead author on Chapter 12 of the IPCC Working Group I contribution to the IPCC Fifth Assessment Report in 2013. She has received the 2014 Anton Hales Medal for research in earth sciences from the Australian Academy of Science, and the 2017 Priestley Medal from the Australian Meteorological and Oceanographic Society. She has been ranked as one of the Top Influential Earth Scientists of 2010-2020, based on citations and discussion of her work.

== Education ==
Arblaster grew up in Swan Hill, in the Loddon Mallee region of Victoria, Australia. She earned a Bachelor of Technology in Atmospheric Science, from Macquarie University, Sydney, and in 1995 was awarded First Class Honours, also from Macquarie University, for her thesis titled "Investigation of the storm tracks of the mid-latitude regions in an AGCM". Her Honours supervisors were Bryant McAvaney and Ann Henderson-Sellers.

From 1997 to 1999 Arblaster studied at the University of Colorado, USA, where she obtained an MSc in Atmospheric and Oceanic Sciences. Her Masters thesis, supervised by Gerald Meehl (National Center for Atmospheric Research) and Andrew Moore (University of Colorado) was titled "Interdecadal modulation of Australian climate in the Parallel Climate Model".

From 2007 to 2013 Arblaster completed her PhD at the School of Earth Sciences, University of Melbourne, Australia. Her PhD supervisors were David Karoly, Ian Simmonds (University of Melbourne) and Gerald Meehl. Her thesis topic was "Drivers of Southern Hemisphere Climate Change".

== Career ==
From 1999 to 2003, Professor Julie Arblaster worked as an associate scientist at the National Center for Atmospheric Research (NCAR). In 2003 she returned to Australia, working with NCAR and the Bureau of Meteorology in Melbourne. Professor Arblaster worked as a senior research scientist from 2003 to 2016 in the climate change processes team at The Centre for Australian Weather and Climate Research, which is a partnership between the Commonwealth Scientific and Industrial Research Organisation and the Bureau of Meteorology. She still maintains her research collaborations with the climate change prediction group at the NCAR. In 2016, Professor Arblaster joined the School of Earth, Atmosphere and Environment at Monash University in Melbourne, Australia. She was promoted to full Professor in July 2020.

== Research interests ==
Arblaster developed an interest in meteorology during the first year of her science degree, and subsequently switched the focus of her degree to study Atmospheric Science. During her time as a student she completed a summer internship at the Bureau of Meteorology, which inspired her to learn more about the climate system.

Arblaster's research focuses on the global climate system and mechanisms of past, recent and future climate change. In 2009, she coauthored a paper connecting small changes in the sun's activity during the 11-year solar cycle to mechanisms in the stratosphere and the oceans. Modelling more than a century of data, the researchers were able to predict regional weather patterns such as the Indian monsoon and winter rainfall in North America. The results also showed that global warning could not be adequately explained by the solar cycle. Identifying and isolating the impact of small stratospheric changes was an important step in developing accurate predictive models.

Arblaster uses climate models to understand shifts in the Southern Hemisphere atmospheric circulation such as the Southern Annular Mode (SAM) and the Indian Ocean Dipole (IOD), linking tropical variability and climate extremes. Arblaster is interested in the interplay between the predicted recovery of the Antarctic ozone hole over coming decades and greenhouse gas increases in future climate projections. She is developing models that can demonstrate the likelihood of extreme weather events and the contribution of human-caused climate change to such events.

Arblaster was a contributing author to the Working Group I contribution to the Fourth Assessment Report of the Intergovernmental Panel on Climate Change, 2007, and a lead author on Chapter 12, Long-term Climate Change: Projections, Commitments and Irreversibility, of the Working Group I Contribution to the Fifth Assessment Report of the IPCC. This chapter reviewed the available evidence to understand how the world's climate might have changed by the middle of this century and beyond. Notably, this IPCC report was the first to outline how much additional carbon dioxide can be emitted to keep global temperatures below specific thresholds.

Arblaster is a member of the World Climate Research Programme Stratospheric-Tropospheric Processes and their Role in Climate (SPARC) scientific steering group. She was a lead author on Scientific Assessment of Ozone Depletion: 2014 from the World Meteorological Organization and others.

Some of the most recent climate models suggest that the impact on "climate sensitivity" may be worse than previously anticipated. Arblaster is a signatory to a 2020 statement from 423 Australian scientists who have affirmed that "Scientific evidence unequivocally links human-caused climate change to the increasing risk of frequent and severe bushfires in the Australian landscape" and called on the Australian government "to develop science-informed policies to combat human-caused climate change" and "reduce Australia's total greenhouse gas emissions".

== Honours ==
In 2014 Arblaster was awarded the Anton Hales Medal for research in earth sciences by the Australian Academy of Science. This award recognised Arblaster's research on the global climate system and its sensitivity to changes.

In 2017, Arblaster won the Priestley Medal from the Australian Meteorological and Oceanographic Society.

Arblaster was a contributing author to the reports of the IPCC for which the IPCC was a co-recipient of the 2007 Nobel Peace Prize.

== Professional memberships ==
- Australian Meteorological and Oceanographic Society
- American Meteorological Society
- American Geophysical Union (AGU)
- Earth Science Women's Network (ESWN)
- World Climate Research Programme - Stratospheric-Tropospheric Processes and their Role in Climate (SPARC)
- Women in Science Enquiry Network

== Selected publications ==
- Meehl, Gerald A.; Hu, Aixue; Castruccio, Frederic; England, Matthew H.; Bates, Susan C.; Danabasoglu, Gokhan; McGregor, Shayne; Arblaster, Julie M.; Xie, Shang-Ping; Rosenbloom, Nan (14 December 2020). "Atlantic and Pacific tropics connected by mutually interactive decadal-timescale processes". Nature Geoscience. 14: 36–42. doi:10.1038/s41561-020-00669-x. S2CID 229163507.
- World Meteorological Organization (WMO) (2014). Scientific Assessment of Ozone Depletion: 2014 (PDF). Geneva, Switzerland: World Meteorological Organization.
- Collins M, Knutti R, Arblaster J, Dufresne JL, Fichefet T, et al. 2013. "Long-term climate change: projections, commitments and irreversibility." In Climate Change 2013: The Physical Science Basis. Contribution of Working Group I to the Fifth Assessment Report of the Intergovernmental Panel on Climate Change, ed. TF Stocker, D Qin, GK Plattner, M Tignor, SK Allen, et al. pp. 1029–1136. Cambridge, UK: Cambridge Univ. Press.
- Arblaster, Julie M.; Meehl, Gerald A. (15 June 2006). "Contributions of External Forcings to Southern Annular Mode Trends". Journal of Climate. 19 (12): 2896–2905. Bibcode:2006JCli...19.2896A. doi:10.1175/JCLI3774.1.
