= Sellar =

Sellar is a surname, and may refer to:

- Alexander Craig Sellar (1835 – 1890), Scottish lawyer and Liberal politician
- David Sellar (1941 – 2019), Scottish solicitor and officer of arms
- Eleanor Mary Dennistoun Sellar (1829–1918), Scottish memoirist
- George Sellar (1850 – 1889), Scottish recipient of the Victoria Cross
- Irvine Sellar (1934 – 2017), British property developer
- James Sellar (disambiguation)
- JoAnne Sellar (born 1963), English-American film producer
- Kenneth Sellar (1906 – 1989), English sportsman
- Patrick Sellar (1780 – 1851), factor to Duke of Sutherland. Widely believed to have committed culpable homicide during an eviction.
- W. C. Sellar (1898 – 1951), Scottish humourist
- William Sellar (1866 – 1914), Scottish footballer
- William Young Sellar (1825 – 1890), Scottish classical scholar

== See also ==
- Sellars, a surname
- Seller (surname)
- Cellar (disambiguation), a storage area, or rooms below ground level
