= Sellors =

Sellors is a surname. Notable people with the surname include:

- Patrick Sellors (1934–2010), British ophthalmologist
- Thomas Sellors (1902–1987), British cardiothoracic surgeon

== See also ==
- Sellars, another surname
- Sellers, another surname
