= Richard Somerville =

American climate scientist (born 1941)

Richard C. J. Somerville
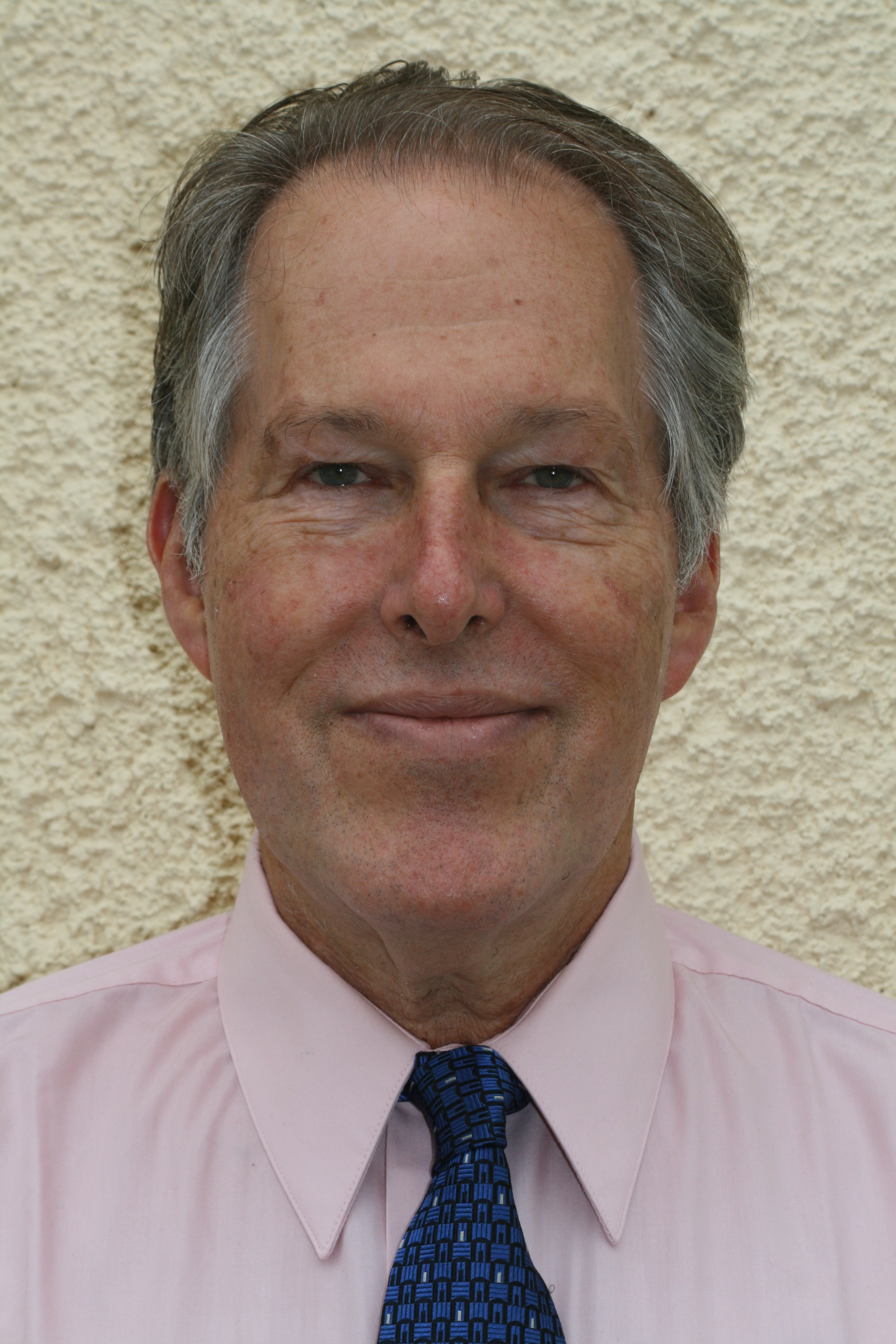
- Richard Somerville
- Education: New York University; Pennsylvania State University
- Scientific career
- Fields: Climate science
- Workplaces: University of California, San Diego

Richard Chapin James Somerville is an American climate scientist who is a Distinguished Professor Emeritus at Scripps Institution of Oceanography at the University of California, San Diego, where he has been a professor since 1979.

== Early life ==
He received a B. S. in meteorology from Pennsylvania State University in 1961 and a Ph.D. in meteorology from New York University in 1966.

== Academic career ==
Somerville is a theoretical meteorologist and an expert on computer simulations of the atmosphere. His research is on the physics of clouds and their role in the climate system. His interests include all aspects of climate, including climate science outreach and the interface between science and public policy. This research is reflected by a long list of publications in highly respected, peer reviewed journals. He comments frequently on climate and environmental issues for the media. He formally retired in 2007 but remains active in research, education and outreach. With Samuel S. P. Shen, he co-authored the book Climate Mathematics: Theory and Applications (Cambridge University Press, 2019).

== Honors ==
Somerville has been named a Fellow of three scientific societies: the American Association for the Advancement of Science, the American Geophysical Union, and the American Meteorological Society. In 2017, Somerville received the Ambassador Award of the American Geophysical Union. This award is given in recognition of “outstanding contributions to one or more of the following area(s): societal impact, service to the Earth and space community, scientific leadership, and promotion of talent/career pool.” Among his honors to date, Somerville has received awards from the American Meteorological Society for both his research and his popular book The Forgiving Air: Understanding Environmental Change, a new edition of which was published in 2008 (ISBN 9781878220851). He was a Coordinating Lead Author for the 2007 Intergovernmental Panel on Climate Change Fourth Assessment report (IPCC AR4). The American Geophysical Union awarded him its 2015 Climate Communication Prize, which "highlights the importance of promoting scientific literacy, clarity of message, and efforts to foster respect and understanding of science-based values as they relate to the implications of climate change."

== Advocacy and outreach ==
Somerville was an organizer and signatory of the 2007 Bali Declaration by Climate Scientists. Throughout 2009 he worked with an international team of 26 leading climate scientists to prepare the Copenhagen Diagnosis. The Copenhagen Diagnosis was released in the lead-up to the UNFCCC COP15 conference in Copenhagen. It synthesizes the most recent scientific findings from hundreds of peer reviewed papers in areas such as greenhouse gas emissions, sea level, glaciers, tipping points and extreme climate events, among other key topics. Interviews, lectures and popular writings can be found on his personal website. Richard Somerville wrote the chapter on Communicating Climate Change Science in the 2019 University of California online publication, Bending the Curve: Climate Change Solutions. In 2022, Richard Somerville received the Haagen-Smit Clean Air Award for 2020-2021 from the California Air Resources Board, for a “lifetime of important contributions and achievements” in the field of climate change science.
