= Bruce Morton (mathematician) =

Australian/New Zealand applied mathematician

Bruce Rutherfurd Morton
- Born: 11 April 1926
- Died: 15 September 2012 (aged 86)
- Scientific career
- Workplaces: Cambridge University, University College London, University of Manchester, Monash University.

Bruce Morton (11 April 1926 – 15 September 2012) was an Australian/New Zealand applied mathematician.

== Early life and education ==
Morton was born in Wellington, New Zealand and educated at Auckland Grammar School. He gained a government scholarship to attend the University of Auckland, where he completed a double degree in mathematics and physics. Whilst at the University of Auckland he was an active member of the mountaineering club and climbed with Edmund Hillary. In 1949, Morton was awarded the Rutherford fellowship to study for a BA mathematical tripos at St John's College, Cambridge.

== Cambridge ==
In 1956 he completed his PhD in the Department of Applied Mathematics and Theoretical Physics (DAMPT) at Cambridge University under the supervision of Sir G.I. Taylor and Sir George Batchelor. His thesis work was published in paper that became a classic of the fluid dynamics literature - the much cited Morton, Taylor and Turner result. The study developed an explanation for a source of buoyancy being injected into a stratified fluid. By conserving volume, momentum and buoyancy, the study predicted the final height to which a plume of light fluid will rise in a stably stratified fluid. These predictions where then compared with laboratory experiments created using a stratified salt solution.

Fellow student and co-author on the plume paper Stewart Turner recalled that Batchelor suggested that he conduct some laboratory experiments to test Morton's theory of the rise of plumes and “buoyant clouds” in stratified surroundings. The starting point was an entrainment hypothesis proposed by Taylor which assumes that the rising turbulent motion in the plume causes an inflow of environmental fluid at a rate that is proportional to the average upward velocity. When Morton and Turner wrote the manuscript documenting the agreement between theory and experiment they discovered that Taylor was also preparing a “much delayed note” on the subject. Taylor included an explanation at the end of the Morton paper explaining the circumstances. He did add some distinctive touches to the article including estimates of the height of rise of smoke from an autumn bonfire (150 ft) and a burning town (3200 m) with specified burning rates and atmospheric conditions; and as noted by Turner - the mixed units are Taylor's.

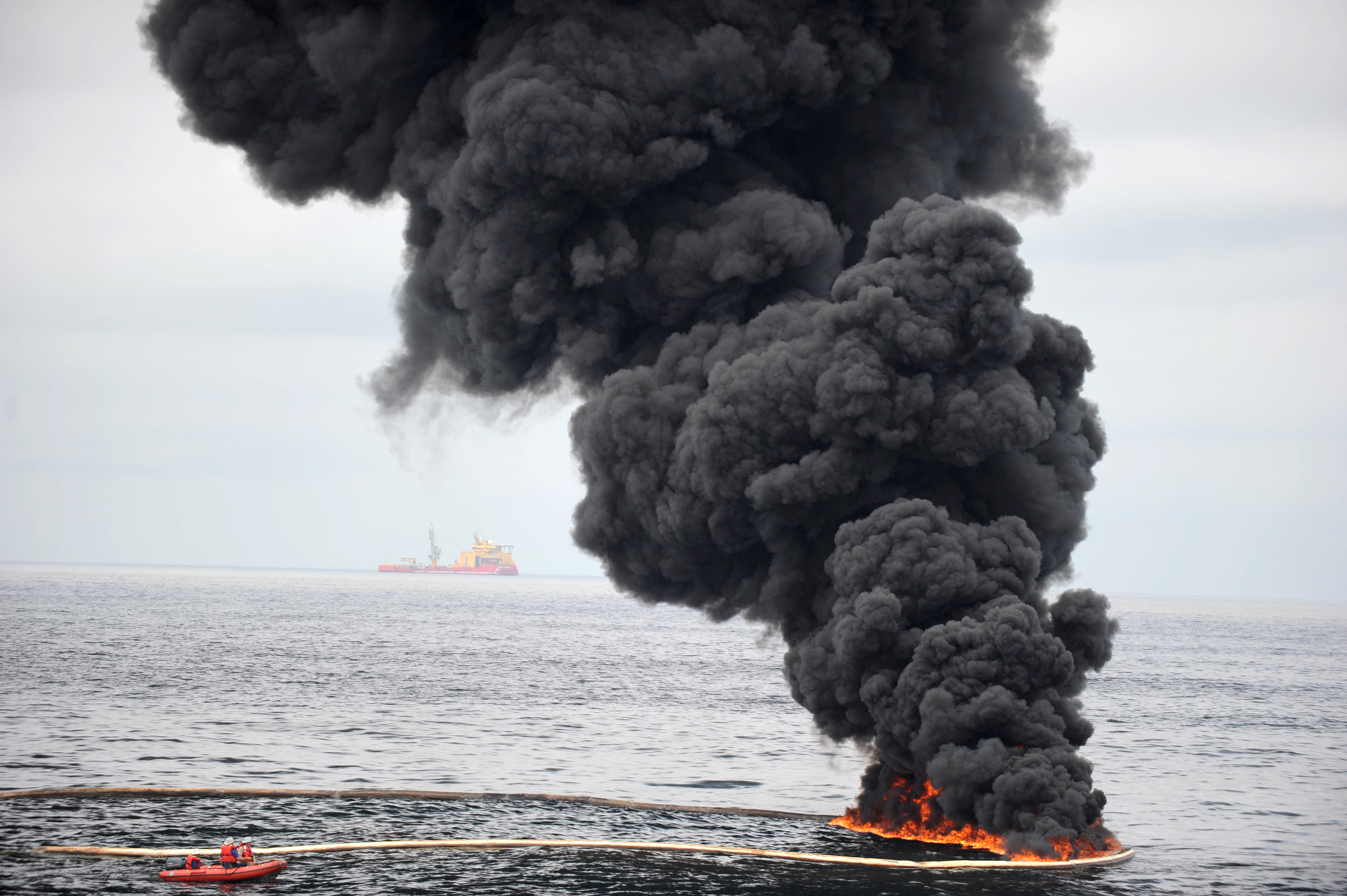
An example of a plume - in this case smoke from controlled oil fire in Gulf of Mexico, Louisiana, after Deepwater Horizon Oil Spill, May 5, 2010.

== University of Manchester ==
After his Ph.D. Morton briefly took up an academic appointment at University College London. However, he was soon offered a position at the University of Manchester by James Lighthill where he worked until 1967. During this time he developed an interest in the propagation of bush fires.

== Monash University ==
In 1967, Morton was appointed to a chair in applied mathematics at Monash University, Melbourne, Australia. There he established a leading research group in geophysical fluid dynamics within the department of mathematics. As well as his influential work on plumes he emphasized the importance of vorticity in the behaviour of fluids. In lectures he would often state ‘vorticity is the flow field’. He retired as chair in 1991.

After his death in 2012 a special issue of the journal Australian Meteorological and Oceanographic Journal (which changed its name to Journal of Southern Hemisphere Earth Systems Science in 2016) dedicated to Morton's work and impact was published in 2014. It contained a series of invited review papers by prominent research scientists from around the world who interacted with Morton on the many topics he was involved in throughout his career. As well as plumes, he worked on tropical cyclone formation, as recognised in the special issue.

== AMOS and the Morton Medal ==
Morton contributed to the running and organisation of the Australian Meteorological and Oceanographic Society, especially in the fostering of participation from all parts of Australia. In 2000 the Society renamed its AMOS Medal after him and commenced awarding the Morton Medal as a "biennial award recognising leadership in meteorology and/or oceanography and/or related fields, with particular emphasis on education and development of young scientists, and personal example in research". Winners of the medal include Matthias Tomczak, Gary Meyers, Andy Pitman, Ann Henderson-Sellers, David Karoly, John Church, and Matthew England.

== Personal life ==
In 1953 Morton married Alison Gladding, who he had met in the University of Auckland mountaineering club, at the Marylebone Presbyterian Church near Marble Arch in London. They had three daughters - Clare, Janne and Anna.

== Awards ==
- 1949 - Rutherford Fellowship for study at St John's College, University of Cambridge.
