= The Cellar =

The Cellar may refer to:

- The Cellar (novel), a 1980 horror novel by Richard Laymon
- The Cellar (Macy's), a brand name used by Macy's
- The Cellar (Enfield, North Carolina), a home on the US National Register of Historic Places
- The Cellar (teen dance club), a 1964-1970 music venue in Arlington Heights, Illinois, US
- The Cellar (1989 film), a horror film directed by Kevin S. Tenney
- The Cellar, a 2015 novel by Minette Walters
- 10 Cloverfield Lane, a 2016 thriller film directed by Dan Trachtenburg, previously known as The Cellar
- The Cellar (2022 film), a supernatural horror film

== See also ==
- Cellar (disambiguation)
