= Matthew England =

Australian climatologist

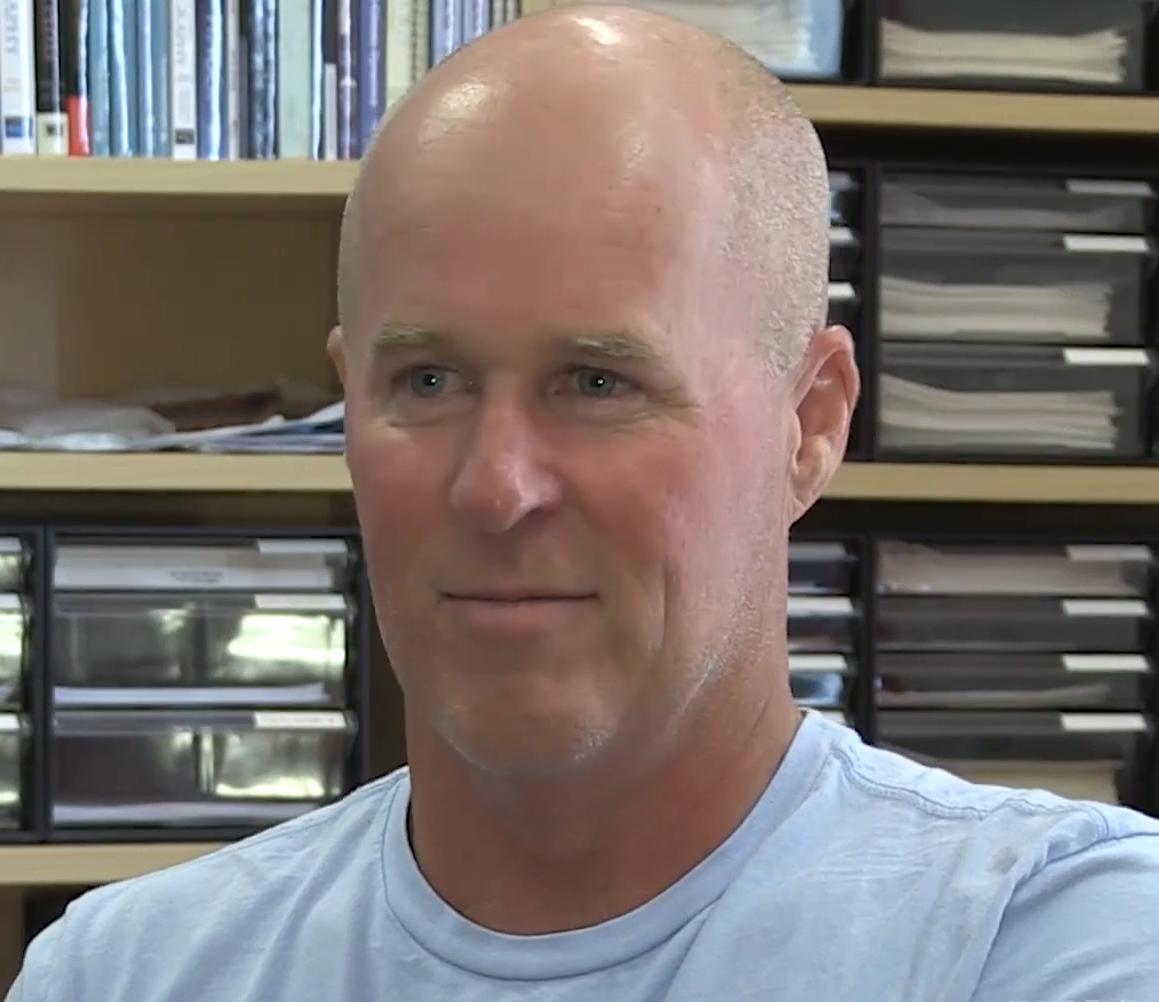
- Matthew England
- Occupations: physical oceanographer climate scientist
- Years active: 1990s–

Matthew England is an Australian physical oceanographer and climate scientist. As of 2023 he is Scientia Professor of Oceanography at the Centre for Marine Science & Innovation at the University of New South Wales, Sydney. In 2026 he became Director of the ARC Centre of Excellence for Our Future Oceans.

== Early life and education ==
Matthew England completed a B.Sc. (Honours Class I and University Medal) at the University of Sydney in 1987, followed by a PhD in 1992, holding a Fulbright Scholarship at Princeton University in 1990.

== Research and career ==
After completing his PhD England took up a postdoctoral research fellowship at the Centre National de la Recherche Scientifique, in Toulouse, France, from 1992-1994. He then returned to Australia to take up a research scientist position at CSIRO Oceans and Atmosphere, before moving to the University of New South Wales. In 2005 he was awarded an Australian Research Council Federation Fellowship followed by an ARC Laureate Fellowship in 2010.

England established the Climate Change Research Centre at the University of New South Wales with Andrew Pitman in 2007.

England was an organiser and signatory of the 2007 Bali Declaration by Climate Scientists, and the convening lead author of the Copenhagen Diagnosis in 2009, chairing its release in Copenhagen at the UNFCCC COP15 meeting.

England's work relates to the global ocean circulation and its influence on the atmosphere, ice, and climate, with a particular focus on ocean-atmosphere processes in the tropics, the circulation in both the ocean and atmosphere in the Southern Hemisphere mid-latitudes, and coupled ocean-ice-atmosphere feed-backs around Antarctica.

== Honours and awards ==
England was elected a Fellow of the Australian Academy of Science in 2014. He is also a fellow of the Royal Society of New South Wales (2015), and a fellow of the American Geophysical Union (2016).

His other awards include:

- Jaeger Medal (2023) awarded by the Australian Academy of Science
- ISI Web of Science Highly Cited Researcher (2019, 2020, 2021, 2022)
- James Cook Medal (2019) awarded by the Royal Society of New South Wales
- Tinker-Muse Prize for Science and Policy in Antarctica (2017) awarded by the Tinker-Muse foundation
- Sydney Institute of Marine Science Emerald Award (2017)
- UK Diamond Jubilee Visiting Fellow (2016)
- New South Wales Premier's Prize for Excellence in Mathematics, Earth Sciences, Chemistry and Physics, 2012
- Australian Laureate Fellowship, 2010, awarded by the Australian Research Council
- Future Justice Prize (2010)
- Australian Museum Eureka Prize for Water Research (2008)
- Banksia Foundation Australian Environmental Researcher of the Year Award (2008)
- Royal Society of Victoria Research Medal (2007)
- Australian Museum Eureka Prize for Environmental Research (2006)
- Federation Fellowship (2005) awarded by the Australian Research Council (2005)
- Priestley Medal (2005), awarded by the Australian Meteorological and Oceanographic Society
- Flagship Fellow, 2005, awarded by CSIRO
- Frederick White Prize, 2004 awarded by the Australian Academy of Science
- RH Clarke Lecture, 2004, awarded by the Australian Meteorological and Oceanographic Society
- QEII Fellowship, 1998, awarded by the Australian Research Council
- Fulbright Scholarship (1990) Princeton University
- University Medal, 1987, awarded by The University of Sydney
