= Natalie Jones =

Natalie Jones may refer to:

- Natalie Jones (swimmer)
- Natalie Jones (diplomat)
- Natalie Jones (politician)
