= 2007 United Nations Climate Change Conference =

International conference held in Indonesia

United Nations Climate Change Conference COP13
- Date: 3 December 2007–15 December 2007
- Locations: Bali International Conference Centre, Nusa Dua, Bali, Indonesia
- Previous event: ← Nairobi 2006
- Next event: Poznań 2008 →
- Participants: UNFCCC member countries

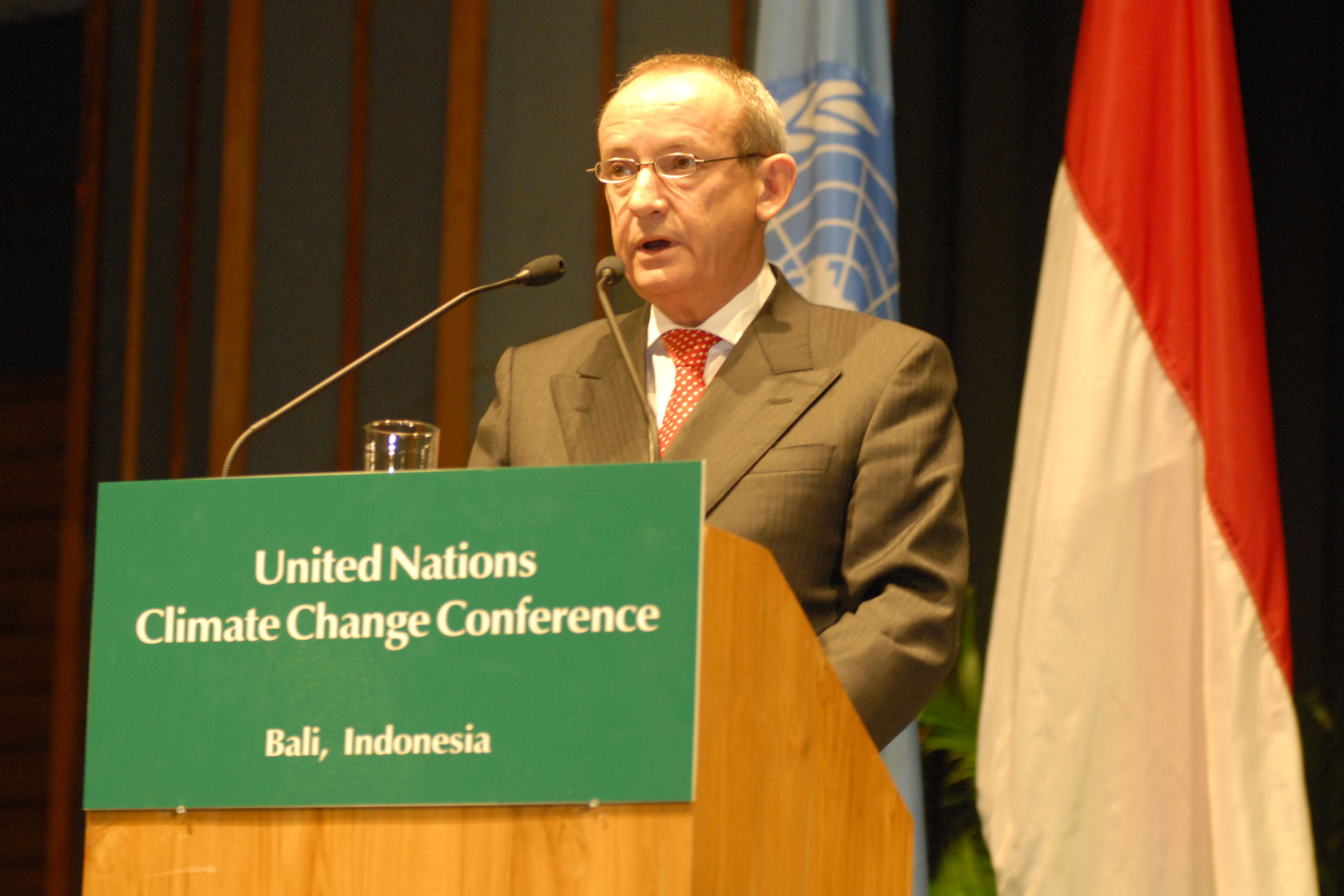
UNFCCC Executive Secretary Yvo de Boer opens the conference on 3 December 2007

The 2007 United Nations Climate Change Conference took place at the Bali International Conference Centre, Nusa Dua, Bali, Indonesia, from 3 to 15 December 2007. Representatives from over 180 countries attended, along with observers from intergovernmental and non-governmental organizations. The conference encompassed meetings of several bodies, including the 13th Conference of the Parties to the United Nations Framework Convention on Climate Change (COP 13) and the 3rd Meeting of the Parties to the Kyoto Protocol (MOP 3 or CMP 3), together with other subsidiary bodies and a ministerial meeting.

Negotiations on a successor to the Kyoto Protocol dominated the conference. A meeting of environment ministers and experts held in June had called for the conference to agree on a roadmap, timetable, and "concrete steps for the negotiations" with the aim of reaching an agreement by 2009.

Initial EU proposals called for global emissions to peak within 10 to 15 years and decline to "well below half" of 2000 levels by 2050, with developed countries reducing emissions 20–40% below 1990 levels by 2020. The United States strongly opposed these targets, at times backed by Japan, Canada, Australia, and Russia. The resulting compromise mandated "deep cuts in global emissions" with references to the IPCC's Fourth Assessment Report.

== See also ==
- Bali Communiqué – statement from 150 global business leaders
- Bali Road Map
- Post–Kyoto Protocol negotiations on greenhouse gas emissions
- Bali Declaration by Climate Scientists
