= Plume (fluid dynamics) =

Column of one fluid moving through another

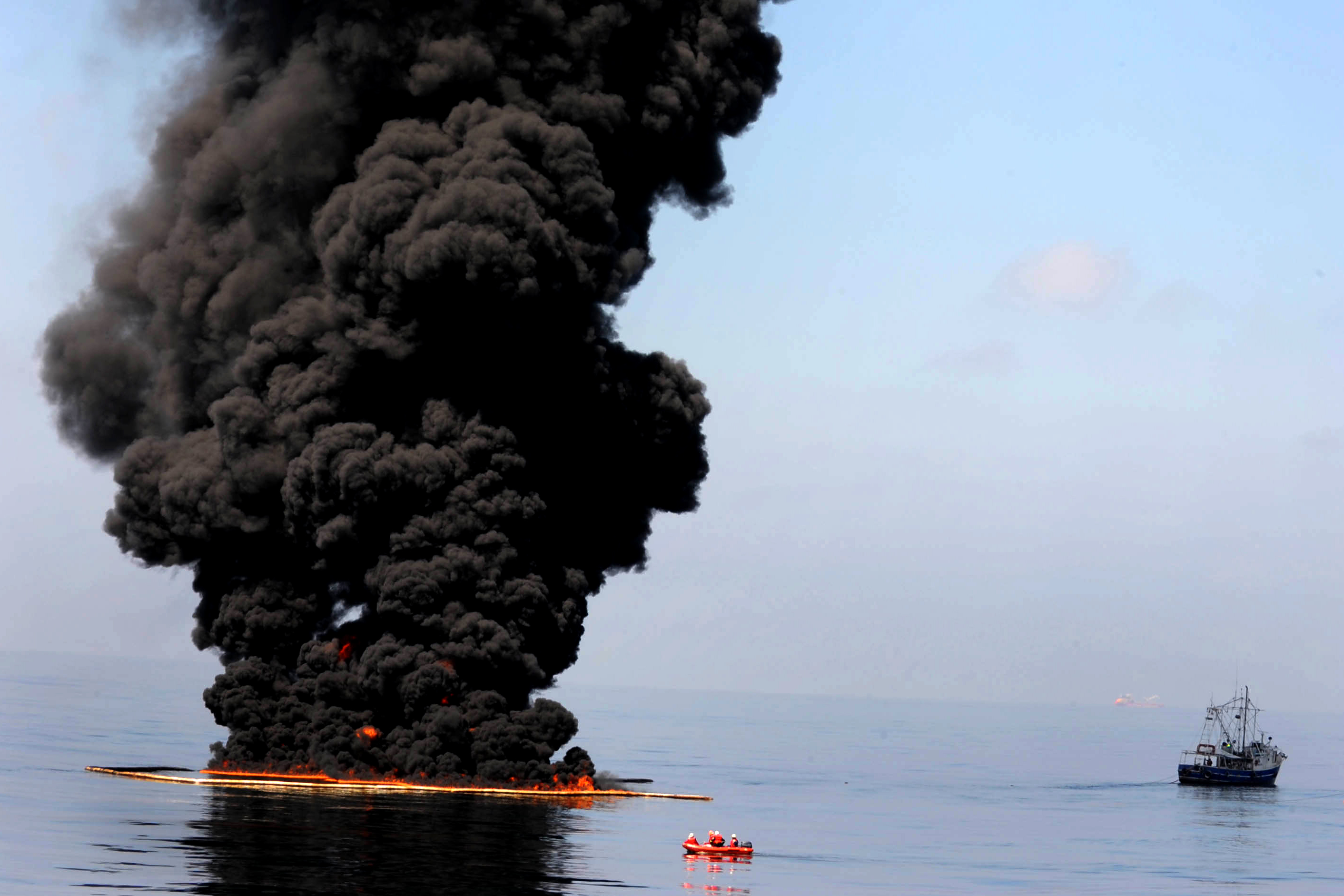
A controlled burn of oil creating a smoke plume

In hydrodynamics, a plume or a column is a vertical body of one fluid moving through another. Several effects control the motion of the fluid, including momentum (inertia), diffusion (temperature, viscosity, surface tension), and buoyancy (differences in mass density).

Jets and plumes deemed "pure" represent flows that are driven entirely by momentum and buoyancy, respectively. Flows occurring between these limiting cases are usually characterized as buoyant jets and forced plumes.

A plume is said to be positively buoyant when, in the absence of additional external forces or initial conditions, the column of fluid tends to rise. By contrast, a plume is said to be negatively buoyant when the density of the column is greater than its surroundings (statically, its natural tendency would be to sink), but the flow has sufficient initial momentum to exhibit a rise.

== Movement ==
As a plume moves away from its source, it usually widens because of entrainment of the surrounding fluid at its edges. Plume shapes can be influenced by flow in the ambient fluid. (Take, for example, the case of a local wind blowing in the same direction as the plume, resulting in a co-flowing jet.) This can cause a plume which was initially buoyancy-dominated to become momentum-dominated, a transition usually predicted by the dimensionless Richardson number.

=== Flow and detection ===
Another phenomenon of importance is whether a plume exhibits laminar flow or turbulent flow. Usually, there is a transition from laminar to turbulent flow as the plume moves away from its source. This behavior, for example, can be clearly seen in the rising column of smoke from a cigarette. Here, the leading-edge of the flow, or the starting-plume, is often approximately the shape of a ring-vortex or smoke ring.

When substantial accuracy is required, computational fluid dynamics (CFD) can be employed to simulate plumes, but the results can be sensitive to the turbulence model chosen. CFD is often used for rocket plumes, where condensed-phase constituents can be present in addition to gaseous constituents. These types of simulations can become quite complex if effects such as afterburning and thermal radiation are included. As a practical example, ballistic missile launches are often detected by sensing hot rocket plumes.

Spacecraft designers are sometimes concerned with the impingement of attitude control system thruster plumes onto sensitive subsystems such as solar arrays and star trackers. An additional area of concern is the effect of rocket engine plumes onto moon or planetary surfaces, where local damage or even mid-term disturbances to planetary atmospheres can result.

== Types ==
A thermal plume occurs when a column of heated gas propagates upward above a thermal source. The plume rises because thermal expansion causes the heated gas to become less dense than the surrounding cooler gas.

Pollutants released to the ground can propagate into groundwater sources, leading to groundwater pollution. The resulting body of polluted water within an aquifer is characterized as a plume, with its migrating edges called plume fronts. These plumes are used to locate, map, and measure water pollution within the aquifer's total body of water. Additionally, plume fronts are used to determine the direction and speed of a given contaminate's spread.

Plumes are of considerable importance in the atmospheric dispersion modelling of air pollution. Gary Briggs has authored a classic work on the subject of air pollution plumes.

== Simple plume modeling ==
Simple modeling can enable many properties of fully developed, turbulent plumes to be investigated. Many of the classic scaling arguments were developed in a combined analytic and laboratory study described in an influential paper by Bruce Morton, G. I. Taylor, and Stewart Turner. This and subsequent work is described in the popular monograph of Stewart Turner:

1. It is usually sufficient to assume that the pressure gradient is set by that which is far from the plume (this approximation is similar to the usual Boussinesq approximation).
2. The distribution of density and velocity across the plume are modeled either with simple Gaussian distributions or else are taken as uniform across the plume (the so-called top hat model).
3. The rate of entrainment into the plume is proportional to the local velocity. Though initially thought to be a constant, recent work has shown that the entrainment coefficient varies with the local Richardson number. Typical values for the entrainment coefficient are about 0.08 for vertical jets and 0.12 for vertical, buoyant plumes, while for bent-over plumes the entrainment coefficient is about 0.6.
4. Conservation equations for mass (including entrainment), and momentum and buoyancy fluxes are sufficient for a complete description of the flow in many cases. For a simple rising plume these equations predict that the plume will widen at a constant half-angle of about 6 to 15 degrees.

The value of the entrainment coefficient is the key parameter in simple plume models. Research continues into assessing how the entrainment coefficient is affected by, for example, the geometry of a plume, suspended particles within a plume, and background rotation.

== Gaussian plume modeling ==
Gaussian plume models can be used in several fluid dynamics scenarios to calculate the concentration distribution of solutes, such as the release by a smoke stack or a contaminant released into a river. Gaussian distributions are established by Fickian diffusion, and follow a Gaussian, or bell-shaped, distribution. For calculating the expected concentration $C$ of a point source, we consider a mass $M$ released at an instantaneous point in time $t$ in a one-dimensional domain along $x$. This results in the distribution
$$C(x,t) = \frac{M}{\sqrt{4 \pi D t}} \exp \left( \frac{(x - x_0)^2}{4D (t - t_0)} \right),$$
where $M$ is the mass released at time $t = t_0$ and location $x = x_0$, and $D$ is the diffusivity in units of meters^{2}/second. This model makes the following four assumptions:

1. The mass $M$ is released instantaneously at time $t$.
2. The one-dimensional domain $x$ is unbounded, or infinite.
3. Mass is spread only through the mechanism of diffusion.
4. Diffusion, quantified with diffusivity $D$, is constant, or does not vary as a function of $x$.

== Gallery ==
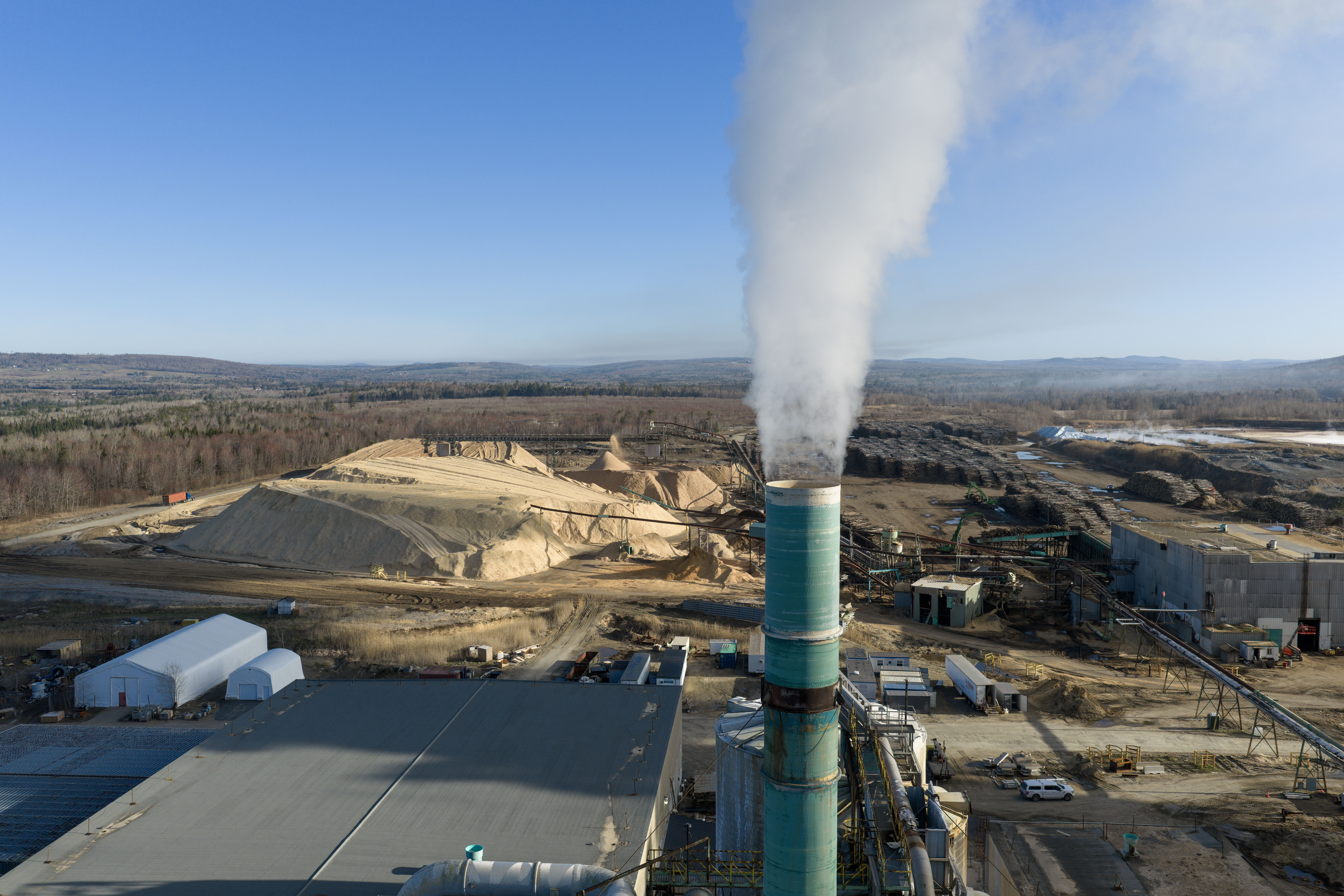
Steam plumes from industrial sources.

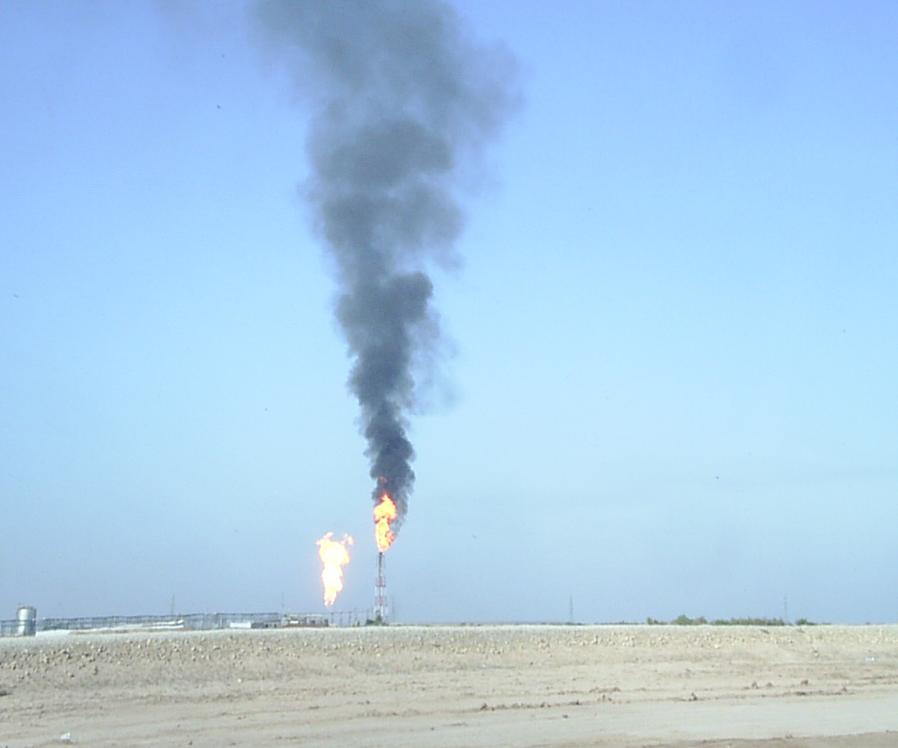
A large natural convection plume.

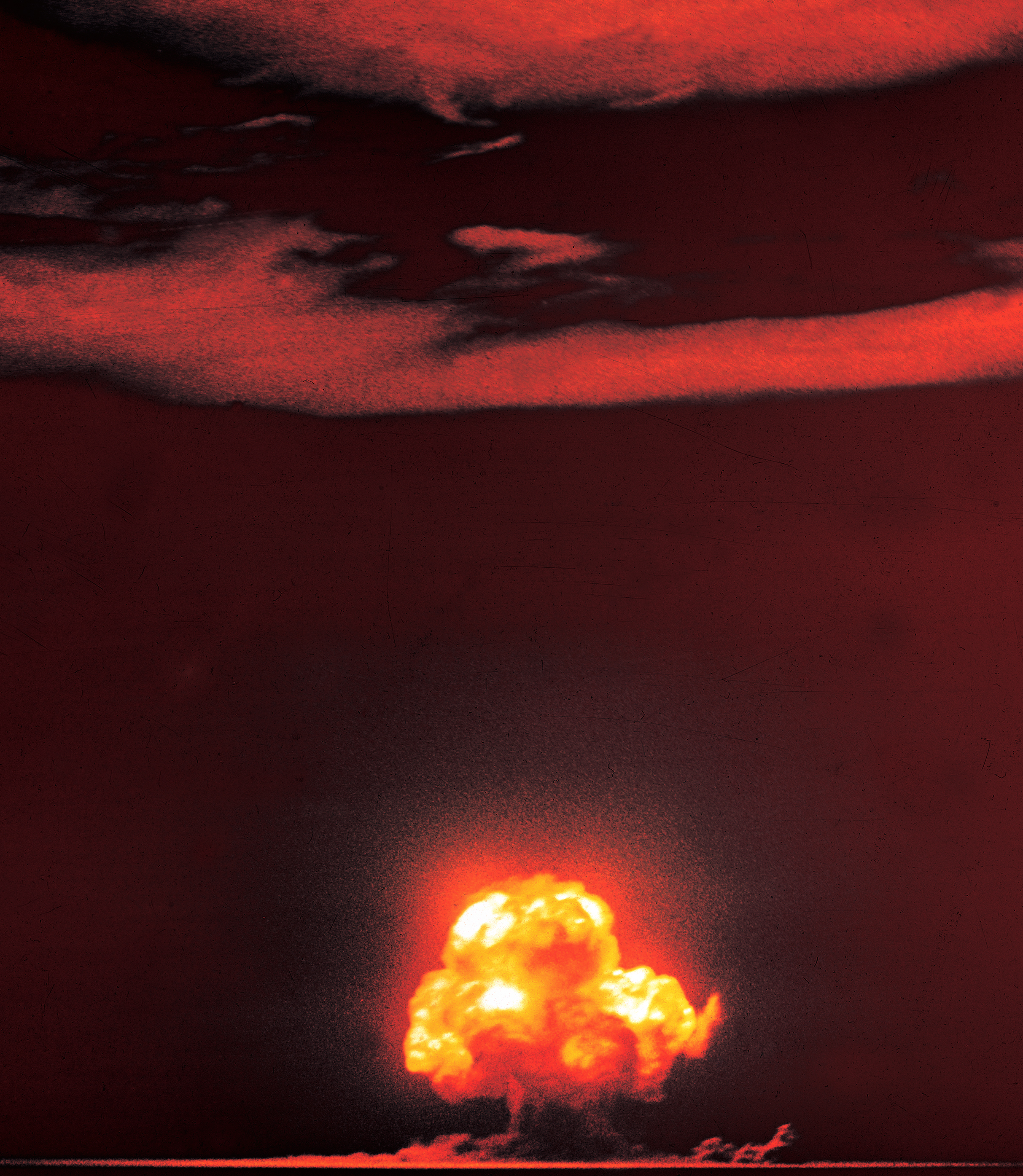
A nuclear explosion can generate a mushroom-shaped thermal plume.

== See also ==
- Atmospheric dispersion modeling
  - Bibliography of atmospheric dispersion modeling
  - Outline of air pollution dispersion
- Cryovolcano
- Enceladus, moon of Saturn
- Eruption column, a plume of volcanic gas and ash in the atmosphere
- Mantle plume, an upwelling of molten rock within the Earth's mantle
- Moisture plume or atmospheric river, a narrow corridor of concentrated moist air
- Toilet plume
