= Andrew Pitman =

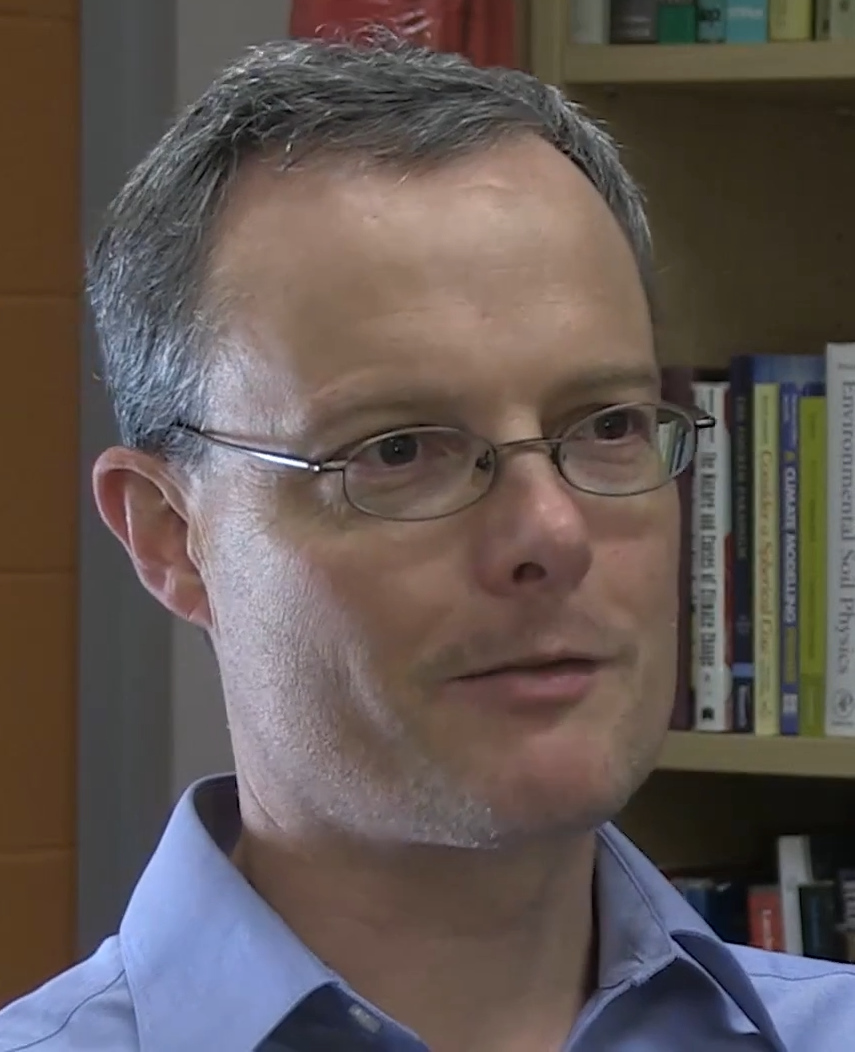
Andrew Pitman in 2015

Andrew John Pitman AO FAA is a British-Australian atmospheric scientist.

He was born in Bristol in 1964 and educated at Liverpool University (B.Sc. Hons and Ph.D.). He holds a Postgraduate Certificate in Educational Leadership (Higher Education) from Macquarie University.

In 2002 Pitman became a professor at Macquarie University, Sydney, Australia, moving to University of New South Wales in 2007. He is currently the Director of the Australian Research Council's Centre of Excellence for Climate Extremes. Prior to this, Pitman was the Director of the Australian Research Council's Centre of Excellence for Climate System Science (2011 - 2017). He won the Australian Meteorological and Oceanographical Society's Priestly Medal for excellence in Atmospheric Science Research in 2004 and the Australian Meteorological and Oceanographical Medal in 2009. He contributed to the Copenhagen Diagnosis which was shortlisted for a 2010 Eureka Prize and won the 2010 Future Justice Prize. He was shortlisted for the 2017 and 2018 Eureka Prizes for Science leadership. He won the New South Wales' NSW Climate Scientist of the year in 2010. In January 2019 Pitman was made an Officer of the Order of Australia (AO) "for distinguished service to science as a leading researcher, particularly of climate systems and the environment". In December 2019 Pitman was awarded the Royal Society of Victoria's Medal for Excellence in Scientific Research. He was elected a Fellow of the Australian Academy of Science in May 2021.

== Research interests ==
Pitman has a long history of working on land surface processes for climate models. He has worked on improving how hydrology, vegetation and land cover change is represented in climate models, and the global and regional impacts of land cover change. He has interests in climate extremes and how these are likely to change in the future.

== Positions held ==
Pitman currently holds the following positions:

- Non-executive director, Risk Frontiers
- Editor, Environmental Research: Climate
- Director of the Australian Research Council's Centre of Excellence for Climate Extremes, hosted by the University of New South Wales
- Director of the Australian Research Council's Centre of Excellence for Climate System Science, hosted by the University of New South Wales (contributory to the setting up of the Climate Change Research Centre).
- Former Convenor of the Australian Research Council Research Network for Earth System Science
- Former Editor of the Journal of Climate
- Former Chair of the World Climate Research Programme’s committee on Global Land Atmospheric System Study
- Chair of the Australian Academy of Science's national committee on Earth Systems Science
- Member of the advisory board of the Risk Frontiers Natural Hazards Research Centre.

Pitman also served as a lead author of Working Group 1 of the IPCC 2005 and 2007 and was a Review Editor in the last assessment.

== Selected publications ==
A full list is available at:http://www.researcherid.com/rid/A-7353-2011

or ORCID: http://orcid.org/0000-0003-0604-3274
