= Donald Firesmith =

American engineer

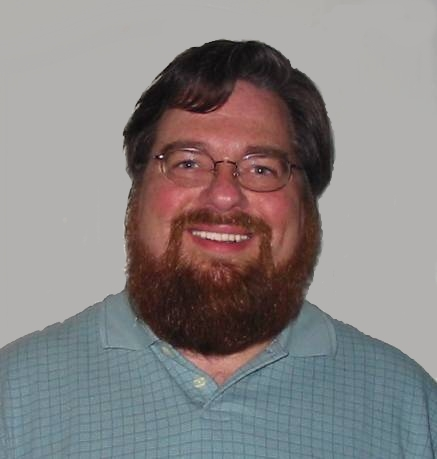
- Donald Firesmith in 2006
- Born: June 14, 1952 (age 74); Oklahoma City, Oklahoma
- Citizenship: United States
- Education: Arizona State University
- Known for: Method Framework for Engineering System Architectures, Method engineering
- Scientific career
- Fields: System engineering, software engineering, Requirements engineering, method engineering, and object-oriented design
- Workplaces: Software Engineering Institute

Donald G. Firesmith (born June 14, 1952) is an American software engineer, consultant, and trainer at the Software Engineering Institute.

== Biography ==
Firesmith received his B.A. in Mathematics and German from Linfield College in 1975 and his M.A. in Mathematics from Arizona State University in 1977. He also studied one year at LMU Munich.

Firesmith started working in the computer business as a software developer in 1979 and has been quality engineer, configuration manager, and data manager for Computer Science Corporation in the US, Germany, and Switzerland. From 1984 to 1988 he was an OO methodologist at Magnavox Electronic Systems Corporation. And from 1988 to 1995 he was President of Advanced Software Technology Specialists, a small consulting and training company.

From 1994 to 1997 he has been an acquisition editor and editor and chief of Reference Books at SIGS Books. And further he was a Senior advisory software engineer at StorageTek, where he worked as a technical leader, requirements engineer, and software architect, Chief architect Lante Corporation, which specialized in producing eMarketplaces, and Chief architect for the North American Business Unit of Cambridge Technology Partners. From 2003 through 2020, he was a Principal Engineer at the Software Engineering Institute where he works in the Client Technical Solutions Software Solutions Division helping the United States Government acquire software-intensive systems. Since retiring in 2020, he has been a full-time novelist.

Firesmith was named an ACM Distinguished Member in 2015.

== Work ==
=== Method Engineering (ME) and Open Process Environment and Notation (OPEN) ===
Firesmith is a co-founder with Brian Henderson-Sellers and Ian Graham of the international OPEN Consortium. Firesmith was the principal developer of the OPEN Modeling Language. Firesmith is the founder of the OPEN Process Framework Repository Organization and the developer of its large repository of free, open-source, reusable method components.

The OPEN approach to software development is founded on situational method engineering (SME). This is a means by which a software development team can construct a method and process that is appropriate for their own particular situation or circumstances. Fragments of methods, conformant with an international software engineering metamodel standard such as ISO/IEC 24744 and stored in a repository, are individually selected and the method composed from these method fragments. The SME approach is based on research by many groups worldwide – results from a recent conference are published.

=== Method Framework for Engineering System Architectures (MFESA) ===
Firesmith is the primary developer of the Method Framework for Engineering System Architectures (MFESA). This framework consists of the following:

- Ontology defining the key concepts of system architecture engineering and their relationships
- Metamodel defining the foundational abstract supertypes of method components for engineering system architectures including architectural:
  - Work products including architectures and architectural representations such as models and documents
  - Work units including activities, tasks, and techniques for producing the work products
  - Producers including architects, architecture teams, and architecture tools that perform the work units to produce the work products
- Repository of free, open-source, reusable method components for creating situation-specific system architecture engineering methods
- Metamethod for creating situation-specific system architecture engineering methods by selecting appropriate method components from the repository, tailoring them as appropriate, and integrating them to form the new architecture engineering method

== Publications ==
He is the author of several technical books in system and software engineering as well as numerous technical articles, conference papers, and tutorials A selection:

- 1993. Object-Oriented Requirements Analysis and Logical Design: A Software Engineering Approach, John Wiley & Sons, ISBN 0-471-57807-X
- 1995. The Dictionary of Object Technology: The Definitive Desk Reference, Cambridge University Books, ISBN 0-13-373887-6, with Edward M. Eykholt
- 1998. OPEN Modeling Language (OML) Reference Manual, Cambridge University Books, ISBN 1-884842-75-5, with Brian Henderson-Sellers and Ian Graham
- 1998. Documenting a Complete Java Application using OPEN, Addison-Wesley Longman, ISBN 0-201-34277-4, with Scott Krutsch, Marshall Stowe, and Greg Hendley
- 2001. The OPEN Process Framework, Addison-Wesley Longman, ISBN 0-201-67510-2, with Brian Henderson-Sellers
- 2008. The Method Framework for Engineering System Architectures, Auerbach Publication, ISBN 978-1-4200-8575-4, with Peter Capell, Dietrich Falkenthal, Charles B. Hammons, DeWitt T. Latimer IV, and Tom Merendino
- 2013. Common System and Software Testing Pitfalls and Ways to Prevent and Mitigate Them: Descriptions, Symptoms, Consequences, Causes, and Recommendations, Addison-Wesley, ISBN 978-0133748550
- 2019. The Simulation Theory of Consciousness: (or Your Autonomous Car is Sentient), KDP, ISBN 978-1705622919

Firesmith is also the author of several modern paranormal fantasy, apocalyptic science fiction, action and adventure novels:

- 2014. Magical Wands: A Cornucopia of Wand Lore, CreateSpace, ISBN 978-1497311220 (under the pen name Wolfrick Ignatius Feuerschmied)
- 2015. Hell Holes: What Lurks Below, CreateSpace, ISBN 978-1515068075
- 2016. Hell Holes: Demons on the Dalton, CreateSpace, ISBN 978-1523241767
- 2018. The Secrets of Hawthorne House, CreateSpace, ISBN 978-1497311220
- 2020. Hell Holes: To Hell and Back, KDP, ISBN 978-1087921051
- 2021. A Cauldron of Uncanny Dreams, KDP, ISBN 979-8566545042
- 2021. Hell Holes: A Slave's Revenge, KDP, ISBN 979-8527374209
