= Waldron Phoenix Belknap Jr. =

American art historian and architect (1889–1949)0

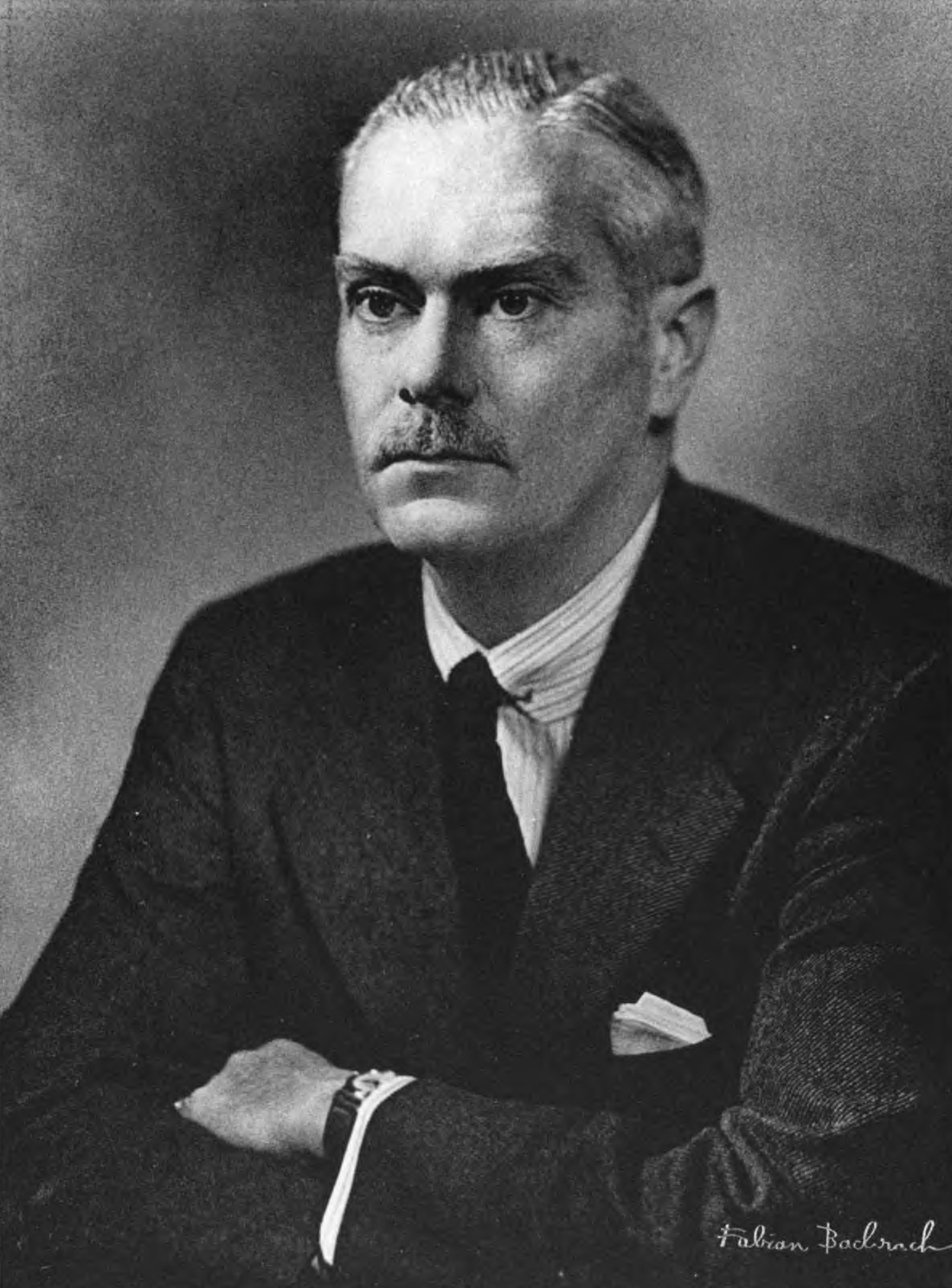
- Born: May 12, 1899; New York City, New York, US
- Died: December 14, 1949 (aged 50); Boston, Massachusetts, US
- Education: Harvard College (BA), Harvard Graduate School of Design (MA)
- Occupations: Art historian; architect; soldier
- Known for: Colonial American art history

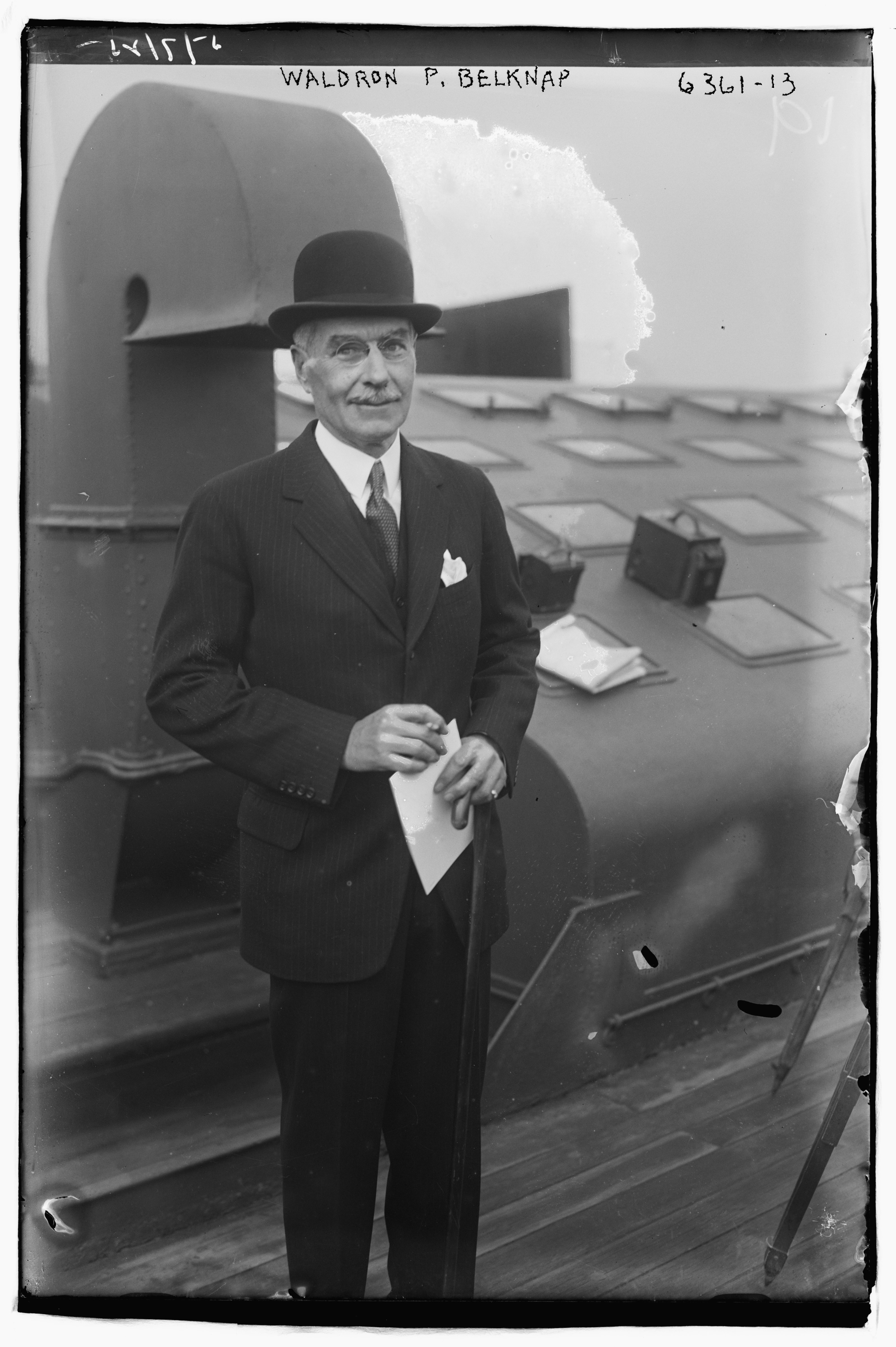
Belknap Sr. in 1900

Waldron Phoenix Belknap Jr. (May 12, 1899 – December 14, 1949) was an American art historian, architect, soldier, and expert in eighteenth-century American painting and portraiture. He received bachelor's and master's degrees from Harvard University and served in the U.S. Army during both world wars, rising to the rank of captain. Harvard University Press named its Belknap Press imprint in his honor in 1954, and the Winterthur Museum, Garden and Library holds the Waldron Phoenix Belknap Jr. Research Library of American Painting, donated by Belknap's mother after her son's death at the age of 50.

== Education, career, and military service ==
Belknap was born in New York City to parents Waldron Phoenix Belknap and Rebecca Rey Hutchings. His paternal ancestors were Dutch who came from Holland to New Amsterdam and the Hudson Valley in the 1600s.

Belknap came from a wealthy family—his father was an investment banker who served as vice president of Bankers Trust Company in New York, while his mother, who died in 1959, inherited considerable and highly lucrative shares in Texas oil land and mineral rights.

Belknap graduated with high honors from St. Paul's School, a college-preparatory boarding school located in Concord, New Hampshire, in 1916. He enrolled in Harvard College that year but postponed his education to enlist in the army in October 1917 after the United States entered World War I. Commissioned a second lieutenant in the coastal defense artillery in 1918, Belknap served stateside until the war ended, when he was discharged but continued to serve as a second lieutenant in the Officers Reserve Corps from 1918 to 1923. He returned to Harvard and received his Bachelor of Arts degree in 1920.

Bowing to his father's wishes, Belknap spent eight years following graduation working as an investment banker in New York, Boston, and London. Feeling unfulfilled by his career, he enrolled in the Harvard School of Architecture, earned his master's degree in 1933, and spent the next decade working as an independent professional architect, co-founding a firm in Boston. Business grew slowly during the Great Depression, and his designs reflected his clientele of conservative businessmen.

When the United States entered World War II, Belknap volunteered for active duty. A supporter of the Allied cause, he had led the Boston and New England committees of the British War Relief Society from 1940 to 1942, for which Britain awarded him the King's Medal for Service in the Cause of Freedom. He became a U.S. Army Air Forces first lieutenant in 1942, gained a promotion to captain in 1943, and served in England with the Eighth Air Force in 1943–44. Hospitalized with emphysema, he received a medical discharge and returned to Boston in late 1944. He remained in poor health until his death in 1949.

== Art history and legacy ==
A lifelong hobbyist in art, art history, and decorative arts, Belknap became a committed amateur art historian during his convalescence. Even though he published only one article in his lifetime (a seven-page piece on "The Identity of Robert Feke" in Art Bulletin in September 1947), Belknap's research revealed that "the vast majority of portrait paintings executed in America before the American Revolution owed their compositions in some way to British portrait engravings, primarily mezzotints." Whereas patriotic historians had traditionally emphasized colonial art's Yankee ingenuity and freedom from Old World influences, Belknap established that colonial portrait painters depended on imported mezzotints for their notions of style and fashion and routinely imitated British backgrounds, poses, costumes, and other design elements. John Marshall Philips, director of the Yale University Art Gallery, publicized his friend's findings at the annual meeting of the College Art Association in 1952. Philips prepared The Waldron Phoenix Belknap Jr. Collection of Portraits and Silver (Belknap Press of the Harvard University Press, 1955), which documented some of Belknap's discoveries. Edited by Winterthur Museum staff, Belknap's notes were posthumously published in book form as American Colonial Painting: Materials for a History (Belknap Press, 1959).

Belknap left half of his estate to be evenly divided between three friends and bequeathed most of the rest to Harvard University to endow the Belknap Press, established in 1954 and intended to parallel the Clarendon Press at Oxford University. Belknap's mother augmented the endowment, which stood at $5 million in 1983. She assembled his notes, photographs, and papers and arranged for their publication. She also donated the Waldron Phoenix Belknap Jr. Research Library of American Painting to the Winterthur Museum, Garden and Library and arranged for Charles Coleman Sellers to become the librarian in charge of the collection and her son's papers.

The Belknap family papers comprising thirty-two boxes are held in the archives of the Winterthur Museum, Garden and Library.

== Personal life ==
Belknap was a lifelong bachelor who fathered no children. He was a member of the American Institute of Architects, life member of the New-York Historical Society, and hereditary member of the Society of the Cincinnati.
