= Cellar =

Cellar may refer to:

- Basement
- Root cellar
- Semi-basement
- Storm cellar
- Wine cellar

== See also ==
- The Cellar (disambiguation)
- Night-cellar
- Salt cellar
- Sellers (disambiguation)
