= Climate Change Research Centre =

Research initiative at the University of New South Wales

The Climate Change Research Centre (CCRC) is a research initiative established in 2007 at the University of New South Wales. It is the lead node of the Australian Research Council's Centre of Excellence for Climate Extremes (CLEX), and formerly led the ARC Centre of Excellence for Climate System Science (ARCCSS) from 2011 to 2018.

== History ==
The CCRC was established in 2007 at the University of New South Wales. The foundation directors of the CCRC were the Australian Research Council (ARC) Federation Fellow Professor Matthew England, who established the Climate and Environmental Dynamics Laboratory in 2005, and Professor Andrew Pitman, the director of the ARC Centre of Excellence for Climate Extremes.

The Centre led the ARC Centre of Excellence for Climate System Science from 2011 until its 7-year funding ended on 30 June 2018.

== Organisation and description ==
The director of the centre is Professor Katrin Meissner. The CCRC is the University of New South Wales lead node of the ARC Centre of Excellence for Climate Extremes (2017-2025).

The centre's research falls into ten broad categories:

- Climate
- Oceanography
- Atmospheric Science
- Ecosystems
- Carbon Cycle
- Terrestrial Processes
- Climate Impacts
- Energy Policy
- Climate Model Evaluation
- Palaeoclimatology
