= Sellers =

Sellers may refer to

- Seller, someone who sells
- Sellers, Missouri, an unincorporated community
- Sellers, South Carolina, a small US town
- USS Sellers (DDG-11), a US Navy destroyer
- Sellers (surname), people with the surname Sellers

== See also ==
- Cellar (disambiguation)
- Fort Sellers
- Sellars
