= Gerald Meehl =

Gerald Allen Meehl
- Born: May 21, 1951 (age 75); Denver, Colorado
- Education: University of Colorado Boulder
- Awards: The Editor's Award from the Journal of Climate in 1999, Jule G. Charney Award from the American Meteorological Society in 2009
- Scientific career
- Fields: Climatology, atmospheric science
- Workplaces: National Center for Atmospheric Research
- Thesis: Interactions between the Asian monsoons, the tropical Pacific, and the southern hemisphere extratropics (1987)

Gerald Allen "Jerry" Meehl (born 1951) is a climate scientist who has been a senior scientist at the National Center for Atmospheric Research since 2001.

== Early life and education ==
Meehl, who was born in Denver, is the son of a family of wheat farmers from Hudson. It was the conversations Meehl had with his father about the future weather, and how that might affect their crops, that sparked his interest in the weather and climate. He received his B.S. (with distinction), M.S., and PhD from the University of Colorado Boulder.

== Scientific career ==
He was a lead author of the sixth chapter of the IPCC Second Assessment Report, published in 1995, and helped oversee the chapter about climate projections in the IPCC AR4, published in 2007. He is an ISI highly cited researcher, and is known for his research linking global warming to extreme weather. He has also done much research into the use of global climate models. One of these studies, in which Meehl et al. showed that models could not reproduce recent warming without including anthropogenic influences, was featured in a 2004 review of climate science by the George W. Bush administration. His research has also shown that record high temperatures in the continental United States were more than twice as common as record lows in the 2000s, that it may soon be possible to predict heat waves three weeks in advance (rather than 10 days, which is the best current forecasts can do), and that the global warming hiatus observed over the last 15 years or so may be caused by more heat accumulating in the deep ocean. When Meehl joined Matthew England to publish one such study in Nature Climate Change in 2014, Meehl said that this study "...makes the case that, though other factors could contribute somewhat to the early-2000s hiatus, the Pacific is a major driving force in producing naturally-occurring climate variability that can overwhelm the warming from ever-increasing greenhouse gases to produce the hiatus." He also proposed that this occurred because of the Interdecadal Pacific Oscillation switching to its negative phase. In September 2014, Meehl et al. published another study on this topic, in which they attempted to simulate the hiatus with currently available climate models. They found that these models were able to simulate the hiatus, and concluded that it was largely caused by natural variability.

== Awards and honors ==
In 1999, Meehl received the editor's award from the Journal of Climate. He also received the Jule G. Charney Award from the American Meteorological Society in 2009, and was elected a fellow of the American Geophysical Union in 2014. In 2023 he received the Sverdrup Gold Medal Award of the American Meteorological Society.

== Other writings ==
Meehl has also written several historical books about World War II in the Pacific. His interest in World War II began when he heard his uncles tell stories about their experiences fighting in the war when he was growing up, and he focused on the Pacific because he was sent on an expedition to Tutuila while an undergraduate at the University of Colorado.
