= Katrin Meissner (scientist) =

Climate scientist

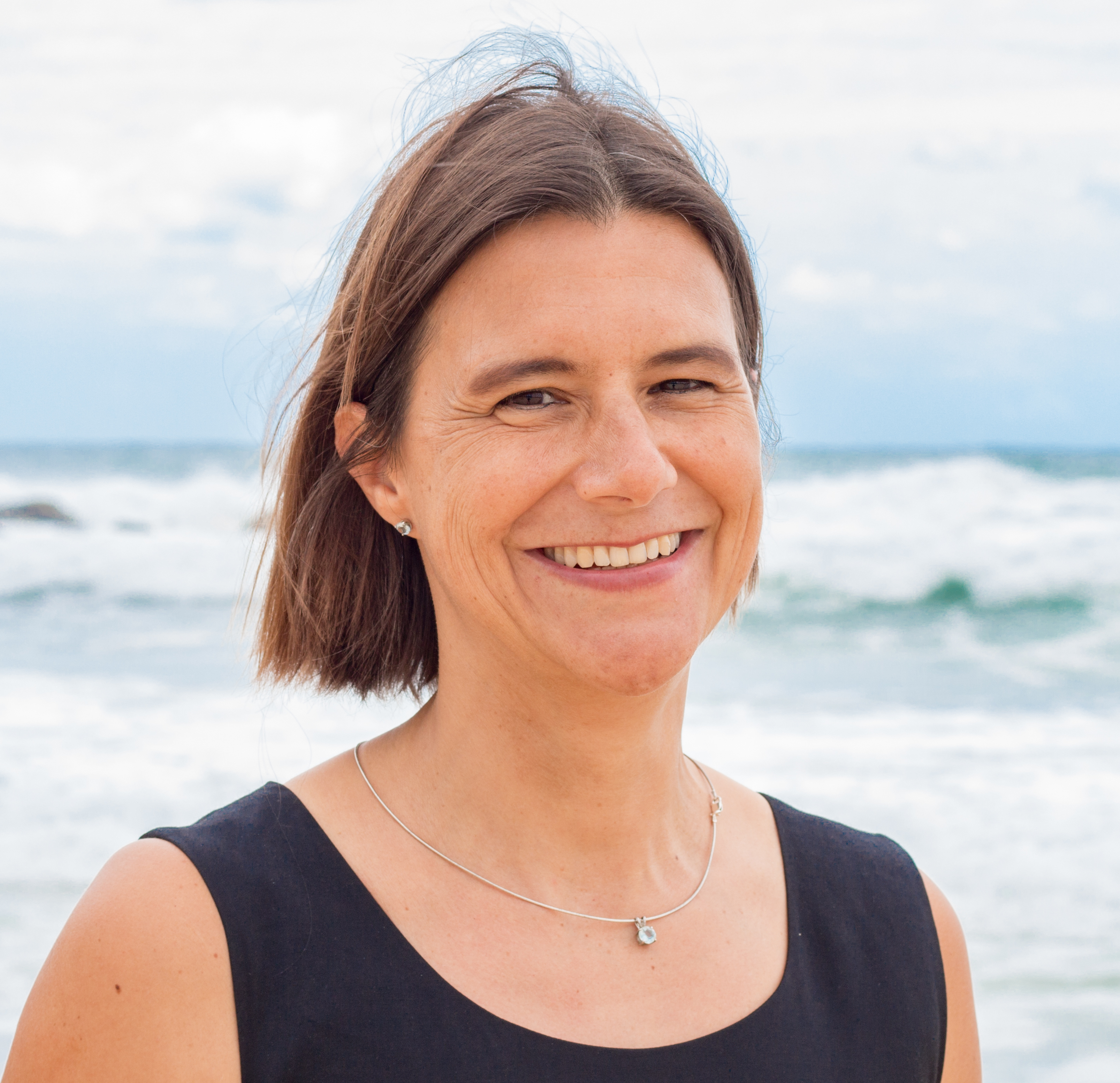
- Education: Universität Bremen; Ecole Centrale de Lille
- Scientific career
- Fields: Ocean and climate change research
- Workplaces: University of New South Wales
- Thesis: Langfristige Variabilität der thermohalinen Zirkulation in einem gekoppelten Ozean-, Meereis-, Atmosphärenmodell (1999)

Katrin Juliane Meissner is an Australian-German physical oceanographer and climate scientist known for climate models assessing the impact of abrupt climate change on terrestrial and marine biogeochemical cycling.

== Education and career ==
Meissner grew up in Berlin, Germany, where she attended the Französisches Gymnasium Berlin. Meissner completed an engineering degree at the Ecole Centrale de Lille in 1995. Meissner moved to the Université Pierre et Marie Curie, Paris VI, France where she investigated the predictability of the West African monsoon based on ocean-atmosphere fluxes off the coast of Senegal. Meissner received her Ph.D. at the Alfred Wegener Institute for Polar and Marine Research at the Universität Bremen, Germany in 1999. She developed an atmosphere model and a sea ice model and coupled both to an existing ocean model to study the long-term variability of the thermohaline circulation. For this work she received the Annette Barthelt Prize for outstanding research in the field of marine science in 2000.

Meissner completed a postdoc at the University of Victoria, Canada, 2000-2002 and subsequently was an assistant professor there in the School of Earth and Ocean Sciences from 2002 until 2009. In 2009, she moved to the University of New South Wales, Sydney, Australia. Her relocation from a tenure-track position in Victoria was in part due to the long term issues of reduced funding for climate change science across Canada. In 2010, she was awarded an Australian Research Council Future Fellowship. In 2020 she was named a Fellow of the Royal Society of New South Wales (FRSN).

As of 2021, she is the Director of the Climate Change Research Centre and holds an adjunct professor position at the University of Victoria, Canada and a courtesy position at Oregon State University. She is a member of the Committee of Experts for the German Excellence Strategy.

Meissner is on the steering committee for the PAGES (Past Global Changes) project which coordinates and promotes climate change research. In 2015, she was one of the featured scientists in Joe Duggan's project about emotions of scientists whose work focuses on climate change. This project was followed up in 2020. Meissner also voiced her concerns about climate change in an episode of ABC’s Lateline in 2017 and in an opinion article in the Sydney Morning Herald. She is an active reviewer of "Climate Feedback" for ABC's Media Watch. In June 2018, she was a co-author of a paper in Nature Geoscience which posited that current model-based climate projections could be greatly underestimating the rate of warming.

== Research ==
Meissner's primary area of research and scientific engagement centers on climate change. While at the University of Victoria, she coupled a dynamic vegetation model and a land surface scheme to an atmosphere-ocean-sea ice climate model and introduced several isotopic tracers into a climate model to facilitate comparison with paleoproxies in climate archives.

In her research on abrupt climate change events, Meissner has developed and coupled several components to existing Earth System Climate Models which help facilitate comparison to past climate archives and incorporate complex earth processes into the models. Meissner also combines climate models with palaeoclimate records to increase understanding of the basic mechanisms of climate variability and climate change, particularly in the context of marine and terrestrial biogeochemical cycles, ocean circulation, and the changing chemical environment of coral reefs. The work of her and her team developed model studies on rapid climate changes in Australia.

=== Selected publications ===
- Eby, M.; Montenegro, A.; Archer, D.; Meissner, K.J. (2009). "Lifetime of anthropogenic climate change: Millennial time-scales of potential CO2 and surface temperature perturbations". Journal of Climate. 22 (7): 2501–2511. Bibcode:2009JCli...22.2501E. doi:10.1175/2008JCLI2554.1. S2CID 36845074.
- Meissner, K.J.; Weaver, A.J.; Matthews, H.D.; Cox, P.M. (2003). "The role of land-surface dynamics in glacial inception: a study with the UVic Earth System Model". Climate Dynamics. 21 (7–8): 515–537. Bibcode:2003ClDy...21..515M. doi:10.1007/s00382-003-0352-2. S2CID 29381932.
- Avis, C.A.A.; Weaver, A.J.; Meissner, K.J. (2011). "Evolution of high-latitude wetlands in response to permafrost thaw". Nature Geoscience. 4 (7): 444–448. doi:10.1038/ngeo1160.
- Fischer, H.; Meissner, K.J.; Mix, A. C.; Abram, N.J.; Austermann, J.; Brovkin, V.; et al. (2018). "Palaeoclimate constraints on the impact of 2 °C anthropogenic warming and beyond" (PDF). Nature Geoscience. 11 (7): 474–485. Bibcode:2018NatGe..11..474F. doi:10.1038/s41561-018-0146-0. Wikidata Q56658823.
- Meissner, K.J.; Lippmann, T.; Sen Gupta, A. (2012). "Large-scale stress factors affecting coral reefs: open ocean sea surface temperature and surface seawater aragonite saturation over the next 400 years". Coral Reefs. 31 (2): 309–319. Bibcode:2012CorRe..31..309M. doi:10.1007/s00338-011-0866-8. S2CID 16814102.

== Awards and honors ==
- Annette Barthelt Prize (2000)
- Fellow, Royal Society of New South Wales (2020)
- Petersen Excellence Professorship (2023)

== Recent media ==
- Taking the Temperature of Climate Science. The Pulse. 07 April 2023
- No one wants to be right about this: climate scientists’ horror and exasperation as global predictions play out. The Guardian. 25 July 2023
