= Sophie Kline =

American politician (1902–1975)

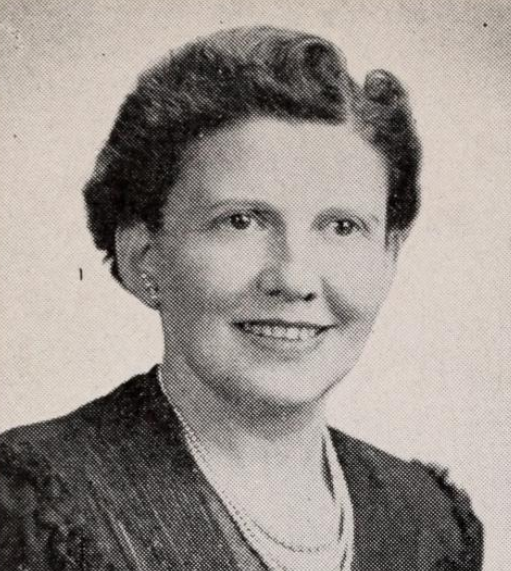
- Kline c. 1946

Member of the Connecticut House of Representatives from Meriden
- In office 1945–1947 Serving with William A. Jacobs
- Preceded by: Charles E. Hackbarth; Joseph F. Papallo
- Succeeded by: Benjamin J. Kopacz; Alfred R. Tomassetti
- In office 1949–1951 Serving with Anthony Miller
- Preceded by: Benjamin J. Kopacz; Alfred R. Tomassetti
- Succeeded by: Anthony Miller; Alfred J. Ring

Personal details
- Born: Sophie Zysk; January 24, 1902 Worcester, Massachusetts, U.S.
- Died: September 1, 1975 (aged 73) Meriden, Connecticut, U.S.
- Party: Democratic
- Spouse: William A. Kline (m. 1927; died 1969)
- Children: 2
- Education: Pequod Business School

Sophie Kline (née Zysk; January 24, 1902 – September 1, 1975) was an American politician who served in the Connecticut House of Representatives from 1945 to 1947 and 1949 to 1951, representing the town of Meriden as a Democrat.

== Personal life ==
Sophie Zysk was born on January 24, 1902, in Worcester, Massachusetts, to Florian and Mary Zysk. She attended Pequod Business School, a business and secretarial school in Meriden, Connecticut. She married William A. Kline in 1927, and she had two daughters. William died in 1969.

== Political career ==
A Democrat, Kline was first elected to the Connecticut House of Representatives in 1944, and she served one term representing the town of Meriden alongside William A. Jacobs. Kline was the first woman elected to the Connecticut General Assembly from Meriden. She was a member of the Public Welfare and Humane Institutions Committee. Kline unsuccessfully ran for reelection in 1946.

Kline was elected to a second term in 1948, and she served alongside Anthony Miller. She served on the Public Welfare and Humane Institutions Committee and the Federal and Intergovernmental Relations Committee. In May 1949, she was also assigned to the Education Committee in place of Representative Helen Earle Sellers, who was ill and would not return to the legislative session. Kline unsuccessfully ran for reelection in 1950. Miller and Alfred J. Ring succeeded her in 1951.

== Death ==
Kline died on September 1, 1975, at the World War II Veterans Memorial Hospital in Meriden, Connecticut. She was 73.
