= Butter-Cake Dick's =

Defunct café in New York City

- Location within Manhattan

Restaurant information
- Owner: Richard Marshall
- Location: Spruce Street, Manhattan, NYC, New York, USA
- Coordinates: 40°42′41″N 74°00′19″W

Butter-Cake Dick's was a Manhattan café in the cellar of the New-York Daily Tribune building in Spruce Street. It was named after the proprietor, Richard Marshall, who had been a newsman but now sold butter-cakes, also known as sinkers, which were a type of rich biscuit containing a knob of butter. It was open all night and did good business with newsboys and politicians from the nearby Tammany Hall who would treat journalists to a butter-cake as a form of patronage or bribe. In the 1850s, the price of a butter-cake with a cup of coffee was three cents.

They are always hot and always ready, with the butter dripping at the edges, where the severed halves have been put together, and the outside surfaces crisp and blackened, as if they had been lying for a long time on a hot tin...

I could look from my post across the Park and see the genial light of this haven of refuge, the windows deliciously frosted with congealed coffee-steam. O, how I wanted coffee!
