= Seller (surname) =

Seller is a surname. Notable people with the surname include:

- Abednego Seller (died 1705), English writer
- Chris Seller (born 1977), Canadian lacrosse player
- Jeffrey Seller (born 1964), American theatrical producer
- John Seller (1632–1697), English cartographer
- Kathryn Dyakanoff Seller (1884–1980), Aleut educator
- Robert Seller (1889–1967), French actor
- William Seller (1797–1869), Scottish botanist
- Wolf Dieter Seller, German canoeist

== See also ==
- Sellar
- Sellers (surname)
