= 2006 United Nations Climate Change Conference =

United Nations Climate Change Conference COP12/MOP2
- Dates: 6 November 2006– 17 November 2006
- Locations: Nairobi, Kenya
- Previous event: ← Montreal 2005
- Next event: Bali 2007 →
- Participants: UNFCCC member countries
- Website: Report of the conference of the parties

The 2006 United Nations Climate Change Conference took place between November 6 and 17, 2006 in Nairobi, Kenya. The conference included the 12th Conference of the Parties to the UN Framework Convention on Climate Change (UNFCCC) (COP12) and the second Meeting of the Parties to the Kyoto Protocol (MOP2).

At the meeting, BBC reporter Richard Black coined the phrase "climate tourists" to describe some delegates who attended "to see Africa, take snaps of the wildlife, the poor, dying African children and women". Black also noted that due to delegates' concerns over economic costs and possible losses of competitiveness, the majority of the discussions avoided any mention of reducing emissions. Black concluded that was a disconnect between the political process and the scientific imperative. Despite such criticism, certain strides were made at COP12, including in the areas of support for developing countries and clean development mechanism. The parties adopted a five-year plan of work to support climate change adaptation by developing countries, and agreed on the procedures and modalities for the Adaptation Fund. They also agreed to improve the projects for clean development mechanism.
