= Bali Communiqué =

On 30 November 2007, the business leaders of 150 global companies published a communiqué to world leaders calling for a comprehensive, legally binding United Nations framework to tackle climate change.

The initiative represents an unprecedented coming together of the international business community and includes some of the biggest companies and brands from around the world, including the United States, Europe, Australia and China.

It has been led by The Prince of Wales's UK and EU Corporate Leaders Groups on Climate Change, which are developed and run by the Cambridge Programme for Sustainability Leadership.

It was hoped that the Bali Communiqué would have a significant impact on the UN climate negotiations starting on 3 December 2007 in Bali, Indonesia (see 2007 United Nations Climate Change Conference).

The Bali Communiqué calls for:

- a comprehensive, legally binding United Nations framework to tackle climate change
- emission reduction targets to be guided primarily by science
- those countries that have already industrialised to make the greatest effort
- world leaders to seize the window of opportunity and agree on a work plan of negotiations to ensure an agreement can come into force after 2012 (when the existing Kyoto Protocol expires)

== Text ==
The Bali Communiqué reads as follows:

This communiqué comes from the business leaders of over 150 global companies. It is being issued in advance of the United Nations Climate Change Conference 2007, taking place from December 3 to 14 in Bali, Indonesia.

The scientific evidence is now overwhelming. Climate change presents very serious global social, environmental and economic risks and it demands an urgent global response.

As business leaders, it is our belief that the benefits of strong, early action on climate change outweigh the costs of not acting:

The economic and geopolitical costs of unabated climate change could be very severe and globally disruptive. All countries and economies will be affected, but it will be the poorest countries that will suffer earliest and the most. The costs of action to reduce greenhouse gas emissions in order to avoid the worst impacts of climate change are manageable, especially if guided by a common international vision. Each year we delay action to control global emissions increases the risk of unavoidable consequences that will likely necessitate even steeper reductions in the future, causing potentially greater economic, environmental and social disruption. The shift to a low-carbon economy will create significant business opportunities. New markets for low-carbon technologies and products, worth billions of dollars, will be created if the world acts on the scale required. In summary, we believe that tackling climate change is the pro-growth strategy. Ignoring it will ultimately undermine economic growth.

It is our view that a sufficiently ambitious, international and comprehensive legally binding United Nations agreement to reduce greenhouse gas emissions will provide business with the certainty it needs to scale up global investment in low-carbon technologies. We believe that an enhanced and extended carbon market needs to be part of this framework as it offers the necessary flexibility, allows for a cost-effective transition and provides financial support to developing countries.

In order to avoid dangerous climate change, the overall targets for emissions reduction must be guided primarily by science. Even an immediate peaking in global emissions would require a subsequent reduction of at least 50% by 2050, according to the Fourth Assessment Report of the Intergovernmental Panel of Climate Change, and the later the peak in emissions, the greater the required reduction. All countries will need to play their part but we recognise that the greatest effort must be made by those countries that have already industrialised.

At the United Nations Climate Change Conference in December in Bali, Indonesia, countries will have an opportunity to agree a work-plan of comprehensive negotiations to ensure such an agreement can be signed in Copenhagen in 2009, to come into force after 2012.

We urge world leaders to seize this window of opportunity.

In return, we pledge to engage positively with governments to help develop the policies and measures that are needed internationally and nationally for the business sector to contribute effectively to building a low carbon economy.

== See also ==
- Bali Road Map
