= The Cellar (Macy's) =

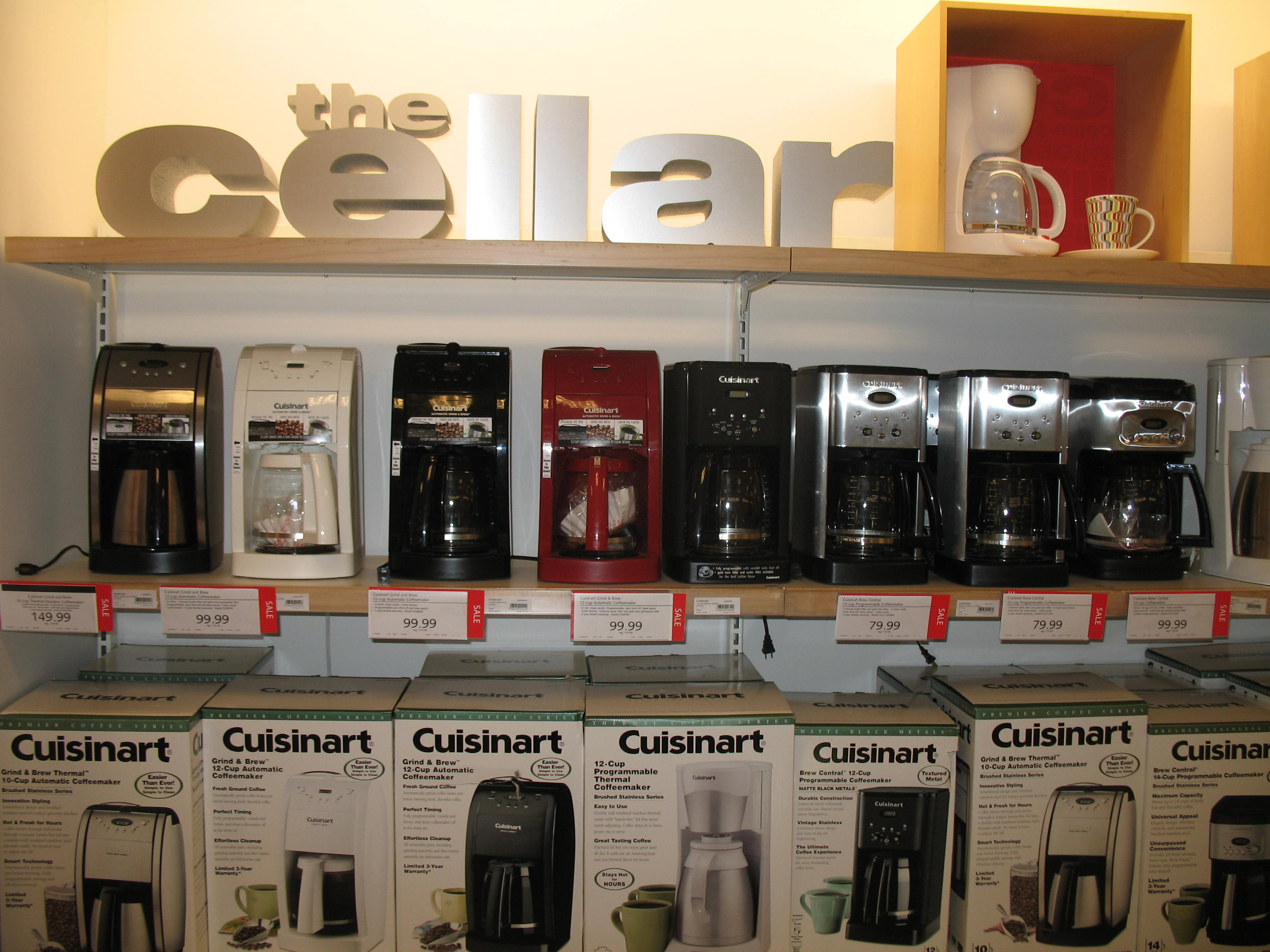
Kitchen appliances with the Cellar logo

The Cellar is a brand name used by Macy's for departments commonly located on the first floor below ground level at larger stores. Although every Macy's has such a department, only the larger flagships have basement-level space devoted to the Cellar concept.

The concept was pioneered in 1971 as a gourmet kitchenware marketing concept in the San Francisco flagship store of the Macy's West division. In 1974, the Macy's West president Edward Finkelstein was promoted to the president of Macy's New York and brought the Cellar concept with him. The Cellar theme covers appliances, fixtures, kitchenware, and tableware. Macy's stocks a wide range of brands in the cellar, including upscale and gourmet brands, as well as two private labels: "Tools of the Trade" for cookware, cutlery, and kitchen gadgets; and "The Cellar" for flatware, dinnerware, and glassware. Finkelstein acknowledged that The Cellar's design was influenced by other stores including Harrods, Pottery Barn, and Crate & Barrel.

In August 2006, the Chicago flagship's basement level transitioned to this concept in preparation from the September Marshall Field's conversion. It did so by posting the themed logos as pictured in its housewares department.
