= Night-cellar =

Historical term for late-night drinking cellar in England

"The Idle 'Prentice betrayed and taken in a Night-Cellar with his Accomplice". William Hogarth depicted notorious Blood Bowl House in Industry and Idleness.

A night-cellar is a cellar which is open for business at night, typically providing food, drink and entertainment. There were many such in London in the 18th century and they were often disreputable.

== London ==
George Augustus Sala wrote an account of Evans's Supper Rooms in 1852. This was a famous supper club which would serve hearty food and raucous entertainment in the middle of the night – as late as one in the morning. But he lamented that the night-cellars of the previous century had mostly disappeared in London:

A century since ... this town of London was full of choice holes and corners, known under the generic name of "night cellars." You may see in Liverpool to this day – and I am told, also, in New York — some flourishing specimens of these inviting localities, but they have almost died out in London. The White Horse Cellar in Piccadilly is now a booking-office; the Shades in Leicester Square (underneath Saville House), once Pennant's "pouting house for princes," is a restaurant; the cellar of the Ship at Charing Cross is yet a tavern, but is used more as a waiting-room for passengers by the Kent Road and Deptford omnibuses; and a whole nest of cellars were swept away by the Adamses when the Adelphi Terrace, with a worse range of cellars beneath, as it afterwards turned out, was constructed. But the night cellars of a hundred years ago! What dens, what sinks, what roaring saturnalia of very town scoundrelism they must have been!

...

in this bad place, among these ruffianly companions! horse-jockeys, highwaymen-captains, unfrocked parsons; deboshed adventurers, redolent of twopenny ordinaries and Mount Scoundrel in the Fleet; disbanded lieutenants of phantom regiments; scriveners struck off the rolls, ruined spendthrifts, Irish desperadoes enthusiastic for the Pretender and other men's pence, bankrupt traders, French and Italian rascals flagrant from the galleys of foreign seaports, and all, according to their own showing, distressed patriots; German swindlers and card-sharpers, who declare themselves to be Counts of the Holy Roman Empire, Jew coin-clippers and diamond-slicers, riverside vagabonds in the pay of the commanders of press-gangs on the look-out for benighted journeymen, or dissolute lads who have run away from their apprenticeship or quarrelled with their parents, recruiting crimps for both sexes, usurers looking for prodigals who have yet money to lose, bailiffs' followers looking for prodigals who have lost all and owe more; and, scattered among all this scum of frantic knavery and ragabosh, some gay young sprigs of aristocracy, some officers in the regiment of Guards, some noisy young country esquires of the Western type. This, all garnished with dirt and spilt liquors, with the fumes of rum, Geneva, punch, wine, and tobacco smoke, with oaths and shrieks and horrid songs, with the clatter of glasses and tankards, the clash of rapiers and verberations of bludgeons – is the London night cellar of a hundred years ago. Round Covent Garden such places positively swarmed. The Strand, the neighbourhood of Exeter 'Change, Long Acre, and Drury Lane, reeked with dens of this description. For hereabouts were the playhouses, and in their purlieus, as in those of cathedrals, you must expect to find, and do find, in every age, the haunts of vice and dissipation. It may be profane to say ubi apis ibi mel: but such is the sorry fact.

== New York ==
In the 1840s, there was a popular night-cellar in New York called Butter-Cake Dick's. This was a favourite of the b'hoys and g'hals – the rough young folk of lower Manhattan. Later in the US, cellar bars and clubs became known as dives because one could dive into them without being seen.
