= Charles Coleman Sellers =

American librarian and historian (1903–1980)

- Born: March 16, 1903; Overbrook, Philadelphia, US
- Died: January 31, 1980 (aged 76); Sydney, Australia
- Education: Haverford College (BA 1925), Harvard University (MA 1926), Temple University (PhD 1957)
- Occupations: Historian, biographer, librarian
- Employer(s): Wesleyan University, Dickinson College, Winterthur Museum, Garden and Library
- Spouse: Helen Earle Sellers (m. 1932; died 1951)
- Awards: Bancroft Prize (1970)

Charles Coleman Sellers (March 16, 1903 – January 31, 1980) was an American historian, biographer, and librarian who won the Bancroft Prize in 1970 for his biography of American painter Charles Willson Peale. Sellers was a long-time librarian at Dickinson College and also held positions at Wesleyan University and the Winterthur Museum, Garden and Library.

== Early life and education ==
Sellers was born in the Overbrook neighborhood of Philadelphia, Pennsylvania, to parents Horace Wells Sellers, an architect, and Cora (Wells) Sellers, Horace's first cousin. He was a great-grandson of Charles Willson Peale. Sellers graduated from Haverford College with a BA in 1925 and Harvard University with an MA in 1926, and Temple University with a PhD in 1957.

== Career and service ==
Sellers worked as a writer and researcher from 1927 and, together with his wife, owned and operated Tracey's Book Store in Hebron, Connecticut, from 1932 to 1938. He also acted in amateur theatrical productions and authored three plays that were produced in the 1930s and 1940s. He served as the bibliographic librarian at Wesleyan University from 1937 to 1949. He simultaneously served as a research associate for the American Philosophical Society in Philadelphia from 1947 to 1951.

In 1949 he became curator of the Dickinsoniana Collection at Dickinson College and became head librarian of the college in 1956 after May Morris retired. He also became the librarian in charge of the Waldron Phoenix Belknap Jr. Research Library of American Painting at the Winterthur Museum, Garden and Library, organizing this newly established collection and editing and publishing Belknap's research notes between 1956 and 1959. With the opening of the May Morris Room in the new Boyd Lee Spahr Library, Sellers once again became historian and curator of the Dickinsoniana Collection in 1968. He held this appointment until his retirement in 1979, when Dickinson College awarded him an honorary doctorate of letters. He also received an honorary doctor of laws degree from Temple University.

Sellers co-conceived a 1983 exhibition of Peale's work at the Metropolitan Museum of Art. He became editor of the American Colonial Painting magazine in 1959 and became an elected member of the American Philosophical Society in 1979. He was a member of the American Association of University Professors (Dickinson College chapter president, 1961–62) and the College Art Association. His papers are held at the American Philosophical Society and the Smithsonian Institution.

== Personal life ==
On October 6, 1932, Sellers married actor and poet Helen Earle Gilbert (died February 1951). On June 12, 1952, he married Barbara Stow Roberts (died September 1979). He had two children from his first marriage: Horace Wells Sellers III and Susan Pendleton Siemanoski. He died in Sydney, Australia, while visiting his daughter there.

== Publications ==
- Lorenzo Dow: The Bearer of the Word. Minton, Balch & Company. 1928.
- Benedict Arnold: The Proud Warrior. Minton, Balch & Company. 1930.
- Theophilus the Battle-Axe: A History of the Lives and Adventures of Theophilus Ransom Gates and the Battle-Axes. Patterson & White Co. 1930.
- The Artist of the Revolution: The Early Life of Charles Willson Peale. Feather & Good. 1939.
- Portraits and Miniatures by Charles Willson Peale. American Philosophical Society. 1952.
- (Editor) Waldron Phoenix Belknap. American Colonial Painting. Belknap Press. 1959.
- Benjamin Franklin in Portraiture. Yale University Press. 1962. ISBN 978-0-300-00893-7.
- Charles Willson Peale: A Biography. Scribner. 1969. (Bancroft Prize, 1970)
- Dickinson College: A History. Wesleyan University Press. 1973. ISBN 9780819540577.
- Patience Wright: American Artist and Spy in George III's London. Wesleyan University Press. 1976. ISBN 978-0-8195-5001-9.
- Mr. Peale's Museum: Charles Willson Peale and the First Popular Museum of Natural Science and Art. W. W. Norton & Company. 1980. ISBN 978-0-393-05700-3.
