= Helen Earle Sellers =

American writer and politician (1903–1951)

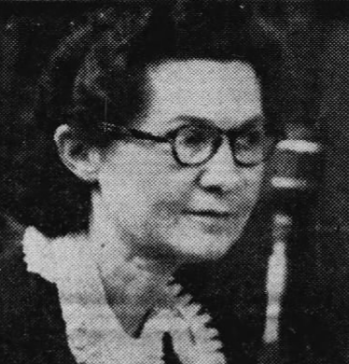
- Sellers in 1950

Member of the Connecticut House of Representatives from Hebron
- In office 1941–1943 Serving with Elton W. Buell
- Preceded by: Mildred A. Fillmore; Walter E. Wright
- Succeeded by: Elton W. Buell; Harold L. Gray
- In office 1949–1951 Serving with Irving L. Griffin
- Preceded by: Edward W. Promprowicz; Fitch N. Jones
- Succeeded by: Natalie Jones; Richard Grant

Personal details
- Born: Helen Earle Gilbert; September 2, 1903 Hebron, Connecticut, U.S.
- Died: February 13, 1951 (aged 47) Carlisle, Pennsylvania, U.S.
- Party: Democratic
- Spouse: Charles Coleman Sellers (m. 1932)
- Children: 2

Helen Earle Sellers (September 2, 1903 – February 13, 1951) was an American writer and politician from Connecticut. She wrote under her maiden name, Helen Earle Gilbert. From 1941 to 1943 and 1949 to 1951, Sellers served in the Connecticut House of Representatives, representing the town of Hebron as a Democrat.

== Personal life ==
Helen Earle Gilbert was born in Hebron, Connecticut, on September 2, 1903, to Horace and Anne Pendleton Gilbert. She married historian and biographer Charles Coleman Sellers in October 1932. In the 1930s, they owned and operated a used bookstore. Together, they had two children, Horace and Susan.

Sellers died in Carlisle, Pennsylvania, on February 13, 1951. She was 47.

== Career ==
=== Connecticut House of Representatives ===
A Democrat, Sellers was first elected to the Connecticut House of Representatives in 1940. She served one term representing the town of Hebron alongside Republican Elton W. Buell and was a member of the education committee. She was not a candidate for reelection in 1942 and left office in 1943.

Sellers was again elected to represent Hebron in the Connecticut House of Representatives in 1948, and she served alongside fellow Democrat Irving L. Griffin. She was assigned to the education committee. In May 1949, Speaker of the House John R. Thim announced that Sellers was ill and would not return to the current legislative session. Representative Sophie Kline was assigned to the education committee in Sellers' place. Sellers was not a candidate for reelection in 1950 and left office in 1951. She and Griffin were succeeded by Natalie Jones and Richard Grant.

During her first term in the House, Sellers worked as a special assistant at the secretary of the state's office. Chase G. Woodhouse credited Sellers and Leonard C. Shefflot with compiling the 1941 Connecticut State Register and Manual.

=== Writing ===
Sellers published plays, poetry, and children's books under her maiden name, Helen Earle Gilbert. At the time of her death, she was writing a biography of activist Prudence Crandall. Sellers' research materials on Crandall's life were left to the Linda Lear Center for Special Collections and Archives at Connecticut College following her death.

== Publications ==
- Mrs. Mallaby's Birthday (Illustrated by Winifred Bromhall). Rand McNally. 1939.
- Mr. Plum and the Little Green Tree (Illustrated by Margaret Bradfield). Abingdon-Cokesbury Press. 1946.
- Dr. Trotter and His Big Gold Watch (Illustrated by Margaret Bradfield). Abingdon-Cokesbury Press. 1948.
