= Natalie Jones (politician) =

American politician (1897–1965)

Member of the Connecticut House of Representatives from Hebron
- In office 1951–1953 Serving with Richard Grant
- Preceded by: Helen Earle Sellers; Irving L. Griffin
- Succeeded by: Richard Grant; Charles M. Larcomb

Personal details
- Born: Natalie Blume; September 16, 1897 New York City, U.S.
- Died: May 14, 1965 (aged 67) Hartford, Connecticut, U.S.
- Party: Democratic
- Spouse: Claude Jones

Natalie Blume Jones (September 16, 1897 – May 14, 1965) was an American politician who served in the Connecticut House of Representatives from 1951 to 1953, representing the town of Hebron as a Democrat.
