= James Sellar =

James Sellar may refer to:

- James Sellar (footballer), Australian rules footballer
- James Sellar (minister), Scottish minister
- James Sellar (curler), British wheelchair curler
- James Zimri Sellar, Australian politician

== See also ==
- James Sellars, Scottish architect
