= Copenhagen Diagnosis =

2009 climate change report

The Copenhagen Diagnosis is a climate change report written by 26 climate scientists from eight countries. It was published in 2009 and was a summary of the peer-reviewed literature to date. A media conference was held to present the major findings of the report at the 2009 United Nations Climate Change Conference, in Copenhagen, Denmark, chaired by the Copenhagen Diagnosis coordinating lead author, Matthew England.

The Copenhagen Diagnosis aimed to synthesize the most policy-relevant climate science published since the close-off of material for the previous Intergovernmental Panel on Climate Change's Working Group 1 Report (AR4), thus serving as an interim evaluation of the evolving science midway through an IPCC cycle, with IPCC AR5 not due for completion until 2013.

The report also aimed to serve as a handbook of science updates that supplements the IPCC AR4 in time for the 2009 United Nations Climate Change Conference held in December 2009, and for any national or international climate change policy negotiations that followed.

The Copenhagen Diagnosis reached a number of conclusions, as set out in the executive summary, including:

1. Surging greenhouse gas emissions
  - Relative to 1990, the combined 2008 global emissions of carbon dioxide from various sources such as fossil fuel burning, cement production, and deforestation, has increased 27%.
2. Human-induced warming
  - Detection and attribution studies show that global warming can be unambiguously linked to anthropogenic interference in the climate system.
3. Acceleration of ice melt contributions to sea-level
  - Glaciers, ice sheets and melting ice caps show an accelerated rate of melt, contributing to ongoing global sea level rise.
4. Rapid Arctic sea-ice decline
  - Melting of Arctic sea-ice has also accelerated, exceeding the projections of climate models.
5. Underestimation of rising sea levels
  - The recent rate of sea level rise (3.4 mm/yr over the past 15 years) is around 80% faster than previously predicted.
6. The risk of irreversible damage
  - There are several components of the climate system that may undergo irreversible change if fossil fuel emissions continue unchecked, including ice-sheets, Amazon rainforest, and the West African monsoon.
7. Turning point must come soon
  - To limited global warming to 2 degrees Celsius above pre-industrial levels, carbon emissions need to peak in the next decade and then decline rapidly.
8. The Future
  - To stop climate change and secure a safe climate future, the world needs to move to net-zero emissions of CO_{2}.

To maximize global outreach, the major findings of the Copenhagen Diagnosis were translated into 12 languages.

The Copenhagen Diagnosis has been accessed online over a million times since its release, and was named an Outstanding Academic Title by the American Library Association's Choice publication in 2012.
