= Sellars =

Sellars is a surname, and may refer to

- Bill Sellars (1925–2018), British television producer
- Billy Sellars (1907–1987), English footballer
- Doug Sellars (1961–2011), Canadian television executive
- Elizabeth Sellars (1921–2019), British actress
- Ernie Sellars (1890–1955), Australian rules footballer
- Harry Sellars (1902–1978), English footballer who played for Stoke City
- Herbert Sellars (1896–1918), British First World War flying ace
- James Sellars (1843–1888), Scottish architect
- Jerell Sellars, English footballer who played for Aston Villa
- John Sellars (academic administrator), president of Graceland University
- John Sellars (footballer) (1924–1985), English footballer who played for Stoke City
- Les Sellars, Australian rugby league footballer
- Luke Sellars (born 1981), Canadian professional ice hockey player
- M. R. Sellars (born 1962), American writer
- Mandy Sellars (born 1975), British woman possibly afflicted with Proteus syndrome
- Marilyn Sellars (born 1944), American country music and gospel singer
- Michiko Sellars (born 1985), stage name MiChi, Japanese British pop singer
- Peter Sellars (born 1957), American theatre director
- Richard B. Sellars (1915–2010), former chairman and CEO of Johnson & Johnson
- Roy Wood Sellars (1880–1973), Canadian-American philosopher
- Scott Sellars (born 1965), English footballer
- Wilfrid Sellars (1912–1989), American philosopher, son of Roy Wood Sellars

== See also ==
- Sellar
- Sellers (disambiguation)
