= Australian Meteorological and Oceanographic Society =

Non-profit organization

The Australian Meteorological and Oceanographic Society (AMOS) is an independent learned society that supports and fosters interest in Meteorology, Oceanography and other related sciences. AMOS was founded in April 1987 as a successor to the Australian Branch of the Royal Meteorological Society which at the time had existed for 15 years.

== Publications ==
AMOS publishes the bi-monthly Bulletin of the Australian Meteorological and Oceanographic Society, and quarterly the scientific journal Journal of Southern Hemisphere Earth Systems Science (JSHESS), formerly known as the Australian Meteorological and Oceanographic Journal, in association with the Bureau of Meteorology.

== Awards ==
The society awards a number of medals biennially.

- Gibbs Medal – for long-term contribution to operational weather and climate forecasting services.
- Meyers Medal – early career award.
- Morton Medal – recognising leadership with emphasis on education and development of young scientists.
- Priestley Medal – mid-career award.
- Zillman Medal – late career award.

== Statement on Climate Change ==
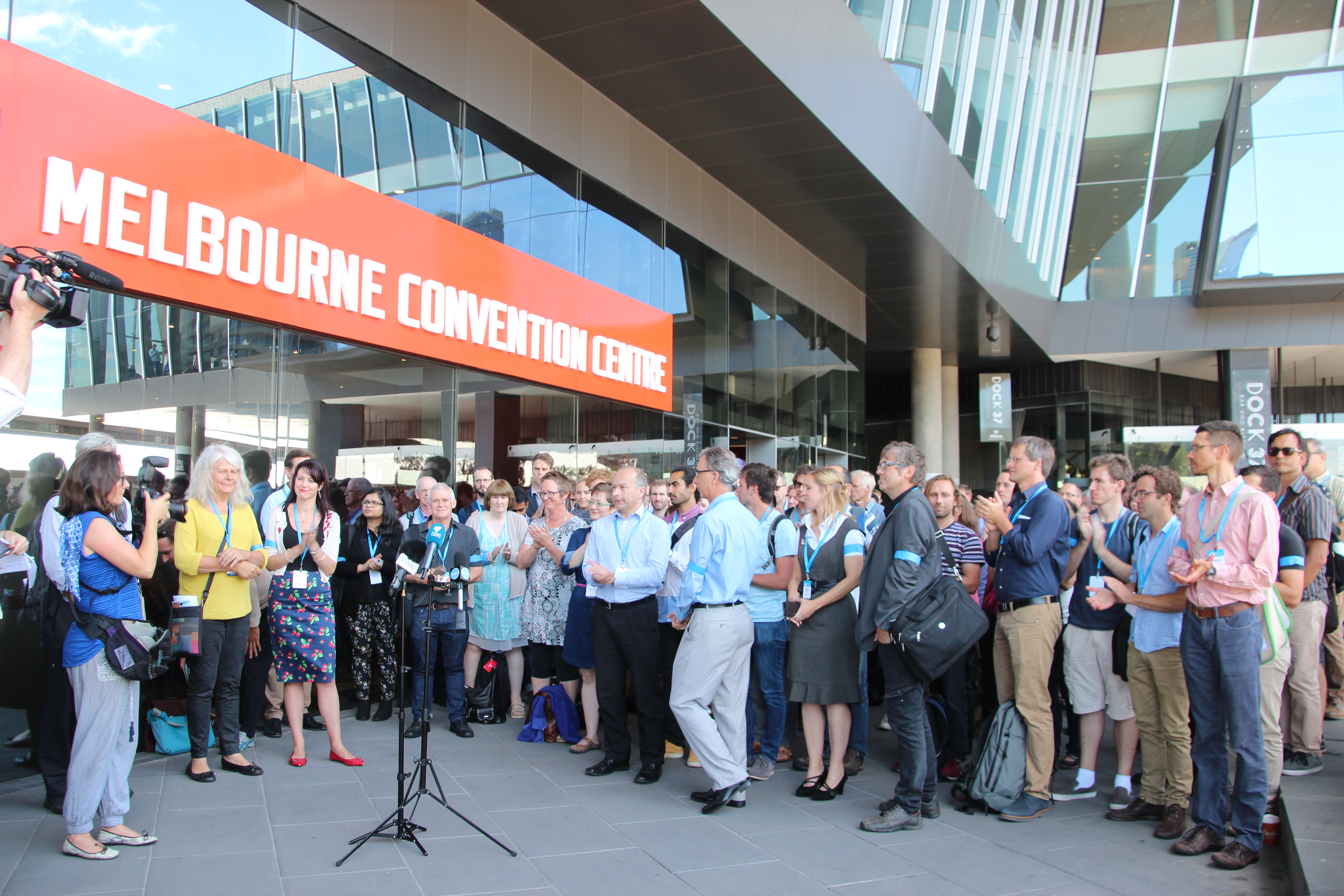
Climate scientists attending the Australian Meteorological and Oceanographic Society (AMOS) climate science conference in Melbourne stage protest against cuts to CSIRO climate research programs. Photo: John Englart

AMOS has issued a Statement on Climate Change, wherein they conclude, “Global climate change and global warming are real and observable…It is highly likely that those human activities that have increased the concentration of greenhouse gases in the atmosphere have been largely responsible for the observed warming since 1950. The warming associated with increases in greenhouse gases originating from human activity is called the enhanced greenhouse effect. The atmospheric concentration of carbon dioxide has increased by more than 30% since the start of the industrial age and is higher now than at any time in at least the past 650,000 years. This increase is a direct result of burning fossil fuels, broad-scale deforestation and other human activity.”

In February 2016 many of the climate scientists attending the annual AMOS conference in Melbourne participated in a lunchtime protest against the CSIRO cuts to climate research programs announced by CSIRO CEO Larry Marshall on 4 February 2016.
