= Bali Declaration by Climate Scientists =

The 2007 Bali Declaration by Climate Scientists was a statement signed by over 200 climate scientists advocating specific targets for greenhouse gas emissions for the 21st century. The statement was based on the United Nations Framework Convention on Climate Change Article 2 that committed signatories to the "...stabilization of greenhouse gas concentrations in the atmosphere at a level that would prevent dangerous anthropogenic interference with the climate system" and on the science available in the Intergovernmental Panel on Climate Change Fourth Assessment report (IPCC AR4). The Bali Declaration was released to coincide with the 2007 United Nations Climate Change Conference which took place in Bali 3–15 December 2007.
