= Ann Henderson-Sellers =

Australian climatologist

- Born: 1952 (age 73–74); Sheffield, United Kingdom
- Education: University of Bristol; University of Leicester (PhD)
- Known for: Chairman of the Australian Academy of Science's National Committee for Climate and Atmospheric Sciences (date TBC); Awarded the Centenary Medal of Australia for Service to Australian Society in Meteorology (2003); Convening author for the IPCC SAR (1995)
- Spouse: Brian Henderson-Sellers
- Scientific career
- Fields: geography; climate modelling; climate change; science communication
- Institutions: Macquarie University
- Thesis: A theoretical study of the evolution of the atmospheres and surface temperatures of the terrestrial planets (1976)

Ann Henderson-Sellers (born 1952) is an Emeritus Professor of the Department of Environment and Geography at Macquarie University, Sydney. She was the Director of the Joint Planning Staff (JPS) of the World Climate Research Programme in 2006 and 2007 and was the Director of the Environment Division at ANSTO from 1998 to 2005. She was the Deputy Vice-Chancellor (Research & Development) of The Royal Melbourne Institute of Technology from 1996–1998. Prior to this she was the founding director of the Climatic Impacts Centre at Macquarie University where she continues to hold a Professorship in Physical Geography.

== Early life and education ==
Ann Henderson-Sellers was born in 1952 in Sheffield, United Kingdom, and from an early age had to fight against cultural norms that girls can't and don't study maths and science. She studied mathematics at the University of Bristol, then completed her PhD in 1976 in collaboration with the Meteorological Office in Britain. During her PhD, she married Brian Henderson-Sellers, a PhD student at the University of Leicester, which caused her funding to get canceled as the assumption was 'if a woman got married she would be fully supported, financially, by her husband'.

== Earth science ==
Henderson-Sellers previously led the WMO Project for Intercomparison of Land-surface Parameterization Schemes, which operates as an international Internet-based "collaboratry". She recently led the Model Evaluation Consortium for Climate Assessment (MECCA) Analysis Team. She also acts as a consultant to the United Nations University on various aspects of the impact of climate. During 1995 she was a convening lead author for the IPCC SAR.

Professor Henderson-Sellers has been an Earth Systems scientist all her life spearheading the description and prediction of the influence of land-cover and land-use change on climate and human systems. She has a BSc in mathematics, undertook her PhD in collaboration with the U.K. Meteorological Office and earned a D.Sc. in climate science in 1999. She is an elected Fellow of Australia's Academy of Technological Sciences and Engineering and was awarded the Centenary Medal of Australia for Service to Australian Society in Meteorology in 2003.

Ann Henderson-Sellers is an ISI "highly cited" author of more than 500 publications, including 14 books, and is an elected Fellow of America's Geophysical Union and the American Meteorological Society.

Her essay "The IPCC Report: What The Lead Authors Really Think" discusses IPCC lead authors' views, especially on the 4th Assessment Report process.

== Works ==
- "A Climate Modelling Primer" (first author Kendal McGuffie, 4th Edition, John Wiley and Sons, 2014).
