= Brian Henderson-Sellers =

Australian computer scientist

Brian Henderson-Sellers (born January 1951) is an English-Australian computer scientist. He is a Professor of Information Systems at the University of Technology Sydney. He is also Director of the Centre for Object Technology and Applications at University of Technology Sydney.

== Education ==
Henderson-Sellers has received a BSc and A.R.C.S. in Mathematics from the Imperial College London in 1972, a MSc from the Reading University in 1973, and a PhD from Leicester University in 1976.

== Career ==
From 1976 to 1983, he was a lecturer in the Department of Civil Engineering at the University of Salford in England and from 1983 at the department of mathematics. In 1988, he emigrated to Australia and became associate professor in the school of Information Systems at the University of New South Wales. In 1990, he founded the Object-Oriented Special Interest Group of the Australian Computer Society. He is co-founder and leader of the international OPEN Consortium. Currently he is professor of Information Systems at the University of Technology Sydney. He is also Director of the Centre for Object Technology and Applications at University of Technology Sydney.

He is also editor of the International Journal of Agent-Oriented Software Engineering and on the editorial board of the Journal of Object Technology and Software and Systems Modelling and was for many years the Regional Editor of Object-Oriented Systems, a member of the editorial board of Object Magazine/Component Strategies and Object Expert. And he is associate editor of the Enterprise Modelling and Information Systems Architectures journal. Also he is a frequent, invited speaker at international OT conferences.

In July 2001, Henderson-Sellers was awarded a Doctor of Science (DSc) from the University of London for his research contributions in object-oriented methodologies.

== Work ==
His research interests are object-oriented analysis and design, object-oriented metrics, agent-oriented methodologies, and the migration of organizations to object technology.

=== Object-oriented Process, Environment and Notation ===
Object-oriented Process, Environment and Notation (OPEN) is a third-generation, public domain, fully object-oriented methodology and process. It encapsulates business issues, quality issues, modelling issues and reuse issues within its end-to-end lifecycle support for software development using the object-oriented paradigm. OPEN provides flexibility. Its metamodel-based framework can be tailored to individual domains or projects taking into account personal skills, organizational culture and requirements peculiar to each industry domain".

== Publications ==
Henderson-Sellers is author of numerous papers including thirty-one books and is well known for his work in object-oriented and agent-oriented software development methodologies and situational method engineering (MOSES, COMMA and OPEN) and in OO metrics. A selection:

- 1992. Book of object-oriented knowledge : object-oriented analysis, design, and implementation : a new approach to software engineering.
- 1994. Booktwo of object-oriented knowledge : the working object : object-oriented software engineering : methods and management. With J.M. Edwards.
- 1996. Object-oriented metrics : measures of complexity
- 1997. OPEN process specification. With Ian Graham and Houman Younessi.
- 1998. OPEN Modeling Language (OML) reference manual. With Donald Firesmith, Ian Graham, foreword by Meilir Page-Jones.
- 1998. Object-oriented metamethods. With A. Bulthuis.
- 1998. OPEN toolbox of techniques. With Anthony Simons and Houman Younessi.
- 2000. Open modeling with UML. With Bhuvan Unhelkar.
- 2005. Agent-oriented methodologies. With Paolo Giorgini (ed)
- 2008. Metamodelling for software engineering. With César González-Pérez.
- 2008. Situational method engineering : fundamentals and experiences. Edited with Jolita Raylte and Sjaak Brinkkemper. New York : Springer, 2008.
- 2012. On the Mathematics of Modelling, Metamodelling, Ontologies and Modelling Languages, Springer, 2012.
