= Milutin Milanković =

Serbian scientist and professor (1879–1958)

- Милутин Миланковић
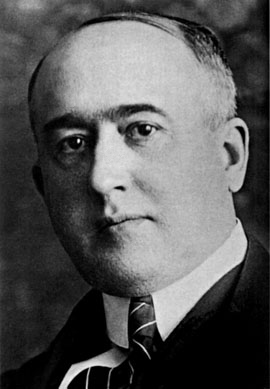
- Milutin Milanković, c. 1924
- Born: 28 May 1879; Dalj, Austria-Hungary (modern day Croatia)
- Died: 12 December 1958 (aged 79); Belgrade, PR Serbia, Yugoslavia (modern day Serbia)
- Education: TU Wien
- Known for: Insolation; Milankovitch cycles
- Scientific career
- Fields: Mathematics; astronomy; astrophysics; climatology; paleoclimatology; geophysics
- Thesis: Beitrag zur Theorie der Druck-kurven (1904)

Signature
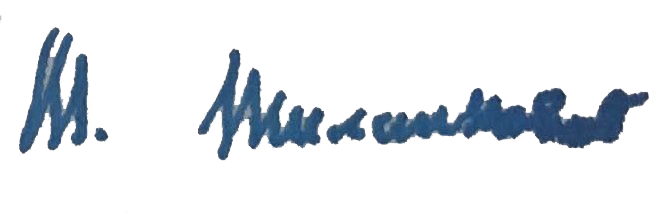

Milutin Milanković (sometimes anglicised as Milutin Milankovitch; Serbian Cyrillic: Милутин Миланковић, pronounced [milǔtin milǎːnkoʋitɕ]; 28 May 1879 – 12 December 1958) was a Serbian mathematician, astronomer, climatologist, geophysicist, civil engineer, university professor, popularizer of science and academic.

Milanković made two fundamental contributions to science: he devised advanced methods to compute slow changes in Earth's orbit that gradually redistribute insolation between the seasons and low- and high-latitude regions (now known as Milankovitch cycles), and he developed a quantitative theory of climate where these insolation cycles were sufficient to cause the recurring ice ages of the Quaternary period. While the Milankovitch cycles in insolation have been confirmed and further substantiated by subsequent research, the classical Milankovitch theory of climate, in its original formulation, provides an incomplete explanation of glacial–interglacial climate dynamics. In particular, it does not fully account for the magnitude and global distribution of glacial cooling, the nonlinear and dynamic behaviour of continental ice sheets, or the complex interactions between orbital forcing, ocean circulation and greenhouse-gas feedbacks that govern the evolution of glacial cycles. Understanding how Milanković orbital forcing governs the timing and pacing of recorded glacial–interglacial climate cycles remains one of the key challenges in paleoclimatology.

Milanković founded planetary climatology by calculating temperatures of the upper layers of the Earth's atmosphere as well as the temperature conditions on planets of the inner Solar System, Mercury, Venus, Mars, and the Moon, as well as the depth of the atmosphere of the outer planets. He demonstrated the interrelatedness of celestial mechanics and the Earth sciences and enabled a consistent transition from celestial mechanics to the Earth sciences and transformation of descriptive sciences into exact ones.

A distinguished professor of applied mathematics and celestial mechanics at the University of Belgrade, Milanković was a director of the Belgrade Observatory, member of the Commission 7 for celestial mechanics of the International Astronomical Union and vice-president of Serbian Academy of Sciences and Arts. Beginning his career as a construction engineer, he retained an interest in construction throughout his life, and worked as a structural engineer and supervisor on a series of reinforced concrete constructions throughout Yugoslavia. He registered multiple patents related to this area.

== Life ==
=== Early life ===
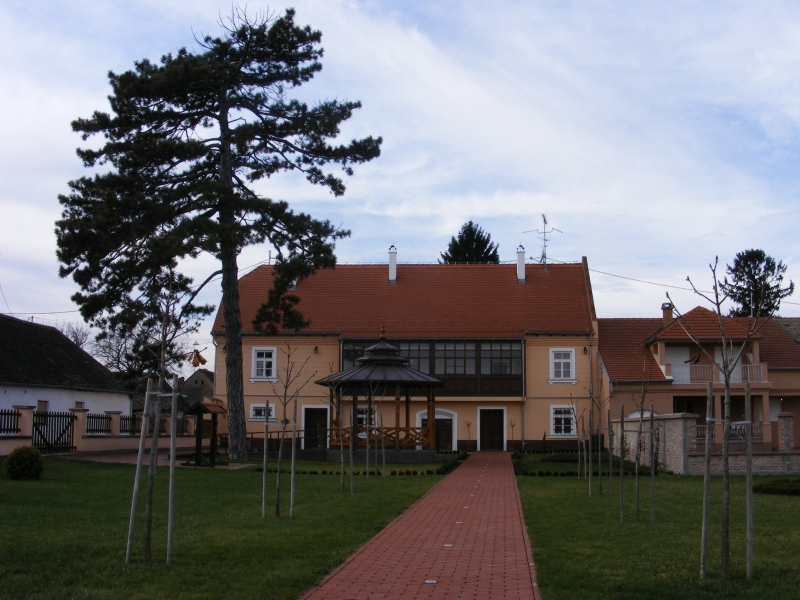
The house in Dalj in which Milanković was born today houses the Cultural and Scientific Center "Milutin Milanković"

Milutin Milanković was born in the village of Dalj, a settlement on the banks of the Danube in what was then part of Austro-Hungarian Empire. Milutin and his twin sister were the oldest of seven children raised in a Serb family. Their father was a merchant, landlord and a local politician who died when Milutin was seven. As a result, Milutin and his siblings were raised by his mother, grandmother, and an uncle. His three brothers died of tuberculosis at a young age. As his health was fickle, Milutin received his elementary education at home, learning from his father Milan, private teachers, and from numerous relatives and friends of the family, some of whom were renowned philosophers, inventors, and poets. He attended secondary school (realgymnasium) in nearby Osijek, completing it in 1896.

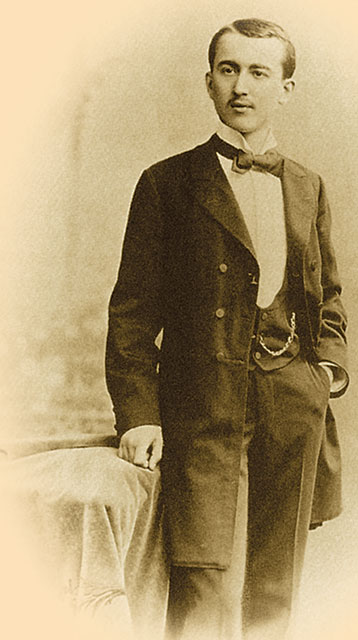
Milanković as a student c. 1900

In 1896, he moved to Vienna to study Civil Engineering at the TU Wien and graduated in 1902. In his third year of studies, Milanković found more free time for wider education. He paid his full attention to the monumental buildings of Vienna, thereby gradually understanding all the beauty of architecture. He also visited Viennese museums and galleries, after which he became an admirer of Raphael's Madonna del Prato. He showed great interest in the Vienna Opera, which he visited regularly. In addition, he devoted his attention to learning the French language by taking private lessons and attending summer French language course in Geneva in 1899. During a stay in Switzerland, Milankovitch visited the Institute for the Testing Building Materials in the Polytechnic in Zurich. In the Viennese ″Café Elisabethbrücke″, which was not fashionable but served only for reading, he spent an hour or two daily reading numerous newspapers and magazines. The professor of the science of the building bridges, Johann Brik, the top expert of Viennese Mechanics of that time, taught the most important subject of the fifth school year. In Brikʼs teaching, young Milankovitch found strong inspiration for later scientific work, as he describe it: ″Brikʼs lectures were very interesting to me. His mastering of mathematical analysis was excellent and would constantly apply it in his lectures. To a good mathematician it gives certain independence and freedom in solving problems.″

After graduating and spending his obligatory year in military service, Milankovitch borrowed money from an uncle to pay for additional schooling at TU Wien in engineering. At age twenty-five, his PhD thesis was entitled Contribution to the Theory of Pressure Curves (Beitrag zur Theorie der Druckkurven) and its implementation allowed assessment of pressure curves' shape and properties when continuous pressure is applied, which is very useful in bridge, cupola and abutment construction. His thesis was successfully defended on 3 December 1904; examination committee members were Johann Emanuel Brik, Josef Finger, Emanuel Czuber and Ludwig von Tetmajer. He then worked for an engineering firm in Vienna, using his knowledge to design structures.

=== Middle years ===
==== Structural engineering ====
At the beginning of 1905, Milanković took up practical work and joined the firm of Adolf Baron Pittel Betonbau-Unternehmung in Vienna. He built dams, bridges, viaducts, aqueducts, and other structures in reinforced concrete throughout Austria-Hungary. So Milankovitch verified his theoretical knowledge and design tools on numerous reinforced concrete structures that he built during his engineering service in Vienna. Milankovitch participated with structural calculations and practical work in the construction of a total of ten hydroelectric power plants. Among them, the most notable is the one built in Sebeș (present-day Romania) in the Transylvania region. Milankovitch's specific task was to design a reinforced concrete aqueduct 1200 m long, which would bring water above the turbines of the city's hydroelectric power plant. After that, he was engaged in the construction of the viaduct in Hirschwang (Semmering) in 1906 and in Pitten near Vienna in 1907.

He also participated in the construction of bridges in Krainburg, Banhilda and Bad Ischl, then the Belgrade and Košice sewage system, and Krupp's metal factory in Berndorf. The bridge in Krainburg (130 meters long and seven meters wide) was particularly beautiful, set on three pillars with four arches each, 30 meters apart. It was built of reinforced concrete, but was later destroyed during World War II.

Milankovitch′s original solution of ideal water reservoir 1908.

Milankovitch's great reputation was certainly contributed to by inventions of a new technology of building reinforced concrete ceiling, under the name "System Milankovitch - Kreutz", with which he became famous throughout the Austria-Hungary. He developed and patented the mentioned system of building ceilings with Theodor Kreutz. Compared to the existing ones, this ceiling stood out due to its simpler design, lower consumption of materials and the fact that it had integrated thermal and sound insulation, which made it more aesthetically elegant. The "Milankovitch - Kreutz" construction system was protected by four patents for three inventions.

In 1908, Milankovitch invented and patented new and useful Improvement in the Production of hollow reinforced-concrete slabs AT 42720 B. This patent is the equivalent of Milanovitch's US patent US 940041 A.

In 1905, he published the first paper on armored concrete named Contribution to the theory of reinforced armored pillars. He published the second paper on the same subject based on new results in 1906. In 1908, he published a paper titled "On membranes of same opposition" in which he proves that the ideal shape for a water reservoir of equally thick walls is that of a drop of water. His six patents were officially recognized and his reputation in the profession was enormous, bringing abundant financial wealth.

The second phase of the construction of the ′Milankovitch′s bridge′ with a reinforced concrete arch in the Kingdom of Serbia in 1912.

In 1908, the Austro-Hungarian Empire decided to annex Bosnia and Herzegovina after 30 years of occupation. This was the height of a crisis with the neighboring Kingdom of Serbia, which did not agree with this act. And, there was even a growing danger of war and invasion.

Milanković continued to practice civil engineering in Vienna until 1 October 1909 when he received an offer from the University of Belgrade to work as an associate professor at the Department of Applied Mathematics that comprised three basic branches: rational, celestial mechanics, and theoretical physics. Though he continued to pursue his investigations of various problems pertaining to the application of reinforced concrete, he decided to concentrate on fundamental research.

Although this was the turning point in Milankovitch's career, he still does not abandon his "passion for the entire range of construction work, from theoretical ideas to craftsmanship", and continues to engage in design and construction, in parallel with his scientific work. Thus, after arriving in the Kingdom of Serbia, Milanković accepted the design and construction of the first reinforced concrete bridges on the Niš - Knjaževac railway, in the Timok Valley through the Nisevac Gorg, at the request of his friend and collegemate from TU Wien and civil engineer Petar Putnik. This undertaking was unique in that, at the suggestion of engineer Putnik, the type construction of a reinforced concrete bridge was applied for the first time in Serbia. The project of the 30-meter-span bridge, which rests on rocky shores, was done by Milanković with the aim of easier and faster construction of the railway on the route of which the construction of 19 bridges was planned. Thanks to this simple approach, the construction of all 19 bridges is solved with one project. That is precisely why Putnik's construction company won this job at the public procurement in 1912, when construction began. Milanković participated in the construction of the first of the nineteen bridges, which was located near Svrljig, where he fully immersed himself in the work and took care of how "the concrete is mixed, distributed over the formwork and compacted". Meanwhile, Milankovitch was granted citizenship of the Kingdom of Serbia in 1910.

==== Planet's insolation ====
His first papers were in the field of celestial mechanics, Properties of motion in a specialized three-body problem (1910), On general integrals of the n-body problem (1911), On kinematic symmetry and its application to qualitative solutions of dynamics problem (1912), but from 1912 Milankovitch began to be interested in cosmic climatology or solar climate. He began working on it in 1912, after he had realized that "most of meteorology is nothing but a collection of innumerable empirical findings, mainly numerical data, with traces of physics used to explain some of them... Mathematics was even less applied, nothing more than elementary calculus... Advanced mathematics had no role in that science..."

While studying the works of the contemporaneous climatologist Julius von Hann, Milanković noticed a significant issue, which became one of the major objects of his scientific research: ice ages. The possibility of astronomically-forced climate changes was first considered in the 19th century, by astronomers such as John Herschel and geologists like Louis Agassiz. Milanković studied the works of Joseph Adhemar, whose pioneering theory on the astronomical origins of ice ages were formally rejected by his contemporaries, as well as the janitor-turned-scientist, James Croll, whose work was effectively forgotten after an initial acceptance by contemporaries such as Charles Darwin. Despite having valuable data on the distribution of ice on the Alps across various glaciations, climatologists and geologists had failed to establish a root causes of these cycles. Milanković decided to attempt a calculation of the magnitude of astronomical influences on Earth's overall climate. Milanković sought a solution for these complex problems in the field of spherical geometry, celestial mechanics, and theoretical physics.

His first work described the present climate on Earth and how the Sun's rays determine the temperature on Earth's surface after passing through the atmosphere. He published the first paper on the subject entitled "Contribution to the mathematical theory of climate" in Belgrade in April 1912. His next paper was entitled "Distribution of the sun radiation on the earth's surface" and was published in June 1913. In December of that year, this paper was read by Wilhelm Wien, and was soon published in the German journal Annalen der Physik. He correctly calculated the intensity of insolation and developed a mathematical theory describing Earth's climate zones. His aim was an integral, mathematically accurate theory which connects thermal regimes of the planets to their movement around the Sun. He wrote: "...such a theory would enable us to go beyond the range of direct observations, not only in space, but also in time... It would allow reconstruction of the Earth's climate, and also its predictions, as well as give us the first reliable data about the climate conditions on other planets."

He published a paper entitled "The problem of the astronomical theory of ice ages" in 1914. Milankovitch married Kristina Topuzović, an amateur opera singer, on 14 June 1914. They decided to go on their honeymoon to Switzerland, but before that they stopped in Milankovitch's native village of Dalj in Austria-Hungary, where they heard that Franz Ferdinand had been assassinated in Sarajevo which was the cause of the July crisis. Meanwhile, the Austro-Hungarian Empire began massing troops in the Balkans near the border with the Kingdom of Serbia in preparation for an invasion. Milankovitch was soon arrested by the Austro-Hungarian authorities because he was a reserve officer in the Royal Serbian Army and at first he spent six weeks under house arrest, but was eventually imprisoned and later sent to a prisoner-of-war camp (K. u. K. Interienirungslager) in Nezsider, Hungary (today Neusiedl am See, Austria). He described his first day in prison, where he waited to be taken to the Esseg fortress as a prisoner of war, in the following words:

... Sat on the bed, I looked around and started synchronizing with my new social position .... In the suitcase I had my printed works and my notes on the cosmic problem, there was clean paper too and I started writing. It was far past midnight when I stopped. I looked around the room, wondering where I was. It felt like I was in a roadhouse on my trip through the Universe.

Théorie mathématique des phénomènes thermiques produits par la radiation solaire.

His wife went to Vienna to talk to Emanuel Czuber, who was his mentor and a good friend. Through his social connections, Professor Czuber arranged Milanković's release from prison and permission to spend his captivity in Budapest with the right to work. After six months spent in the prison camp, Milanković was released on 24 December 1914. Immediately after arriving in Budapest, Milanković met the Director of the Library of the Hungarian Academy of Science, Kálmán Szily who, as a mathematician, eagerly accepted Milanković and enabled him to work undisturbed in the Academy's library and the Central Meteorological Institute. Milanković spent four years in Budapest, almost the entire war. He was not allowed to leave town, and had to report to the police office once a week. In 1915, Milanković's son Vasilije-Vasko was born in Budapest. He used mathematical methods to study the current climate of inner planets of the solar system.

He shared the general opinion at the time that Mars and Venus contained water on their surface. This was logical thinking, since Earth has water, Mars has a polar cap, and Venus has white clouds that associate on the water vapor. This significantly influenced his calculations for the basic thermal climate characteristics of these two planets. In 1916 he published a paper entitled "Investigation of the climate of the planet Mars". He knew the size of Mars and its distance from the Sun, but also that it has a similar rotation speed and axis orientation as Earth. Milanković calculated that the average temperature in the lower layers the atmosphere on Mars is −45 °C (−49 °F) and the average surface temperature is −17 °C (1 °F). Also, he concluded that: "This large temperature difference between the ground and lower layers of the atmosphere is not unexpected. Great transparency for solar radiation makes that is the climate of Mars very similar to altitudes climate of our Earth." In any case, Milanković's work suggested that Mars has a harsh climate, and calmed mounting enthusiasm concerning the prospect of discovering the presence of liquid water on the surface of Mars. He discussed the possibility of life on Mars and was skeptical that it could have complex life forms as well and vegetation. In addition to considering Mars, he dealt with the climatic conditions prevailing on Venus and Mercury.

According to his own words, Milankovitch did not know the speed of rotation of Venus, the orientation of the axis, as well as the thickness and composition of the atmosphere. He was aware of Schiaparelli's suggestion that Venus has a slow rotation period equal to the duration of its orbits around the Sun, but he was skeptical because he thought that Venus would lose its atmosphere during a long-term day due to the effects of solar radiation. At the last, he accepted spectroscopy observations from that time that suggested a shorter rotation period similar to Earth's. So he considered a greenhouse effect (water vapor) on Venus calculated the temperature in the outer limit of the atmosphere +25 °C (77 °F), the upper layer +54 °C (129 °F), the middle layer +70 °C (158 °F) and the lower layer of the atmosphere +80 °C (176 °F) as well as a ground temperature of +97 °C (207 °F). In his literary work Through Distant Worlds and Times, he described of Venus in the following words:

Here we are in the temple of Isis and Osiris, more magnificent than Schinkel himself imagined. From its huge dome, covered with a gently mother-of-pearl mosaic, a white mysterious light spills over the interior of this home. That dome, that's the sky of Venus. The Sun is never visible on it, only the Sun's silvery glow. Not a single star twinkles in this sky; no messenger of the universe reaches this sanctuary...What is this? A storm is raging in my head, blood vessels are beating like sledgehammers, I'm out of breath. You are pale, dear miss, your legs are wobbly - you have completely fainted... Half unconscious, I carry you, in my arms, to our Earth...

He also discussed the possibility of life on Venus. He thought that the mystery of this planet lies in the answer to the question about its axis, the speed of rotation or how long a day lasts on Venus.

His calculations of the surface temperature conditions on the neighboring Moon are particularly significant. Milankovitch knew that the moon rotates on its axis in 27.32 days, so lunar daytime on one side of the moon last about 13.5 Earth days. Milankovitch calculated that the temperature after a long moon night, in the early morning on the Moon, or before the rise of the Sun over horizon, was −53.8 °C (−64.8 °F). At noon, it rises on +97 °C (207 °F), only to reach its maximum value one Earth day later +100.5 °C (212.9 °F). At sunset, the temperature drops −8.8 °C (16.2 °F). According to Milankovitch, a sudden cooling occurs during the night.

From 1912 to 1917, he wrote and published seven papers on mathematical theories of climate both on the Earth and on the other planets. He formulated a precise, numerical climatological model with the capacity for reconstruction of the past and prediction of the future, and established the astronomical theory of climate as a generalized mathematical theory of insolation. When these most important problems of the theory were solved, and a firm foundation for further work built, Milanković finished the manuscript under the title Mathematische Grundlagen der kosmischen Strahlungslehre that he sent to his Professor Czuber in Vienna at the summer of 1917. Czuber contacted a publishing house in Leipzig, but since there was a shortage of paper in early 1918, the printing of the book was cancelled. In the fall of 1917, Milankovitch got a job in a construction bureau in Budapest, where he worked on detailed projects of reinforced concrete constructions of a new six-story tuberculosis sanatorium built in the High Tatras, as well as on other important projects.

After the Great War, the Austro-Hungarian Empire disintegrated and new states such as the Kingdom of Serbs, Croats and Slovenes, Republic of Austria, Kingdom of Hungary and Czechoslovak Republic were formed on its remains. Milanković returned from Budapest to Belgrade with his family after a three-day trip by steamboat ″Gizella″ on 19 March 1919. He continued his professorial career, becoming a full professor at the University of Belgrade. Milanković then, with the help of Professor Ivan Đaja, prepared the French text of this work and it was published under the title "Théorie mathématique des phénomènes thermiques produits par la radiation solaire" (Mathematical Theory of Heat Phenomena Produced by Solar Radiation) in 1920 in the edition of the Yugoslav Academy of Sciences and Arts (today HAZU) from Zagreb and the Gauthier-Villars in Paris. That same year, he was elected a corresponding member of the Serbian Royal Academy of Sciences in Belgrade and the Yugoslav Academy of Science and Arts in Zagreb.

==== Orbital variations and ice ages ====
As a consequence of the Russian Civil War, with the arrival of Russian scientists – emigrants, the personnel base of the Faculty of Philosophy at the University of Belgrade was expanded. Thus, from 1920 Anton Bilimovich (1879–1970), a distinguished scientist, who came from Odessa, took over the lectures on rational mechanics, and from 1925 the lectures on theoretical physics and vector theory were taken over by the newly elected assistant professor Wenceslas S. Jardetzky (1896–1962). Between the two wars, Milankovitch taught celestial mechanics and occasionally the theory of relativity, and after the Second World War until 1955, when he retired, he taught celestial mechanics and the history of astronomy.

Milankovitch's works on astronomical explanations of ice ages, especially his curve of insolation for the past 130,000 years, received support from the climatologist Wladimir Köppen and from the geophysicist Alfred Wegener. Köppen noted the usefulness of Milanković's theory for paleoclimatological researchers. Milanković received a letter on 22 September 1922 from Köppen, who asked him to expand his studies from 130,000 years to 600,000 years. He accepted Köppen's suggestion that cool summers were a crucial factor for glaciation and agreed to calculate the secular progress of insolation of the Earth at the outer limit of the atmosphere for the past 650,000 years for parallels of 55°, 60° and 65° northern latitude, where the most important events of the Quaternary glaciations occurred. After developing the mathematical machinery enabling him to calculate the insolation in any given geographical latitude and for any annual season, Milanković was ready to start the realization of the mathematical description of climate of the Earth in the past. Milanković spent 100 days doing the calculations and prepared a graph of solar radiation changes at geographical latitudes of 55°, 60° and 65° north for the past 650,000 years. Milankovitch, in his early works, used the astronomical values of Stockwell-Pilgram.

These curves showed the variations in insolation which correlated with four Alpine glaciations known at the time (Gunz, Mindel, Riss and Würm glaciation). Köppen felt that Milanković's theoretical approach to solar energy was a logical approach to the problem. His solar curve was introduced in a work entitled "Climates of the geological past", published by Wladimir Köppen and his son-in-law Alfred Wegener in 1924. In September of that year, he attended the lecture given by Alfred Wegener at Congress of German Naturalist in Innsbruck. That same year, he was elected a full member of the Serbian Royal Academy of Sciences. The Meteorological service of the Kingdom of Yugoslavia became a member of International Meteorological Organization – IMO (founded in Brussels in 1853 and in Vienna in 1873) as a predecessor of present World Meteorological Organization, WMO. Milanković served as a representative of the Kingdom of Yugoslavia there for many years.

Mathematician's Club in Belgrade 1926 (From left to right sitting: N. Saltikov, M. Petrović, P. Popović, B. Gavrilović, V. Petković and M. Milanković. Standing: Dr. M. Radojčić, T. Pejović, W. Jardetzky, A. Bilimović, P. Zajončkovski, J. Mihailović, R. Kašanin and J. Karamata)

Milanković put the Sun at the center of his theory, as the only source of heat and light in the Solar System. He considered three cyclical movements of the Earth: eccentricity, axial tilt, and precession. Each cycle works on a different time-scale and each affects the amount of solar energy received by the planets. Such changes in the geometry of an orbit lead to the changes in the insolation – the quantity of heat received by any spot at the surface of a planet. These orbital variations, which are influenced by gravity of the Moon, Sun, Jupiter, and Saturn, form the basis of the Milankovitch cycle.

Between 1925 and 1928 Milanković wrote the popular-science book Through Distant Worlds and Times in the form of letters to an anonymous woman. The work discusses the history of astronomy, climatology and science via a series of imaginary visits to various points in space and time by the author and his unnamed companion, encompassing the formation of the Earth, past civilizations, famous ancient and renaissance thinkers and their achievements, and the work of his contemporaries, Köppen and Wegener. In the "letters", Milanković expanded on some of his own theories on astronomy and climatology, and described the complicated problems of celestial mechanics in a simplified manner.

Köppen proposed to Milanković on 14 December 1926 to extend his calculations to a million years and to send his results to Barthel Eberl, a geologist studying the Danube basin, as Eberl's research had unearthed some evidence of previous Ice Ages from before over 650,000 years ago. Eberl published all this in Augsburg in 1930 together with Milanković's curves. In 1927, Milanković received an offer from Köppen to collaborate on the Handbook of Climatology (Handbuch der Klimatologie), which was edited by Köppen himself. That same year, Milanković asked his colleague and friend, Vojislav Mišković, to collaborate in the work and calculate astronomical values based on the Le Verrier method. Mišković was a well-established astronomer from the Nice Observatory, who became the head of the Astronomical Observatory of the University of Belgrade and a professor of Theoretical and Practical Astronomy. After almost three years, Mišković and his staff completed the calculation of astronomical values based on the Le Verrier method and using the masses of the planets as known at that time. Milanković used these values in his later works. Subsequently, Milanković wrote the introductory portion of Mathematical science of climate and astronomical theory of the variations of the climate (Mathematische Klimalehre und Astronomische Theorie der Klimaschwankungen), published by Köppen (Handbook of Climatology; Handbuch der Klimalogie Band 1) in 1930 in German and translated into Russian in 1939.

In 1935 Milanković published the book Celestial Mechanics. This textbook used vector calculus systematically to solve problems of celestial mechanics. His original contribution to celestial mechanics is called Milanković's system of vector elements of planetary orbits. He reduced six Lagrangean-Laplacian elliptical elements to two vectors determining the mechanics of planetary movements. The first specifies the planet's orbital plane, the sense of revolution of the planet, and the orbital ellipse parameter; the second specifies the axis of the orbit in its plane and the orbital eccentricity. By applying those vectors he significantly simplified the calculation and directly obtained all the formulas of the classical theory of secular perturbations. Milanković, in a simple but original manner, first deduced Newton's law of gravitation from Kepler's laws. Then Milanković treated the two-body and the many-body problems of celestial mechanics.

He applied vector calculus from quantum mechanics to celestial mechanics.

Meanwhile, in 1936 he attended the Third symposium of the International Union for Quaternary Research (INQUA) in Vienna.

In the period from 1935 to 1938 Milanković calculated that ice cover depended on changes in insolation. He succeeded in defining the mathematical relationship between summer insolation and the altitude of the snow line. In this way he defined the increase of snow which would occur as a consequence of any given change in summer insolation. He published his results in the study "New Results of the Astronomic Theory of Climate Changes" in 1938. Geologists received a graph presenting bordering altitudes of ice cover for any period of time during the last 600,000 years. .

==== Polar wandering ====
Conversations with Wegener, the father of continental drift theory, got Milanković interested in the interior of the Earth and the movement of the poles, so he told his friend that he would investigate polar wandering. In November 1929, Milanković received an invitation from Professor Beno Gutenberg of Darmstadt to collaborate on a ten volume handbook on geophysics and to publish his views on the problem of the secular variations of the Earth's rotational poles. In the meantime, Wegener died in November 1930 during his fourth expedition to Greenland. Milanković became convinced that the continents 'float' on a somewhat fluid subsurface and that the positions of the continents with respect to the axis of rotation affect the centrifugal force of the rotation and can throw the axis off balance and force it to move. Wegener's tragedy additionally motivated Milanković to persevere in solving the problem of polar wandering.

Milanković began working on the problem of the shape of the Earth and the position of the Earth's poles in 1932 and 1933 at the suggestion of Alfred Wegener. The Earth as a whole he considered as a fluid body, which in the case of short-duration forces behaves as a solid body, but under an influence behaves as an elastic body. Using vector analysis he made a mathematical model of the Earth to create a theory of secular motion of the terrestrial poles. He derived the equation of secular trajectory of a terrestrial pole and also the equation of pole motion along this trajectory. His equation, also known as Milankovitch's theorem, is v = c grad Ω.

He drew a map of the path of the poles over the past 300 million years and stated that changes happen in the interval of 5 million years (minimum) to 30 million years (maximum). He found that the secular pole trajectory depends only on the configuration of the terrestrial outer shell and the instantaneous pole position on it, more precisely on geometry of the Earth mass. On this basis he could calculate the secular pole trajectory. Also, based on Milanković's model, the continental blocks sink into their underlying "fluidal" base, and slide around, 'aiming to achieve' isostatic equilibrium. In his conclusion about this problem, he wrote: For an extraterrestrial observer, the displacement of the pole takes place in such a way that the ... Earth's axis maintains its orientation in space, but the Earth's crust is displaced on its substratum. Milankovitch published his paper on the subject entitled "Numerical trajectory of secular changes of pole's rotation" in Belgrade in 1932.

Milanković wrote four sections of Gutenberg's "Handbook of Geophysics" (Handbuch der Geophysik):

- Stellung und Bewegung der Erde im Weltall, No I,2 - 1931, (The Earth's Position and Movement in Space)
- Drehbewegungen der Erde, No. I,6 - 1933, (Rotational Movement of the Earth)
- Säkulare Polverlagerungen, No. I,7 - 1933, (Secular shift of the Poles)
- Astronomiche Mittel zur Erforschung der erdgeschichtlichen Klimate, No. IX, 7 - 1938, (Astronomic Means for Climate Study during the Earth's history)

The lecture on the apparent shift of poles was held at a congress of Balkan mathematicians in Athens in 1934. That same year, held a lecture dedicated to the work of Alfred Wegener under the title Moving of the Earth's Poles – A Memory to Alfred Wegener in Belgrade, which was also published under the same name. Wegener's untimely death ended the collaboration between them on this subject.

Milankovitch's work on this topic was criticized from the beginning. Milankovitch's trajectory of polar wandering was a topic of discussion after World War II. In the 1950s, paleomagnetic data showed different results than Milankovitch's theoretical numerical values for polar wandering trajectory.

=== Later life ===
To collect his scientific work on the theory of solar radiation that was scattered in many books and papers, Milanković began his life's work in 1939. This tome was entitled "Canon of Insolation of the Earth and Its Application to the Problem of the Ice Ages", which covered his nearly three decades of research, including a large number of formulas, calculations and schemes, but also summarized universal laws through which it was possible to explain cyclical climate change – his namesake Milankovitch cycles.

Milanković spent two years arranging and writing the "Canon". The manuscript was submitted to print on 2 April 1941 – four days before the attack of Nazi Germany and its allies on the Kingdom of Yugoslavia. In the bombing of Belgrade on 6 April 1941, the printing house where his work was being printed was destroyed; however, almost all of the printed sheet paper remained undamaged in the printing warehouse. After the successful occupation of Serbia on 15 May 1941, two German officers and geology students came to Milanković in his house and brought greetings from Professor Wolfgang Soergel of Freiburg. Milanković gave them the only complete printed copy of the "Canon" to send to Soergel, to make certain that his work would be preserved. Milanković did not take part in the work of the university during the occupation, and after the war he was reinstated as professor.

The "Canon" was issued in 1941 by the Royal Serbian Academy, 626 pages in quarto, and was printed in German as "Kanon der Erdbestrahlung und seine Anwendung auf das Eiszeitenproblem". The titles of the six parts of the book are:

1. "The planets' motion around the Sun and their mutual perturbations"
2. "The rotation of the Earth"
3. "Secular wanderings of the rotational poles of the Earth"
4. "The Earth's insolation and its secular changes"
5. "The connection between insolation and the temperature of the Earth and its atmosphere. The mathematical climate of the Earth"
6. "The ice age, its mechanism, structure and chronology".

During the German occupation of Serbia from 1941 to 1944, Milanković withdrew from public life and decided to write a "history of his life and work" going beyond scientific matters, including his personal life and the love of his father who died in his youth. His autobiography would be published after the war, entitled "Recollection, Experiences and Vision" in Belgrade in 1952.

==== Tower of Babel ====
After the war, in 1947, Milanković's only son emigrated from the new communist Yugoslavia via Paris, London and Egypt to Australia. Milanković would never see his son again and the only way of correspondence between them would be through letters. Milanković was vice president of the Serbian Academy of Sciences (1948–1958). In 1948, the General Assembly of the International Astronomical Union was held in Zürich. Milanković is listed as a member of Commission 7 for Celestial Mechanics, and "V. Mishkovitch" as member of Commission 19 for Latitude Variation and Commission 20 for Minor Planets. For a short period, he was the head of the Belgrade Observatory (1948 - 1951). At that time, the Cold War between nuclear powers began. In 1953, he was at the Congress of the International Union for Quaternary Research (INQUA) held in Rome where he was interrupted during his speech by numerous opponents since radiocarbon dating at that time showed different results than his theory. In the same year, he became a member of the Italian Institute of Paleontology. In November 1954, fifty years after receiving his original diploma, he received the Golden Doctor's diploma from the Technical University of Vienna. In 1955, he was also elected as a corresponding member to the Academy of Naturalists "Leopoldina" in Halle, Saxony-Anhalt, East Germany.

At the same time, Milanković began publishing numerous books and textbooks on the history of science, including Isaac Newton and Newton's Principia (1946), The founders of the natural science Pythagoras – Democritus – Aristotle – Archimedes (1947), History of astronomy – from its beginnings up to 1727 (1948), Through empire of science – images from the lives of great scientists (1950), Twenty-two centuries of Chemistry (1953), and Technology in Ancient times (1955).

In 1955, Milanković retired from the position of professor of celestial mechanics and the history of astronomy at the University of Belgrade. In the same year, he published his last work, which is not from the natural sciences, but from his original profession of structural engineering. The paper was titled The Tower of Babel of modern technology. Milanković in this work calculated the highest building possible on our Earth. He was inspired by work of Pieter Bruegel the Elder's Tower of Babel (older version in Vienna). The building would have a base radius of 112.84 km and a height of 21646 m. Since the building penetrates the Earth 1.4 km, it would have a height of 20.25 km above the Earth's surface. At the very top, there would be a wide platform for a meteorological and astronomical station.

In September 1957, Milanković suffered a stroke and died in Belgrade in 1958. He is buried in his family cemetery in Dalj.

== On the speed of light ==
Milanković authored two papers on relativity. He wrote his first paper "On the theory of Michelson's experiment" in 1924. He was doing research in this theory from 1912. His papers on this matter were on special relativity and both are on the Michelson experiment (now known as the Michelson–Morley experiment) which produced strong evidence against aether theory. In the light of the Michelson experiment he discussed on the validity of the second postulate of special theory of relativity, that the speed of light is the same in every reference frame.

== Revised Julian calendar ==
Milanković proposed a revised Julian calendar in 1923. It made centennial years leap years if division by 900 left a remainder of 200 or 600, unlike the Gregorian rule which required that division by 400 left no remainder. (In both systems, the years 2000 and 2400 are leap years.) In May 1923 a congress of some Eastern Orthodox churches adopted the calendar; however, only the removal of 1–13 October 1923 and the revised leap year algorithm were adopted by a number of Eastern Orthodox churches. The dates of Easter and related holy days are still computed using the Julian calendar. At the time of Milanković's proposal, it was suspected the period of rotation of Earth might not be constant, but it was not until the development of quartz and atomic clocks beginning in the 1930s that this could be proven and quantified. The variation in the period of rotation of Earth is the chief cause of long-term inaccuracy in both the Gregorian and Revised Julian calendars.

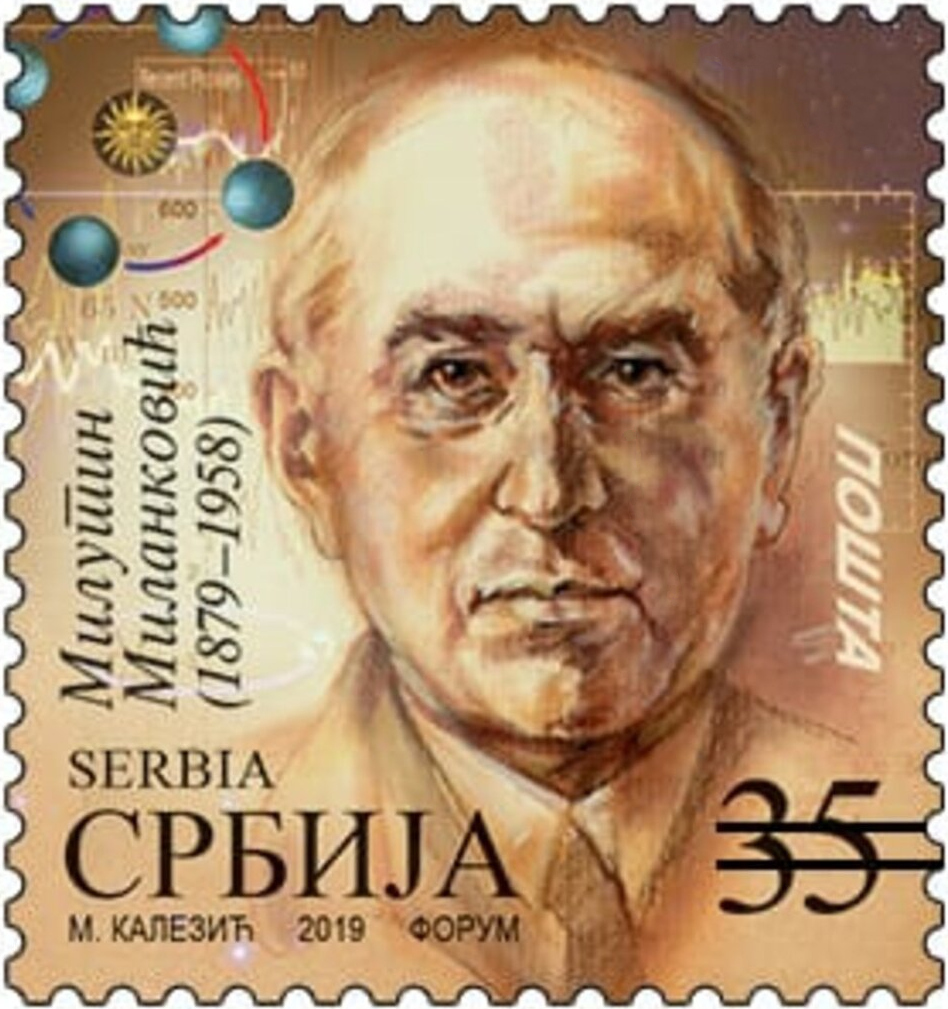
Milanković on a 2019 stamp of Serbia.

== Awards and honors ==
On 25 June 1923 he was conferred the Saint Sava Order, 3rd degree. In 1925, he was awarded Tunisian Nichan Iftikhar Order, 3rd degree. In 1929, he was awarded, at the proposal of the Ministry of Finances the White Eagle Order, 5th degree. In 1935, he was awarded Greek decoration - Phoenix Battalion Commander's Cross. On 20 December 1938 he was awarded the Royal Order of the Yugoslav Crown 3rd degree.

In 1965, the Academy of Sciences of the Soviet Union named an impact crater on the far side of the Moon as Milankovic, which was later confirmed at the 14th IAU General Assembly in 1970. His name is also given to a crater on Mars at the 15th IAU General Assembly in 1973.

Since 1993 the Milutin Milankovic Medal has been awarded by the European Geophysical Society (called the EGU since 2003) for contributions in the area of long-term climate and modeling.

A main belt asteroid discovered in 1936 has also been dubbed 1605 Milankovitch. At NASA, in their edition of "On the Shoulders of Giants", Milanković has been ranked among the top fifteen minds of all time in the field of earth sciences.

== Personal life ==
Milankovitch was a materialistic monist and determinist, according to whom nature is "unique", "boundless, eternal mother of life" and in "the boundless universe, which has no beginning or end in space and time, the same natural laws rule" as on Earth. As a materialist, Milankovitch stood on the position that the universe is eternal, uncreated and indestructible and that the question of its beginning has no meaning.

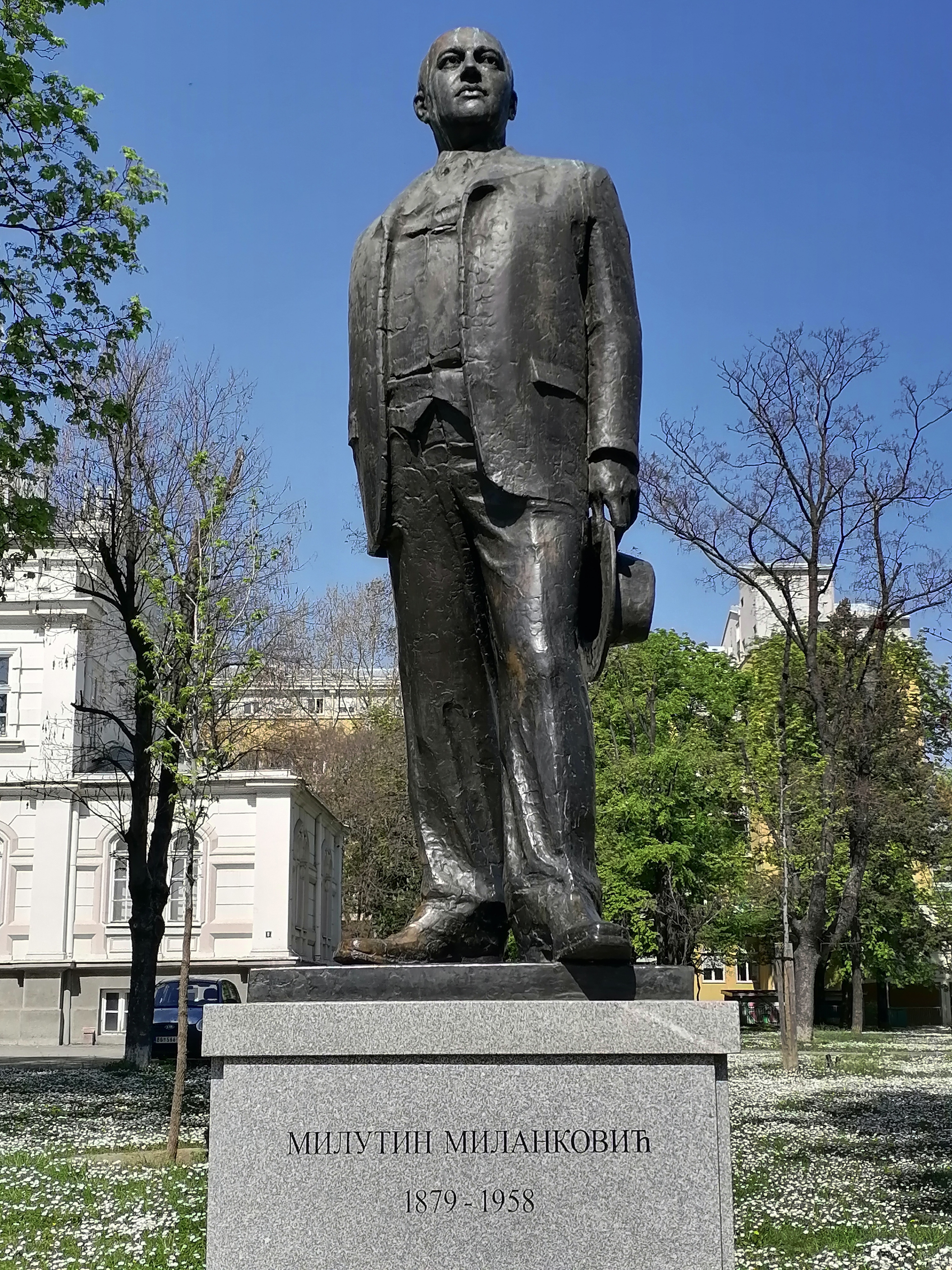
Monument to Milanković in Belgrade.

Milanković was a great admirer of Nikola Tesla. On behalf of five academics, Milutin Milanković wrote a recommendation that Nikola Tesla be elected a full member of the Royal Serbian Academy, which was done at a ceremonial meeting on 7 March 1937.

== Selected works ==
- Théorie mathématique des phénomènes thermiques produits par la radiation solaire, XVI, 338 S. – Paris: Gauthier-Villars, 1920
- Kroz vasionu i vekove. Novi Sad: Matica srpska, 1928
- Reforma julijanskog kalendara. Srpska Kr. Akad. Pos. Izda’na 47: 52 S., Beograd: Sv. Sava, 1923
- Mathematische Klimalehre und astronomische Theorie der Klimaschwankungen. In: Köppen, W.; Geiger R. (Hrsg.): Handbuch der Klimatologie, Bd. 1: Allgemeine Klimalehre, Berlin: Borntraeger, 1930
- Mathematische Klimalehre. In: Gutenberg, B. (Hrsg.) Handbuch der Geophysik, Berlin: Borntraeger, 1933
- Durch ferne Welten und Zeiten, Briefe eines Weltallbummlers. 389 S. – Leipzig: Koehler & Amelang, 1936
- Kanon der Erdbestrahlung und seine Anwendung auf das Eiszeitenproblem. Académie royale serbe. Éditions speciales; 132 [vielm. 133]: XX, 633, Belgrad, 1941
- Canon of insolation and the ice-age problem. English translation by the Israel Program for Scientific Translations, published for the U.S. Department of Commerce and National Science Foundation, Washington, D.C.: 633 S., 1969
- Canon of Insolation and the Ice-Age Problem. Pantic, N. (Hrsg.), Beograd: Zavod Nastavna Sredstva, 634 S., 1998

== See also ==
- History of climate change science

Academic offices
Preceded by Vladimir K. Petković	Dean of the Faculty of Philosophy; 1926–1927	Succeeded by Miloš Trivunac
