= Joseph Adhémar =

French mathematician

Joseph Adhemar
- Born: February 1797; Paris, France
- Died: 1862 (aged 64–65); Paris, France
- Scientific career
- Fields: Mathematics

Joseph Alphonse Adhémar (1797–1862) was a French mathematician. He was the first to suggest that ice ages were controlled by astronomical forces in his 1842 book Revolutions of the Sea.

The Earth's orbit is elliptical, with the Sun at one focus; lines drawn through the summer and winter solstice; and the spring and autumn equinox; intersect with the Sun at right angles. The Earth is closest to the Sun (perihelion) near the Northern Hemisphere winter solstice. The Earth moves faster through its orbit when closer to the Sun. Hence, the period from the Northern Hemisphere's autumn equinox to winter and spring is shorter by around seven days than the period from spring to summer to autumn; the reverse is true in the Southern Hemisphere. Hence, Northern Hemisphere winter is shorter.

Because of this, Adhemar reasoned that because the Southern Hemisphere had more hours of darkness in winter, it must be cooling, and attributed the Antarctic ice sheet to this. Adhemar knew of the 22,000 year cycle of precession of the equinoxes, and theorised that the ice ages occurred in this cycle.

One immediate objection to the theory was that the total insolation during a year does not vary at all during the precessional cycle, only its seasonal distribution. Another was that the timing was wrong; however this could not be tested by observations available at the time.

Adhemar's theory was further developed, first by James Croll and later by Milutin Milanković.

Adhemar predicted the Antarctic ice sheet and theorised about its thickness by comparing the depths of the Arctic and circum-Antarctic oceans. Finding the Antarctic oceans deeper (the measurements he used may not have been fully representative) and attributing this to the gravitational attraction of the Antarctic ice sheet, he postulated a truly enormous ice sheet approximately 90 km thick.
