= Emanuel Czuber =

Austrian mathematician (1851–1925)

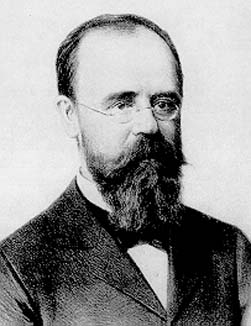
- Portrait of the Austrian mathematician Emanuel Czuber (1851-1925)
- Born: 19 January 1851; Prague, Bohemia-Moravia
- Died: 22 August 1925 (aged 74); Gnigl, near Salzburg, Austria
- Education: Czech Technical University in Prague
- Scientific career
- Fields: Mathematics
- Workplaces: German Technical University in Brno; College of Technology

Emanuel Czuber (Prague, 19 January 1851 – Gnigl, 22 August 1925) was an Austrian mathematician.

== Biography ==
He graduated from a German secondary school (Realschule) in 1869 and continued his studies at the German Technical University in Prague, where he played an active part in the Association for Free Lectures on Mathematics - a student association and the predecessor of the Union of Czech Mathematicians and Physicists. From 1872 to 1874, while he was still a student, he acted as an assistant to Karel Koristka. He submitted his habilitation thesis on practical geometry (geodesy) to the Technical University at Prague in 1876 and obtained the right to lecture. From 1875 to 1886 he taught at the Second German Realschule in Prague. He married Adalberta Willigh in 1878 and had a daughter Berta, born in 1879, a son Emanuel, a second son, Erich, and a second daughter, Elisabet, born in 1884. Berta later made a morganatic marriage with Archduke Ferdinand Karl of Austria, brother of Archduke Franz Ferdinand, whose assassination in Sarajevo led to the outbreak of World War I.

Czuber was appointed as an ordinary professor (equivalent to today's full professor) at the German Technical University in Brno in 1886. In the academic year 1890-91 he was a Rector of the university. After the end of the academic year 1890-91 he took up an appointment as an ordinary professor at the Technical University in Vienna. The position became vacant when Anton Winckler applied for retirement and, although Czuber was not the first choice to fill the chair, other people who were put forward such as Moriz Allé and then Emil Weyr were not interested in accepting it. Czuber was Rector in the academic year 1894-95 and continued to hold the position of professor at the Technical University of Vienna until 1921, when he finally retired.

Among the topics Czuber studied was probability theory and related areas, contributing in 1900 to the 'Enzyklopädie der mathematischen Wissenschaften'. In fact, he wrote the first papers with original results on the probability theory in the Czech region. A large part of his studies, however, was devoted to questions concerning actuarial mathematics. He wrote several books (in German) such as Theorie der Beobachtungsfehler (1891), Die Entwicklung der Wahrscheinlichkeitstheorie und ihre Anwendungen (1898), Die Wahrscheinlichkeitsrechnung und ihre Anwendungen auf Fehlerausgleichung, Statistik und Lebensversicherung (first edition 1903, second edition 1908, reprinted 1968), Die statistischen Forschungsmethoden (1921), Die philosophischen Grundlagen der Wahrscheinlichkeitsrechnung (1923), and Mathematische Bevölkerungstheorie (1923).

For several years he was an editor of Technische Blätter (1876 to 1886). He also wrote some textbooks, e.g., Lehrbuch über Differential- und Integralrechnung (1898) and Einführung in die höhere Mathematik (1909). He translated a textbook Calcul des probabilités, which had been written by Franz A Meyer. His own book book Wahrscheinlichkeiten und Mittelwerte(1884) was translated into French (translation published in 1902). As an author he was active up to the end of his life.

He was honoured many times: at the age of 48 he was a "court advisor" (a special title typical for Austro-Hungarian Empire). He also received an honorary degree from the Technical University in Munich in 1918.

== Personal life ==
His first wife was Johanna Liebleina (1834-1881). They had two children:

- Bertha Czuber (1879-1979), who was the morganatic wife of Archduke Ferdinand Karl of Austria, the younger brother of Archduke Franz Ferdinand of Austria, the heir to the Austrian throne until his death in Sarajevo in 1914.
- Erich Czuber (1881-1966)

After the death of his first wife, Emanuel married Adalberta Willigk (1859-1953). They had two children:

- Emanuel Czuber (b. 1888)
- Elisabeth Czuber (1884-1976); married Leopold Forst Schaller (b. 1881)
