= Archduke Ferdinand of Austria =

There have been several men titled Archduke Ferdinand of Austria, including:

- Ferdinand I, Archduke of Austria (1503–1564), who later ascended to the title of the Holy Roman Emperor
- Ferdinand II, Archduke of Inner Austria (1578–1637), who later ascended to the title of the Holy Roman Emperor
- Ferdinand III, Archduke of Inner Austria (1608–1657), who later ascended to the title of the Holy Roman Emperor
- Ferdinand IV, Archduke of Austria (1633–1654), who later ascended to the title of the King of the Romans, heir to the title of the Holy Roman Emperor
- Archduke Franz Ferdinand Karl Ludwig Joseph (1863–1914), better known as Franz Ferdinand, was Heir to the Austrian throne from 1896 until he was assassinated in 1914, sparking World War I

Others who have held the title:

- Ferdinand II, Archduke of Further Austria (1529–1595)
- Ferdinand, Prince of Asturias (1571–1578)
- Cardinal-Infante Ferdinand of Austria (1609/1610–1641)
- Archduke Ferdinand Karl Anton Joseph Johann Stanislaus of Austria-Este (1754–1806), fourth son and fourteenth child of Holy Roman Emperor Francis I and Maria Theresa, commander of an Austrian army in the War of the Third Coalition
- Archduke Ferdinand Joseph Johann Baptist (1769–1824), second son of Holy Roman Emperor Leopold II, became Grand Duke Ferdinand III of Tuscany
- Archduke Ferdinand Karl Joseph of Austria-Este (1781–1850), younger son of Archduke Ferdinand Karl Anton Joseph Johann Stanislaus.
- Archduke Ferdinand Karl Leopold Joseph Franz Marcelin (1793–1875), eldest son of Holy Roman Emperor Francis II, became Emperor Ferdinand I of Austria upon his father's death in 1835
- Archduke Ferdinand Karl Viktor of Austria-Este (1821–1849), younger son of Duke Francis IV of Modena
- Archduke Ferdinand Maximilian Joseph (1832–1867), second son of Archduke Franz Karl of Austria and brother of Emperor Franz Josef of Austria; became Emperor Maximilian I of Mexico in 1864
- Archduke Ferdinand Karl Ludwig Joseph Johann Maria (1868–1915), younger brother of Archduke Franz Ferdinand, abandoned his dynastic rights to marry Bertha Czuber in 1909
- Archduke Ferdinand (1918–2004), married to Countess Helene (1937–), only daughter of Carl Theodor, Count zu Toerring-Jettenbach and Princess Elizabeth of Greece and Denmark (a sister of Princess Marina, Duchess of Kent)
