= John Nelson Stockwell =

American astronomer and mathematician

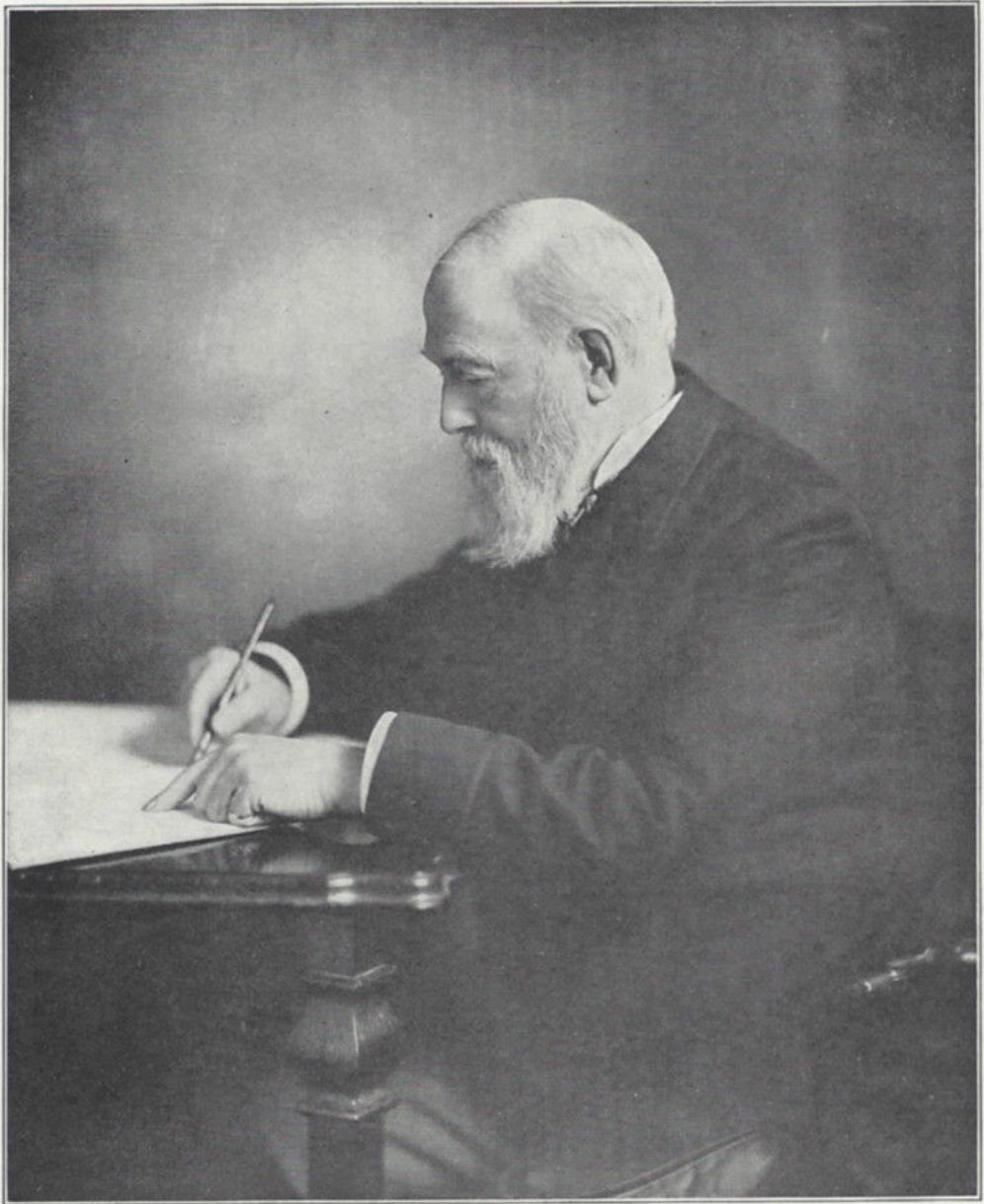
- Born: 10 April 1832; Northampton, Massachusetts, US
- Died: 18 May 1920 (aged 88); Shaker Heights, Ohio, US
- Resting place: Lake View Cemetery
- Occupations: Mathematician and Astronomer
- Spouse: Sarah Healy (m. 1855–1916)

John Nelson Robin Stockwell (10 April 1832 in Northampton, Massachusetts – 18 May 1920 in Shaker Heights, Ohio) was an American astronomer and mathematician.

== Life and work ==
John Nelson Stockwell grew up with an uncle and aunt on a farm in Brecksville, Ohio. He showed early mathematical talent and became interested in astronomy at the age of 12, when he experienced his first lunar eclipse. Largely self-taught, he acquired outstanding mathematical knowledge and skill. From 1854 he worked as a human computer for the United States Coast and Geodetic Survey under Benjamin Apthorp Gould, with whom he had been friends for decades. In 1861 he was appointed to a similar position at the United States Naval Observatory in Washington, D.C. In 1876 Stockwell earned a Ph.D. at Western Reserve University in Cleveland, Ohio.

There Stockwell became friends with the philanthropist Leonard Case, from whose legacy the Case School of Applied Sciences was founded in 1880. Stockwell became Professor of Mathematics and Astronomy. Case School and Western Reserve University later became Case Western Reserve University. As early as 1887 Stockwell gave up his professorship and subsequently devoted himself exclusively to research.

Stockwell was credited with calculating the orbits of numerous celestial bodies and the ecliptic. For example, he calculated the orbit of the asteroid Virginia and the dates of more than a hundred historical lunar and solar eclipses. Stockwell developed theories about the mutual orbital influence of celestial bodies and the calculation of the tides. In 1875 he was elected a Fellow of the American Association for the Advancement of Science, and in 1889 he was elected an Associate Fellow of the American Academy of Arts and Sciences.

Stockwell married Sarah Healy (1833–1916) in 1855. The couple had six children, four of whom survived to adulthood. John Nelson Stockwell died on 18 May 1920 in Shaker Heights, Ohio. He was 88 years of age. He is buried in Lake View Cemetery in Cleveland.
