= Deutsche Technische Hochschule Brünn =

Coordinates: 49.1966°N 16.6027°E

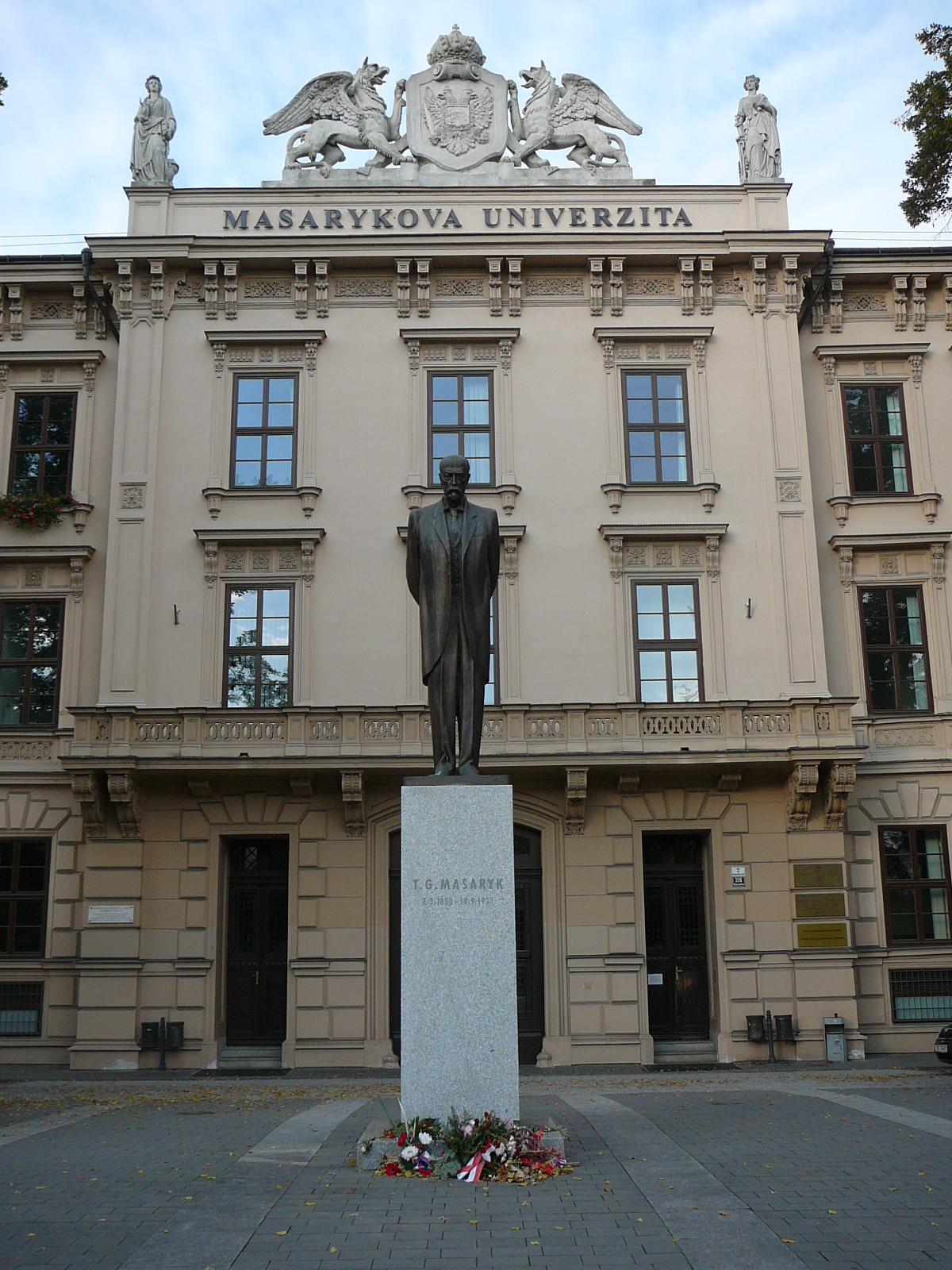
A building of Deutsche Technische Hochschule Brünn from 1860 (now Masaryk University)

The Deutsche Technische Hochschule Brünn was an institute of technology in Brno (German: Brünn). It existed from 1849 to 1945 and instruction was in German.

At the time, Brno was a multicultural city with both Czech and German populations. A technical university serving both nationalities was proposed, but fell through, resulting in the establishment of the Brno University of Technology in 1899. From 1860, the Deutsche Technische Hochschule was located on Komenského Square in Brno, and in 1910 a second building was built beside the first one.

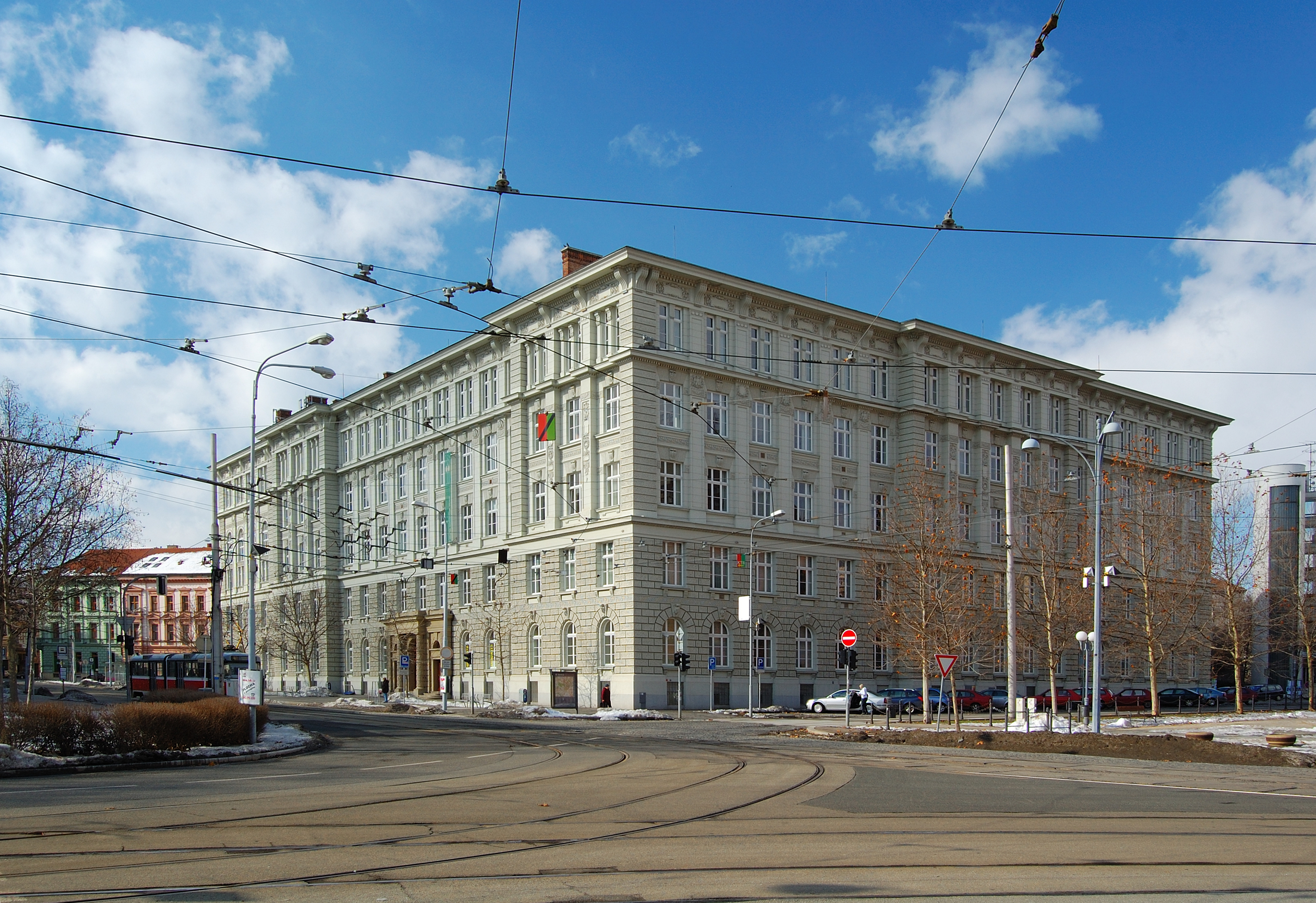
The second building was built up and added in 1910

During the Nazi occupation, it was planned for the university to be relocated to Linz, but this did not happen. In 1945, the Deutsche Technische Hochschule Brünn was closed and its property transferred to the Brno University of Technology.

== Literature ==
- ŠIŠMA, Pavel. Učitelé na německé technice v Brně 1849-1945. Praha: Společnost pro dějiny věd a techniky, 2004. 205 s. Práce z dějin techniky a přírodních věd; sv. 2. ISBN 80-239-3279-9.
- ŠIŠMA, Pavel. Zur Geschichte der Deutschen Technischen Hochschule in Brünn: Professoren, Dozenten und Assistenten 1849 - 1945. Linz: Trauner, 2009. ix, 192 s. Schriftenreihe Geschichte der Naturwissenschaften und der Technik; Bd. 13. ISBN 978-3-85499-451-0.
